= Herimanana Razafimahefa =

Malagasy politician (born 1957)

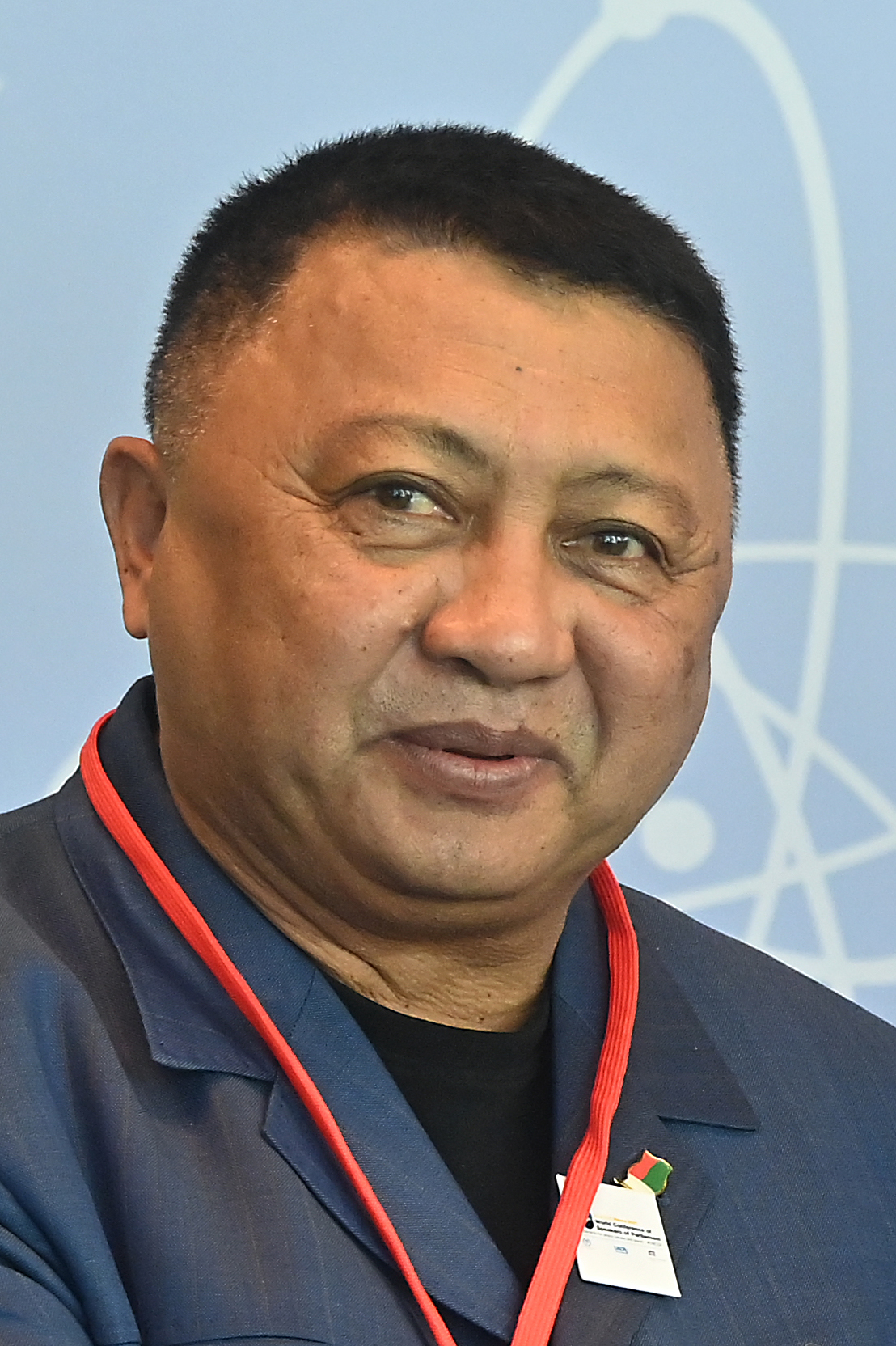
- Razafimahefa in 2021

President of the Senate of Madagascar
- In office 19 January 2021 – 12 October 2023
- President: Andry Rajoelina
- Preceded by: Rivo Rakotovao
- Succeeded by: Richard Ravalomanana

Secretary General, Ministry of National Education
- In office 2020 – 19 January 2021
- Prime Minister: Christian Ntsay

Personal details
- Born: 1957 (age 68–69)

Herimanana Razafimahefa (born 1957) is a Malagasy politician who served as President of the Senate of Madagascar from January 2021 to October 2023, succeeding Rivo Rakotovao. He was previously a senator representing Antananarivo, and ran unopposed for the president of the senate position.

In August 2020, following a reorganization of the Ministry of National Education, Technical and Vocational Education (MENETP), Razafimahefa was reappointed secretary general of the Ministry of National Education. While in the education ministry, he also made international news in April 2020 for supporting president Andry Rajoelina's recommendation to use a certain herbal drink to protect people from COVID-19.

Razafimahefa was described by the In Transformation Initiative newsletter as a "fierce Rajoelina loyalist".

Razafimahefa has worked as a minister of energy and mines.

On 10 October 2023, Razafimahefa said he was ready to exercise his duties as interim head of state. A position which is due to him during an electoral period according to the Constitution. On 12 October 2023, he was unanimously removed from his position as president of the Senate by a special session of the Senate.
