= Rivo Rakotovao =

Malagasy politician (born 1960)

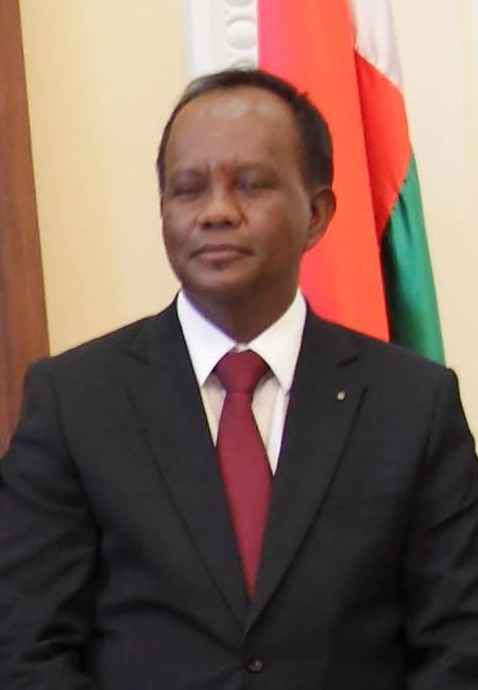
- Rakotovao in 2014

Acting President of Madagascar
- In office 7 September 2018 – 19 January 2019
- Prime Minister: Christian Ntsay
- Preceded by: Hery Rajaonarimampianina
- Succeeded by: Andry Rajoelina

President of the Senate of Madagascar
- In office 12 November 2017 – 19 January 2021
- President: Hery Rajaonarimampianina; Himself (acting); Andry Rajoelina
- Preceded by: Honoré Rakotomanana
- Succeeded by: Herimanana Razafimahefa

Personal details
- Born: 12 May 1960 (age 65) Madagascar
- Party: Hery Vaovao ho an'i Madagasikara

Rivo Rakotovao (born 12 May 1960) is a Malagasy politician who served as acting President of Madagascar from 2018 to 2019. Rakotovao also had served as President of the Senate of Madagascar from 2017 to 2021.

== Political career ==
On 7 September 2018, President Hery Rajaonarimampianina submitted his resignation from the presidency, an act required by law in order to participate in the upcoming presidential election. As a result, Rivotovao, the President of the Senate, assumed the role of acting president of Madagascar, a position he held until the inauguration of President-elect Andry Rajoelina. On 9 September, the United Nations Secretary-General, António Guterres, reaffirmed his support for Rivo Rakotovao.

On 14 June 2022, Rivo Rakotovao was summoned by the Independent Office for the Fight against Corruption, on suspicion of corruption, embezzlement of public funds and abuse of office.

He is the president of the New Strength for Madagascar party of former President Hery Rajaonarimampianina.

Political offices
Preceded by Hery Rajaonarimampianina	President of Madagascar; 2018–2019	Succeeded by Andry Rajoelina
