= List of presidents of the Senate of Madagascar =

This is a listing of the people who have taken the office of President of the Senate of Madagascar, also known as Speaker of the Senate. The President of the Senate is the legal successor to President of the Republic in the event of a vacancy in the latter position.

Name	Took office	Left office	Notes
Gabriel Rajaonson	1 July 1959	1 October 1960	
Jules Ravony	October 1960	1963	
Siméon Japhet	1963	1968	
No Senate	1968	2001	
Honoré Rakotomanana	May 2001	July 2002	
Guy Rajemison Rakotomaharo	July 2002	May 2008	
Yvan Randriasandratriniony	May 2008	April 2009	
No legislature	April 2009	October 2010	
General Rasolosoa Dolin	October 2010	18 February 2014	President of the Transitional upper house
No Senate	18 February 2014	9 February 2016	
Honoré Rakotomanana	9 February 2016	12 November 2017	
Rivo Rakotovao	12 November 2017	19 January 2021	
Herimanana Razafimahefa	19 January 2021	12 October 2023	
Richard Ravalomanana	12 October 2023	13 October 2025	
Jean André Ndremanjary	13 October 2025	14 October 2025	acting
Vacant (14 October 2025 – present)

== See also ==
- Senate (Madagascar)
