= Lantoniaina Rabenatoandro =

Malagasy politician

Member of the Senate of Madagascar
- Constituency: Vakinankaratra

Personal details
- Born: June 15, 1960 (age 65) Antananarivo, Madagascar
- Party: Tiako I Madagasikara

Lantoniaina Rabenatoandro (born June 15, 1960, in Antananarivo) is a Malagasy politician. He is a member of the Senate of Madagascar for Vakinankaratra, and is a member of the Tiako I Madagasikara party.
