= Ivor Chipkin =

South African public administration researcher

- Born: October 8, 1970; Johannesburg, Gauteng, South Africa
- Education: University of the Witwatersrand (BA, MA); École normale supérieure Paris-Saclay (MA, PhD)
- Spouse: Jelena Vidojević
- Scientific career
- Fields: Public administration Public policy
- Workplaces: Wits Institute for Social and Economic Research (WISER); Public Affairs Research Institute (PARI); New South Institute (NSI) (ex-GAPP)
- Thesis: Le sublime objet du nationalisme : le nationalisme et la démocratie en Afrique du Sud (2004)

Ivor Chipkin (born 8 October 1970) is a South African academic studying democracy and public management in the post-apartheid context.

His academic research has included analysis of corruption in South Africa. He co-authored the May 2017 publication Betrayal of the Promise: How South Africa is being stolen, and Shadow State: The Politics of State Capture (2018) which were among the first works to detail a corrupt state capture scheme orchestrated by members of the African National Congress (ANC).

In 2010, Chipkin established the Public Affairs Research Institute (PARI), where he served until 2018. In 2019, Chipkin inaugurated the think tank Government and Public Policy (GAPP), renamed the New South Institute (NSI) in 2023.

== Early life and education ==
Chipkin was a conscientious objector in the 1980s, refusing to serve in the apartheid defense forces. He became involved in the anti-apartheid movement in South Africa in his 20s when he joined the United Democratic Front (UDF). He worked as a researcher and activist with PlanAct in the early 1990s, supporting civil society organizations in their fight against apartheid. Chipkin completed his master's with distinction at the University of Witwatersrand (Wits) in Johannesburg. He then obtained a Diplôme d'Etudes Approfondies and a PhD, both with distinction, from the École normale supérieure Paris-Saclay. After his PhD, Chipkin was associated with the Wits Institute for Social and Economic Research (WISER) from 2001 to 2004. In 2005, he received an Oppenheimer fellowship and took up a position at St Anthony's College, University of Oxford.

== Career and academic contribution ==
Chipkin researched the transition from apartheid to democracy, the impact of political ideologies on national identity, and governance and corruption mechanisms in post-apartheid South Africa. He has worked on issues such as debates over race and class in South African historiography and the conceptualization of political community in national movements. Building on his PhD thesis, his analysis in Do South Africans Exist? (2007) addresses the tension between non-racialism and nationalism within the African National Congress and related groups.

In 2010, Chipkin founded the Public Affairs Research Institute (PARI), a research institute affiliated with the University of Johannesburg and the University of Witwatersrand. PARI focuses on studying government performance through an institutional lens, emphasizing the cultural, political, and social dimensions of public organizations. He resigned as executive director of PARI in September 2018.

A significant portion of Chipkin's research has been dedicated to the study of corruption and state capture. With Mark Swilling and others, he co-authored a May 2017 PARI report on state capture Betrayal of the Promise: How South Africa is being stolen, that analyzed the phenomenon within the country's political economy. It was described as "an extraordinary collaboration of academics and experts, conducted in near-secrecy and aimed at providing a comprehensive picture of the situation ... two months after the firing of Gordhan [South African government minister Pravin Gordhan], alongside his deputy, Mcebisi Jonas". Betrayal of the Promise and other works, such as Shadow State: The Politics of State Capture (2018, co-authored with Swilling), contributed to academic and public discourse on corruption and governance; Gordhan repeatedly mentioned Betrayal of the Promise in his 2018 testimony to the Zondo Commission.

Shadow State has been recognized for its meticulous evidence and analysis of corruption scandals, notably involving President Jacob Zuma and the Gupta family, which have significantly influenced South African democracy and governance. In Foreign Affairs, reviewer Nicolas van de Walle highlighted the book's detailed documentation of influence peddling, rent seeking, insider trading, and corruption, underscoring its contribution to exposing and understanding the depth of state capture in South Africa. Shadow State also raised an important debate about the role of academics as active participants in a political moment, said How to Steal a City author Crispian Olver in a South African Historical Journal review. "Until the release of Betrayal of the Promise, the academic community had been largely silent on the state capture process that was unfolding," Olver said. Emile Coetzee recalled a famous remark about corruption: "If Sir John Dalberg-Acton's famous phrase "Power corrupts but absolute power corrupts absolutely" is true then this book by Ivor Chipkin and Mark Swilling will most certainly be of great importance in any historical case of State capturing against the Zuma administration."

After this period, Chipkin also began working with data scientists to develop algorithms to predict organizational risks, including corruption, by combining social science methods with data analysis.

In addition to his academic output, Chipkin is active in South African public dialogue, contributing regular columns to newspapers Daily Maverick and Mail & Guardian, and specialized public administration portals like Global Government Forum. Chipkin's contributions have reached international visibility with publications such as The New York Times, interviews in outlets such as Folha de S.Paulo, and through participation on the boards of international organizations focused on the study of phenomena such as state capture, such as the Belgrade Centre for Security Policy in Serbia.

In 2019, Chipkin was a co-founder of a new think tank, initially named Government and Public Policy (GAPP), which was later renamed the New South Institute (NSI). The think tank aims to address contemporary challenges in governance and public management using diverse methodologies, including corruption measurement techniques that have been recognized by international bodies including the International Anti-Corruption Academy.

In 2022, he co-authored a report, Dangerous elites: protest, conflict and the future of South Africa, published by the Institute for Security Studies.

== Selected publications ==
- Do South Africans Exist? (Wits University Press, 2007)
- Betrayal of the Promise: How South Africa is being stolen (PARI, 2017)
- Shadow State: The Politics of State Capture (Wits University Press, 2018)
