= Jean Parfait Laurent Mafilaza =

Malagasy politician (born 1947)

Jean Parfait Laurent Mafilaza (born 12 July 1947 in Nosy-Be) is a Malagasy politician. He is a member of the Senate of Madagascar for Diana Region, and is a member of the party.
