= Edouard Robert =

Malagasy politician (born 1937)

Edouard Robert (born June 24, 1937, in Midongy) is a Malagasy politician. He is a member of the Senate of Madagascar for Analamanga, and is a member of the Tiako I Madagasikara party.
