= Rajemison Rakotomaharo =

Malagasy politician

Guy Rajemison Rakotomaharo (born January 12, 1950) is a Malagasy politician who was appointed as vice-president of Madagascar in September 2009. Previously he was President of the Senate of Madagascar from 2002 to 2008 and Permanent Representative to the United Nations Office at Geneva beginning in 2008.

== Life and career ==
Rakotomaharo, a Merina, was born in Andilamena. From 1973 to 1990, he was an advisor to the Director-General of the Maritime Auxiliary of Madagascar (Auximad); subsequently, from 1990 to 1992 he was director of an Auximad agency and then administrative and financial director of a French company. He was Professor of Economics and Management at the University of Antananarivo, as well as at the Higher Institute of Business and Management Communication (ISCAM), from 1992 to 1996, and he held important positions at TIKO, Marc Ravalomanana's dairy company, from 1996 to 1999. Ravalomanana was elected as Mayor of Antananarivo in November 1999, and Rakotomaharo, who supported him, was elected as a municipal councillor from the Second Arrondissement of Antananarivo. Under Ravalomanana, he was appointed as Deputy Mayor of Antananarivo in February 2000.

In the December 2001 presidential election, Rakotomaharo was Ravalomanana's campaign director. After the election, Ravalomanana declared victory and took office as president under controversial circumstances, and Rakotomaharo served as Interim Mayor of Antananarivo in 2002. He was chosen as a member of the national political bureau of the Tiako i Madagasikara (TIM) ruling party in mid-2002. He was also appointed by Ravalomanana as a Senator, and on July 24, 2002, he was elected as President of the Senate.

In the April 2008 Senate election, Rakotomaharo was elected to another term in the Senate from Analamanga region; he received unanimous support from the 147 electors who voted, despite the presence of three other candidates. Yvan Randriasandratriniony was subsequently elected to succeed Rakotomaharo as President of the Senate on May 6, 2008. Rakotomaharo officially proposed Randriasandratriniony for the position, and he said that the decision that he would not serve a second term was an internal TIM matter. Rakotomaharo was instead elected as First Vice-president of the Senate. At a TIM congress later in May 2008, Rakotomaharo was not included in the party's political bureau.

Rakotomaharo was subsequently appointed as Permanent Representative to the United Nations Office at Geneva, and he was accordingly replaced as First Vice-president of the Senate by Noël Rakotondramboa on July 2, 2008. He was also replaced in his Senate seat. He departed Madagascar to take up his new post on July 12, 2008.

President Ravalomanana was forced out of office through popular protests and military intervention in March 2009; opposition leader Andry Rajoelina assumed the presidency with support from the military. On March 23, 2009, Rajoelina's High Authority of the Transition revoked the appointment of various ambassadors, but it notably left Rakotomaharo in his post. Rakotomaharo was subsequently present at the national conference which began on April 2, 2009, and was promoted by Rajoelina's government; he was invited to attend by the High Authority of the Transition due to his status as a former President of the Senate, and he said that he was representing only himself. His presence, indicating disloyalty to his party, was perceived as a setback to the TIM.

Rajoelina appointed Rakotomaharo as vice-president on 8 September 2009; he also appointed a new government on the same date. He ostensibly did so in the spirit of the Maputo agreement between Malagasy political leaders, which called for the creation of a national unity government, but the opposition denounced Rajoelina's appointments, and Rakotomaharo was considered to have completely broken with Ravalomanana.

Rakotomaharo is a member of the Church of Jesus Christ in Madagascar.
