= Berthin Telolahy =

Malagasy politician

Berthin Telolahy (born November 15, 1958, in Antananarivo) is a Malagasy politician. He is a member of the Senate of Madagascar for Ihorombe, and is a member of the Tiako I Madagasikara party.
