= René Razafiarison =

Malagasy politician

René Razafiarison (born 25 July 1937 in Antananarivo) is a Malagasy politician. He is a member of the Senate of Madagascar for Analamanga, and he is a member of the Parliamentary Alliance for the Development of Madagascar.
