= Jacky Mahafaly Tsiandopy =

Malagasy politician

Jacky Mahafaly Tsiandopy (May 13, 1952 – July 31, 2017) is a Malagasy politician. He is a member of the Senate of Madagascar for Sava Region, and is a member of the Tiako I Madagasikara party.
