= Julien Razafimanazato =

Malagasy teacher

Minister of Education
- In office Martsa 2009 – March 2011

Personal details
- Born: 7 July 1968 (age 56); Mandritsara, French Madagascar
- Political party: ESD

Julien Razafimanazato (born July 7, 1968, in Mandritsara, Madagascar) is a former minister of education, from 2009 to 2011. His occupation is teaching in higher education and the CEO IMGAM.

== Biography ==
Razafimanazato is married with 3 children, and is of Tsimihety ethnicity.

=== Academic career ===
==== Studies ====
He grew up and attended high school at Lycée Victor Miadana, Mandritsara, to baccalaureate level. He continued his studies at the universities of Fianarantsoa and Antananarivo during which he obtained his graduate degree in pure mathematics. Upon completion of his academic training, he had earned more than five high-level qualifications, elevating him into the world of the Madagascar and even the French elite:

- In 1990–1991, license in mathematical sciences at the University of Fianarantsoa.
- Double math master's degree: pure mathematics and applied mathematics at the University of Antananarivo.
- AEA (Certificate of Advanced Studies) – pure mathematics in 1994 at the University of Antananarivo.
- In 1996, DEA pure mathematics – option: harmonic analysis at the University of Antananarivo.
- School of Engineering Mathematics, statistics option. He continued his graduate studies in succession at the University Paris VII, and the Pantheon-Sorbonne University and Paris XI.

==== Careers ====
Razafimanazato is a professor of applied mathematics at the Ampasampito (IST) and teacher mathematician statistician engineer MEN / MINESUP from 1997 to 2000.

== Political career ==
=== Minister ===
Moderator of the anti-Ravalomanana movement in France with the association for the interest and the defense of national unity of Madagascar (Madagascar ASSIDU) since 2002, Julien Razafimanazato, immigrated to France, returns to the country to participate in the 2009 putsch led by the president of the Transition Andry Rajoelina. He took part in the conquest of the departments on the Place du 13 May and is rewarded for his actions by the position of the Minister of Sports of the first government of Monja Roindefo. He was then appointed Minister of Education, a post he held until 2011. It must give way in the government during the establishment of the first government of Albert Camille Vital, but it does not matter abandoning his political career. The Minister of Education Razafimanazato Julien, was invited by the Unesco, as part of the 35th session of the General Conference of this specialized agency of the United Nations to 23 October 2009. On that occasion, the minister made on behalf of the Republic of Madagascar.

=== Political party ===
He founded the Association Eto Sehatry ny Daholobe (ESD) Solidarity Space for Development in English. The latter is gradually sided with the opposition and turns into political party to present its founding president in the presidential election.

=== 2013 Malagasy general election ===
Razafimanazato was also one out off 33 candidates for the presidential election in Madagascar 2013 but he only obtained 1.61% of votes.
