= Raymond Ramandimbilahatra =

Malagasy politician

Raymond Ramandimbilahatra is a Malagasy politician. He is a member of the Senate of Madagascar for Analamanga, and is a member of the Tiako i Madagasikara party.
