= Charlie Rakotoariventiny =

Malagasy politician (born 1954)

Charlie Rakotoariventiny (born c. 1954) is a Malagasy politician. He is a member of the Senate of Madagascar for Itasy, and is a member of the Tiako i Madagasikara party.
