= Emiline Rakotobe =

Malagasy politician

Emiline Rakotobe is a Malagasy politician. She is a former member of the Senate of Madagascar for Alaotra Mangoro, and is a member of the Tiako I Madagasikara party.
