= State capture =

Corruption where private interests influence a state's decision-making processes

State capture is a type of systemic political corruption in which private interests significantly influence a state's decision-making processes to their own advantage.

The term was first used by the World Bank in 2000 to describe certain Central Asian countries making the transition from Soviet communism, where small corrupt groups used their influence over government officials to appropriate government decision-making in order to strengthen their own economic positions.

Allegations of state capture have led to protests against the government in Bulgaria in 2013–2014 and in 2020–2021 and Romania in 2017, and have caused an ongoing controversy in South Africa beginning in 2016. Turkey is considered as a post-2002 example of state capture. The term has also been used against Elon Musk by critics of U.S. President Donald Trump.

== Definition ==
The original definition of state capture refers to the way formal procedures (such as laws and social norms) and government bureaucracy are manipulated by government officials, state-backed companies, private companies or private individuals, so as to influence state policies and laws in their favour.

State capture seeks to influence the formation of laws, in order to protect and promote influential actors and their interests. In this way it differs from most other forms of corruption which instead seek selective enforcement of already existing laws.

State capture is not necessarily illegal, depending on determination by the captured state itself, and may be attempted through private lobbying and influence. The influence may be through a range of state institutions, including the legislature, executive, ministries, and the judiciary, or through a corrupt electoral process. It is similar to regulatory capture but differs in the scale and variety of influenced areas and, unlike regulatory capture, the private influence is never overt.

A distinguishing factor from corruption is that, though in cases of corruption the outcome (of policy or regulatory decision) is not certain, in cases of state capture the outcome is known and is highly likely to be beneficial to the captors of the state. In 2017, a group of South African academics further developed the concept in a report on state capture in South Africa, titled "Betrayal of the Promise Report". The analysis emphasised the political character of state capture, arguing that in South Africa a power elite violated the Constitution and broke the law in the service of a political project, which they believed unachievable in the existing constitutional/legal framework.

A 2023 academic paper argued that "the concept of state capture helps to structure our understanding of patterns of grand corruption seen around the world in varied contexts, and increasingly even in countries once regarded as secure democracies."

== Examples by region or country ==
=== Africa ===
The Ghana Centre for Democratic Development (CDD Ghana) in 2025 issued a new Democracy Capture Index (DEMCAP) indicates concern that powerful interests are increasingly taking control of democratic institutions, undermining legitimate state governance, particularly in nations transitioning from authoritarianism to liberal democracy.

=== Bulgaria ===
Protests in Bulgaria in 2013–14 against the Oresharski cabinet were prompted by allegations that it came to power due to the actions of an oligarchic structure (formerly allied to Boyko Borisov) which used underhand maneuvers to discredit the GERB party.

Conversely, in 2020 large anti-GERB protests broke out, accusing Borisov and his party of once again allying themselves with oligarchic organizations, permitting corruption and undermining political opposition. Press freedom in Bulgaria diminished to the point it was rated worst in the EU; one oligarch, Delyan Peevski, controls close to 80% of the newspaper distribution market.

Bulgaria's exposure to oligarchic networks has had a negative impact, most significantly in the area of energy policy. The close proximity between Bulgarian and Russian elites is largely underpinned by Russia's significant economic presence in Bulgaria, with Gazprom being Bulgaria's sole natural gas provider and Rosatom having a dominant position in the country's nuclear sector. As Russia has increased influence over Bulgaria's economy, it has used dominant positions in strategic sectors to strengthen relationships and cultivate new ones with corrupt businessmen and local oligarchs. This has allowed for access to prominent politicians, over which they are able to exert considerable control.

=== Latin America ===
Instances where politics have been ostensibly deformed by the power of drug barons in Colombia and Mexico are also considered as examples of state capture. Both Argentina and Bolivia have been the subject of Russian strategic corruption efforts by its usage of corrosive capital. While the Kremlin has used similar strategies in Argentina and Bolivia, it has adopted strategies that suit local conditions.

In Argentina, political decision-making is more dispersed, while transfers of power are more frequent, making large-scale, long-term projects more difficult to implement. Therefore, in Argentina, Putin has used trade as a bargaining chip. In 2015 Argentina suspended the television license for RT, to which the Kremlin retaliated by threatening to ban Argentine beef exports and suspend investment projects; several weeks later, RT was officially allowed to continue operating.

In Bolivia, power is concentrated, allowing Russian state-owned companies deeper traction, pushing through projects with no significant resistance. Therefore, the Kremlin strategy in Bolivia has been to maximise influence by focusing on strategic markets and long-term infrastructure deals.

=== Western Balkans ===
As of 2020, state capture in the Western Balkans was undermining the EU enlargement process, strengthening ruling parties and weakening independent institutions and political opposition.

For instance, in 2020, through clientelist networks and loyalty-based appointments, the ruling party of Serbia, the Serbian Progressive Party, had effectively captured the state, resulting in the country losing its status as a "free" country according to the Freedom House Freedom in the World index.

=== Middle East ===
The influence that Hezbollah in Lebanon and pro-Iran militias in Iraq exert over their respective governments has often been characterized as a form of state capture.

=== South Africa ===
In May 2017, a group of academics convened by Mark Swilling and including Ivor Chipkin, Lumkile Mondi, Haroon Bhorat and others, published the Betrayal of the Promise report, the first major study of state capture in South Africa. It helped galvanise civil-society opposition to the unconstitutional developments in South African civil-society responses. The analysis was further developed in the book Shadow State: The Politics of State Capture written by Chipkin and Swilling.

The 2017 book How to Steal a City details state capture within the Nelson Mandela Bay Metropolitan Municipality in South Africa during the Zuma government.

==== Gupta family ====
The pattern [of state capture] is a simple one. "You remove management, and put in compliant management. You remove boards, and put in boards that are compliant. The rest is very easy. That has been the scenario at state-owned enterprises.

– Mcebisi Jonas, former Deputy Finance Minister; explaining the process of state capture.

In 2016, there were allegations of an overly close and potentially corrupt relationship between the wealthy Gupta family and the South African president Jacob Zuma, his family and leading members of the African National Congress (ANC).

South African opposition parties have made claims of "state capture" following allegations that the Guptas had inserted themselves into a position where they could offer Cabinet positions and influence the running of government. These allegations were made in light of revelations by former ANC MP Vytjie Mentor and Deputy Finance Minister Mcebisi Jonas that they had been offered Cabinet positions by the Guptas at the family's home in Saxonwold, a suburb in Johannesburg.

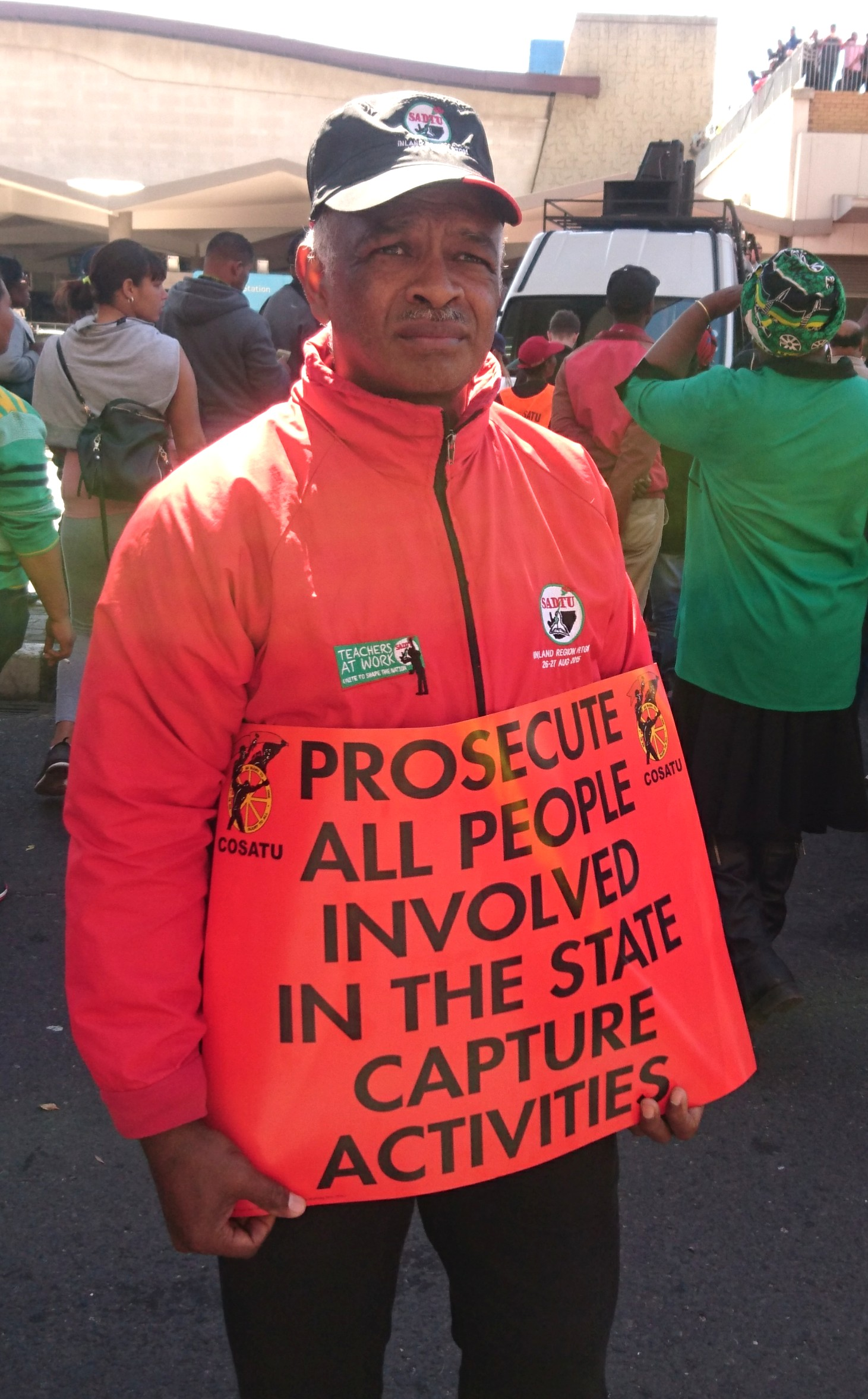
A COSATU protester in Cape Town holding a protest placard calling for the prosecution of "all people involved in the state capture activities." The protest was against government corruption and state capture in the administration of South African President Jacob Zuma.

Mentor claimed that, in 2010, the Guptas had offered her the position of Minister of Public Enterprises, provided that she arranged for South African Airways to drop their India route, allowing a Gupta-linked company (Jet Airways) to take on the route. She said that she declined the offer, which occurred at the Guptas' Saxonwold residence, while President Zuma was in another room. This came a few days before a cabinet reshuffle in which minister Barbara Hogan (then Minister of Public Enterprises) was dismissed by Zuma. The Gupta family denied that the meeting took place and also denied offering Vytjie Mentor a ministerial position, while President Zuma claimed that he had no recollection of Mentor.

Deputy Finance Minister Jonas said that he had been offered a ministerial position by the Guptas shortly before the dismissal of Finance Minister Nhlanhla Nene in December 2015, but had rejected the offer as "it makes a mockery of our hard-earned democracy‚ the trust of our people and no one apart from the President of the Republic appoints ministers." The Gupta family denied offering Jonas the job of Finance Minister. In 2016, Paul O'Sullivan's 'Forensics for Justice' published a report, which alleged that South Africa's criminal justice system had been "captured" by the underworld.

Following a formal complaint submitted in March 2016 by a catholic priest, Father Stanslaus Muyebe, the Guptas' alleged "state capture" was investigated by Public Protector Thuli Madonsela. President Zuma and Minister Des van Rooyen applied for a court order to prevent the publication of the report on 14 October 2016, Madonsela's last day in office. Van Rooyen's application was dismissed, and the President withdrew his application, leading to the release of the report on 2 November 2016. On 25 November 2016, Zuma announced that the Presidency would be reviewing the contents of the state capture report. He said it "was done in a funny way" with "no fairness at all," and argued he was not given enough time to respond to the public protector.

Zuma and Van Rooyen denied any wrongdoing whilst the Guptas disputed evidence in the report and also denied being involved in corrupt activities. In an exclusive interview with ANN7 (belonging to the Gupta Family), President Zuma said that 'state capture' was a fancy word used by media houses for propaganda proliferation. He said that a real state capture would include seizure of the three arms of the constitution—Legislative, Executive, and Judiciary—which has never been the case in South Africa.

The report recommended establishment of a judicial commission of inquiry into the issues identified, including a full probe of Zuma's dealings with the Guptas, with findings to be published within 180 days. In May 2017, Jacob Zuma denied the allegation of blocking an attempt to set up a commission of inquiry to probe state capture. The report led to the establishment of the Zondo Commission of Inquiry in 2018, set up to investigate allegations of state capture in South Africa.

==== Economic impact ====
On 11 September 2017, former Finance Minister Pravin Gordhan estimated the cost of state capture at 250 billion rand (almost $17 billion USD), in a presentation at the University of Cape Town Graduate School of Business. The Daily Maverick, a South African news publication, estimated that state capture cost the country roughly R1.5 trillion (roughly US$100 billion) in the four years preceding 2019. South African Reserve Bank economist David Fowkes stated that the negative impact of state capture on the country's economy was worse than expected, stating that it likely reduced GDP growth by an estimated 4% a year.

==== Russian involvement in SA state capture ====
Allegations of state capture were also known to have increased as the relationship between South Africa and Russia grew, resulting in a partnership that increasingly impacted upon the decision-making process of the African state. Soon after President Zuma took office, Moscow attempted to make inroads into Africa, all the while capitalizing on a South African leader who had extensive Soviet Bloc connections. The transactional nature of the relationship began when Zuma pushed to be included in the BRIC grouping during the 2008 financial crisis, receiving important backing from the Kremlin which ultimately led to Zuma attending his first BRICS meeting in 2011. The Kremlin also worked to establish ties between the two states’ security services, with some suggesting that Zuma had sought to implement state surveillance capabilities with Russia's help. Finally, amid countrywide debate surrounding the future electrical need of South Africa, a joint press statement with the Russian state nuclear cooperation, Rosatom, announced an agreement to provide up to 8 nuclear reactors. In 2017, that agreement was struck down in court as unconstitutional.

=== Iranian ===
Since 2026 Iran war various reports have called out IRGC for amassing power.

=== Madagascar ===
In Madagascar, Mamy Ravatomanga—a businessman and close advisor of former President Andry Rajoelina—is accused of monopolizing certain sectors of the Malagasy economy, exerting significant influence over administrative appointments and decisions, harnessing public institutions to serve his own interests, and enjoying judicial impunity.

=== Kenya ===
In May 2019, reports of state capture in Kenya started emerging. Inside Kenya's Inability to Fight Corruption, which was published by Africa Centre for Open Governance (AfriCOG) highlighted the issue, outlining why President Uhuru Kenyatta's anti-corruption measures were not working. This was attributed to state capture where state institutions had been repurposed for private profiteering mainly by the first family. The study concluded that public-driven prosecutions, rampant in Kenya, were likely to worsen corruption rather than reduce it.

In June 2022, UDA presidential candidate William Ruto (now the current president) stated that he would end state capture in Kenya if he took office after the August 2022 General Elections. He claimed he would form a quasi-judicial public inquiry within 30 days to establish the extent of cronyism and state capture in the nation and make recommendations.

=== United States ===
State capture in the United States during the Second Gilded Age has gained increased attention during the second Trump presidency.

== See also ==
- Crony capitalism
- Democratic backsliding
- Entryism
- Narco-state
- Regulatory capture
- 2023 Israeli judicial reform protests: government accused of attempted state capture by judicial coup
