= Noël Rakotondramboa =

Malagasy politician

Noël Rakotondramboa is a Malagasy politician. A member of the Tiako i Madagasikara party, he was the First Vice-President of the Senate of Madagascar from 2008 to 2009.
