= Covid-Organics =

Artemisia-based drink claimed to prevent COVID-19

Alternative medicine
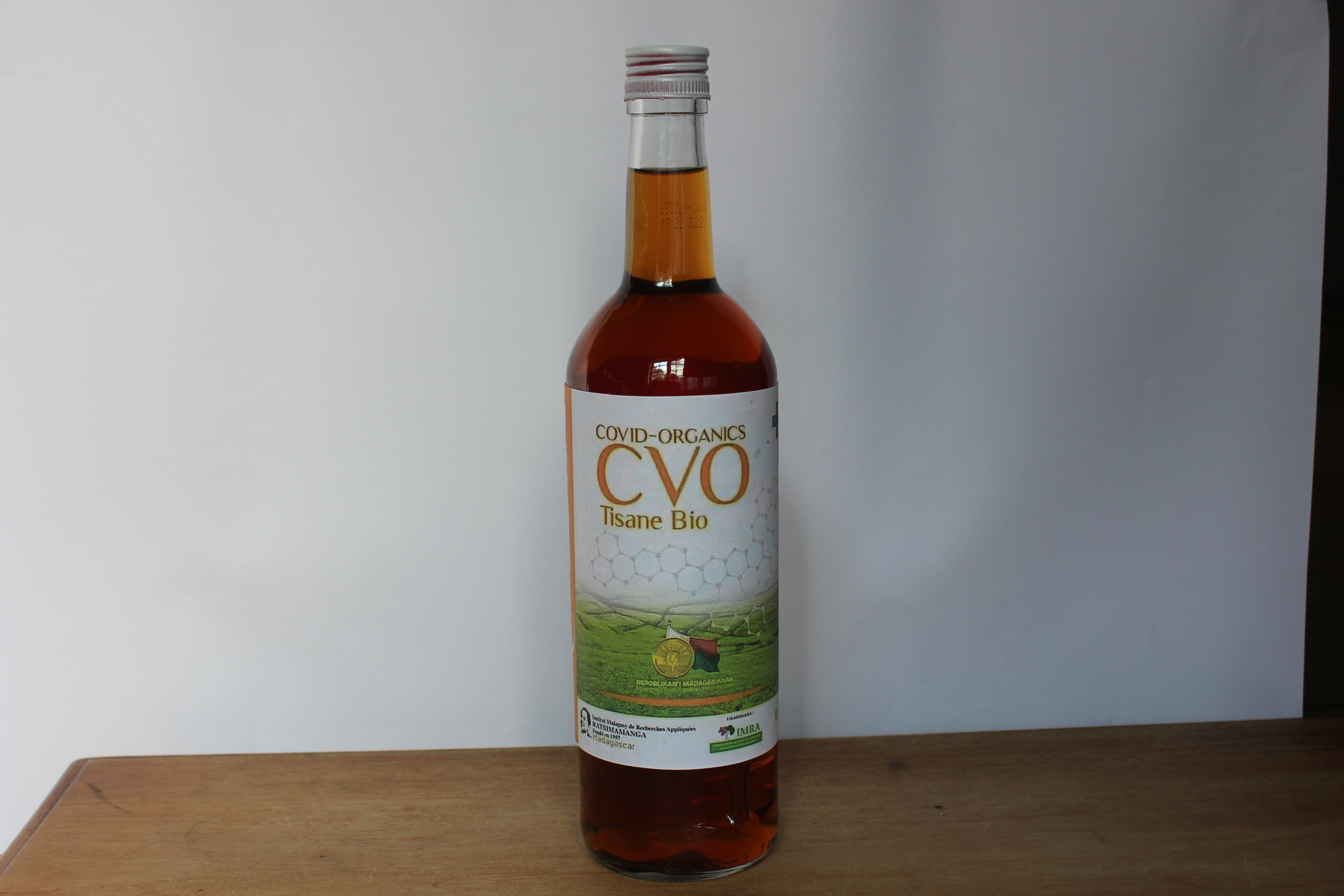
- A bottle of Covid Organics
- Claims: Treatment against COVID-19
- Year proposed: 2020
- Original proponents: Malagasy Institute of Applied Research

Covid-Organics (CVO) is an Artemisia-based drink that Andry Rajoelina, former president of Madagascar, claims can prevent and cure Coronavirus disease 2019 (COVID-19). The drink is produced from a species under the Artemisia genus from which artemisinin is extracted for malaria treatment. No publicly available clinical trial data supports the safety or efficacy of this drink.

Covid-Organics was developed and produced in Madagascar by the Malagasy Institute of Applied Research. Madagascar was the first country to decide to integrate Artemisia into COVID-19 treatment when the NGO Maison de l'Artemisia France contacted numerous African countries during the COVID-19 pandemic. At least one researcher from another part of Africa, Dr. Jérôme Munyangi of the Democratic Republic of the Congo, contributed. Some of the research on Artemisia, led by African scientists, had been carried out in France and Canada. On 20 April 2020, Rajoelina announced in a television broadcast that his country had found "preventive and curative" cure for COVID-19. Rajoelina publicly sipped from a bottle of Covid-Organics and ordered a nation-wide distribution to families. In 2022, Covid-Organics is not recommended by the WHO.

== World Health Organization ==
On 20 May 2020, Rajoelina announced on his Twitter account that the World Health Organization (WHO) will sign a confidentiality agreement with Madagascar regarding the formulation of CVO in order to perform clinical observation. On 21 May 2020, WHO director general Tedros Adhanom confirmed his video conference with Rajoelina, and that the WHO will cooperate with Madagascar on research and development of COVID-19 therapy. The WHO does not recommend the use of non-pharmaceutical Artemisia plant matter. The official position of WHO is that it "supports scientifically-proven traditional medicine" and "recognizes that traditional, complementary and alternative medicine has many advantages".

== Controversy ==
A wide range of scientific criticism followed the launch of Covid-Organics from within and outside Africa. Before cooperating with Madagascar, the World Health Organization (WHO) issued a warning against use of an untested COVID-19 remedy and said Africans deserve medicine that went through proper scientific trials. At the time, Covid-Organics efficacy and safety was tested on fewer than 20 people within a period of three weeks. In order to meet established scientific standards, the two parties later agreed on a partnership for Covid-Organics to be registered for WHO's Solidarity trials, an international program for fast tracking clinical trials on COVID-19 treatment candidates. The African Union (AU) demanded detailed scientific data on Covid-Organics for analysis by Africa CDC after it had been briefed by Madagascar authorities about the herbal remedy. Africa Centres for Disease Control and Prevention expressed its interest in data for Covid-Organics for the purpose of quickly scaling up an effective and safe remedy. In April, the Economic Community of West African States (ECOWAS) denied ordering a package of CVO after media reports that it had ordered for CVO and said the West Africa Health Organization (WAHO) would only endorse products shown to be effective and safe for use through well-known scientific procedure. As concerns about the safety of CVO grow, South Africa offered to help Madagascar conduct a clinical trial on the herbal tonic.

There are concerns over widespread usage of Artemisia accelerating drug resistance toward ACTs for malaria treatment.

== Patronage ==
More than 19 African and Caribbean countries have taken delivery of CVO as of May 2020 to combat COVID-19. On 20 May, Ghanaian government finally placed an order for CVO for testing after weeks of pressure from Ghanaians that the herbal remedy be used to halt the spread of Coronavirus. At the end of April, Equatorial Guinea, among the first to express support for the remedy, sent a special envoy to Madagascar for a donated shipment of CVO. Madagascar sent quantities of the product to at least 10 African countries in 2020.

== Covid-organics Plus ==
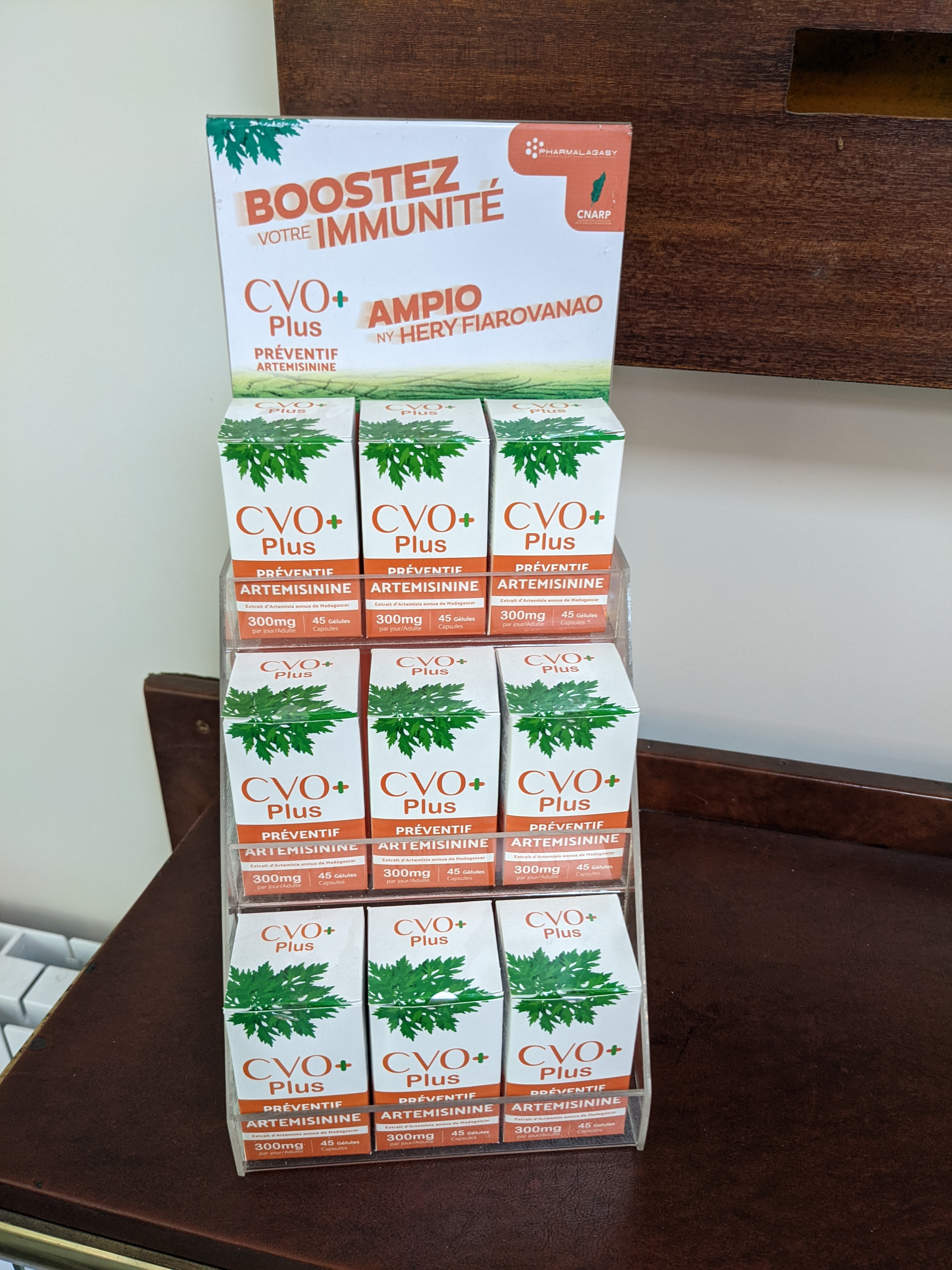
Covid-Organics CVO+

On 2 October 2020, President Andry Rajoelina inaugurated a medical factory named "Pharmalagasy" and officially started to produce CVO pills named "CVO-plus".

On 5 July 2021, WHO issued a statement announcing the completion of phase 3 clinical trials of the CVO+ dry capsule at the National Center for the Application of Pharmaceutical Research (CNARP) of Madagascar, indicating that the results will be reviewed by the Regional Expert Advisory Committee formed in partnership with Africa CDC. The committee will advise the manufacturer on the next steps to take.

== See also ==
- List of unproven methods against COVID-19
