= Mamy Ravatomanga =

Malagasy businessman

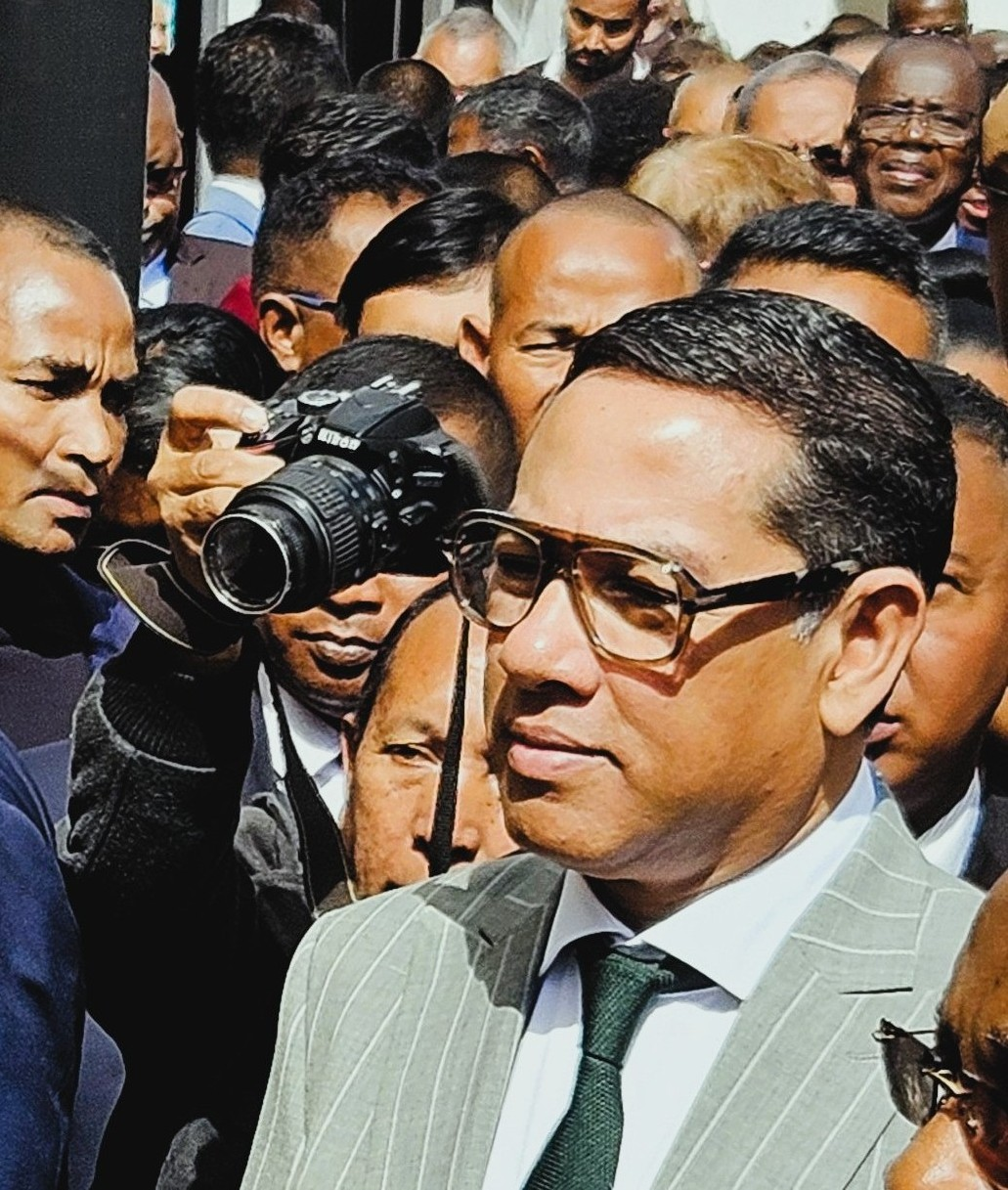
- Mamy Ravatomanga in 2024.
- Born: Maminiaina Ravatomanga; November 8, 1968 (age 57); Morondava, Madagascar
- Occupation: Businessman

Maminiaina Ravatomanga, often known as Mamy Ravatomanga (born in November 11, 1968, in Morondava), is a Malagasy businessman, owner of the Sodiat group, and close adviser to former President Andry Rajoelina. He is quoted by Forbes, in 2017, as the second richest man in Madagascar, behind Ylias Akbaraly.

Targeted during the 2025 social unrest for his grip on the Malagasy economy and his close ties to the ruling regime, he fled the country for Mauritius on 12 October 2025, when several military units mutinied and joined the protesters and shortly before Rajoelina himself left the country. He was arrested on 24 October for embezzlement and money laundering by Mauritian authorities.

== Biography ==
In 1990, he founded Sodiat, a company specializing in transport. It is now a conglomerate with activities in oil maintenance, construction, the press, hotels, tourism, health, and import-export and is one of the most important companies in Madagascar.

In 2009, he got closer to Andry Rajoelina during 2008, their two companies being subject to the tax authorities, whose investigations had been initiated by the entourage of the president at the time, Marc Ravalomanana. Subsequently, Ravatomanga supported Andry Rajoelina's accession to power through a coup d'état in March 2009, became his unofficial adviser on economic issues, and therefore remained close to him.

In July 2019, Ravatomanga was appointed Honorary Consul of Serbia. In August 2023, he was also appointed Honorary Consul of the Republic of Ivory Coast in Madagascar.

=== Philanthropy ===
He is also involved in numerous philanthropic and charitable projects, notably through the SODIAT foundation, created in 2020. Its scope of action covers education, health, sport, sustainable development and culture.

=== 2025 Malagasy demonstrations ===
Starting on September 25, 2025, a protest movement erupted in Madagascar, denouncing recurring water and electricity cuts. Violently repressed by law enforcement, the movement grew in strength, and its demands evolved toward the resignation of President Andry Rajoelina.

Businessman Mamy Ravatomanga was also criticized for his control over the Malagasy economy and politics, his close ties to President Rajoelina, and his involvement in the repression of the population through a private security company owned by his conglomerate. This company was portrayed by some as a militia employing Serbian mercenaries, and some called for an investigation against him.

In a televised address on October 6, 2025, he rejected all of these accusations, stating that all legal proceedings against him had been dropped.

==== Escape to Mauritius ====
On the weekend of October 11 and 12, 2025, troops from CAPSAT, a military unit in the capital, publicly announced their refusal to fire on the protesters and decided to join them. After skirmishes with loyalist forces, the unit declared it was taking control of the entire armed forces and appointed General Demosthenes Pikulas as its new chief of staff. President Rajoelina left the country.

On the night of October 12–13, 2025, he fled the country aboard a Cessna Citation belonging to his company, headed for Mauritius, accompanied by former Prime Minister Christian Ntsay, their respective wives, and Mamy Ravatomanga's children. The plane, with no landing slot or flight plan, was granted emergency landing authorization at Sir Seewoosagur Ramgoolam Airport around 1:00 a.m. after approximately 30 minutes of waiting in the air due to fuel shortages.

He is the subject of an investigation by the Mauritian Financial Crimes Commission into corruption against airport authorities and also into the nature of funds transferred to Mauritius from Madagascar. The Mauritius Revenue Authority is also opening investigations against him. On October 21, the Malagasy authorities issued an extradition request against him. The Mauritius financial crimes commission requested a court order to freeze US $180 million held by Ravatomanga in two mauritian banks.

===== Detention =====
On October 24, 2025, he was placed under arrest by the Mauritian authorities for embezzlement and money laundering. Several of his requests for bail were denied.

During his detention in Mauritius, between February and March 2026, he became the subject of three international arrest warrants issued by Madagascar for various financial cases. The first concerns a fraud case linked to the export of Malagasy lychees to France, the second relates to the clandestine delivery of Boeing 777 aircraft to Iran, and the third for secret commissions on the privatization of the state-owned company Kraoma in 2023, which operates a chromite mine in Brieville.

In May 2026, following a decision by the Malagasy Anti-Corruption Unit, Sodiat, his conglomerate and all companies registered in the name of his wife and three children were placed under judicial administration. Economist Serge Jovial Imbeh, a former candidate in the 2018 presidential election, was appointed provisional administrator of these companies.

== Cases and scandals ==
Although Mamy Ravatomanga holds no official position within the presidency, he is frequently described as one of Andry Rajoelina’s key financial backers; he is accused of contributing to state capture, exerting significant influence over administrative appointments and decisions, and leveraging public institutions to serve his own interests.

Media reports have linked him to several financial crime cases in Madagascar, Mauritius, and France.

In 2018, his name surfaced in the Panama Papers scandal; notably, he was a majority shareholder in a shell company registered in the British Virgin Islands.

In Madagascar, he faces accusations—among others—of abuse of office and the misappropriation of public funds at the expense of the national water and electricity utility, Jirama, during his tenure on its board of directors.

=== Rosewood trafficking ===
Mamy Ravatomanga has been implicated in several cases involving the illegal export of rosewood to Asia—facilitated by state exemptions or through false declarations labeling the cargo as ilmenite—during the transition period following the 2009 Malagasy political crisis. He allegedly also used shell companies based in Mauritius to launder or conceal a portion of the proceeds from this activity. In 2015, he was placed under a travel ban, and his home was searched on May 26, 2016. A preliminary investigation was launched in 2015 by the National Financial Prosecutor's Office regarding organized money laundering, tax fraud, and rosewood trafficking; the case was subsequently closed without further action in 2023. These matters are being re-examined following Mamy Ravatomanga's arrest in October 2025.

Several endemic Malagasy species of the genus Dalbergia (including Dalbergia maritima and Dalbergia baronii) produce a prized timber commonly known as rosewood. Classified as endangered species by the IUCN, their logging, sale, transport, and export have been prohibited since 2010. These species are targets of illegal logging. Illegal exploitation surged after Andry Rajoelina came to power in a 2009 coup d'état, particularly within the Masoala and Marojejy National Parks.

=== The Madarail Affair ===
In 1994, while working as a road haulier, Mamy Ravatomanga secured a monopoly on the transport of hydrocarbons between Toamasina and the capital, Antananarivo, following the shutdown of the Tananarive-East Coast line—the country's main logistical artery—in the wake of Cyclone Geralda. Deprived of its primary market, the railway company Madarail was privatized in 2002. In 2011, Ravatomanga acquired a three-quarter stake in Madarail, becoming the company's principal shareholder.

In 2022, an investigation by the NGO Transparency International revealed how state subsidies intended to revitalize the company were largely misappropriated, even as the company's operations continued to decline.

=== The Balkany case and the Levallois properties case ===
He is also involved in the legal scandals of Patrick Balkany. In February 2016, the French National Financial Prosecutor's office (PNF) opened an investigation against him and his wife, Ramy Rakotoniary, for "organized money laundering" and "tax fraud" in the acquisition of several real estate properties in the Paris suburbs, in Levallois-Perret, via opaque financial arrangements involving offshore companies, some of which are based in Mauritius. From June 2018 to June 2019, four of his properties in the Paris suburbs were seized as part of the preliminary investigation opened by the PNF.

In August 2023, the preliminary investigation by the PNF opened against Mamy Ravatomanga was cancelled. This procedure related to acts of money laundering in an organized gang, corruption of a public official, tax evasion and trafficking in rosewood. The PNF justified this decision, on the grounds of an “insufficiently serious offence”.

=== Carlos Ghosn case ===
He is involved in the Carlos Ghosn affair. Indeed, one of the planes of the Malagasy airline TOA, one of its subsidiaries, was used by the ex-CEO of Renault-Nissan-Mitsubishi to illegally flee Japan.

=== Monopoly on the vanilla and lychee exportations ===
Madagascar is the world's leading producer of Bourbon vanilla and a key exporter of lychees to Europe in December. Due to his conglomerate's involvement in the vanilla and lychee markets, he is accused of monopolistic practices and impoverishing small producers.

In November 2022, the NGO Transparency International Madagascar published an investigation into the control over the export of Malagasy lychees to France and Europe by individuals close to the ruling power. The NGO calls for an investigation into corruption and money laundering against the organizations and individuals involved in the export of Malagasy lychees to France, including Mamy Ravatomanga, a member of the board of directors of the Groupement des exporters de litchis and one of the main exporters of Malagasy litchis to France, via one of its subsidiaries.

=== Revelations by Colonel Patrick Rakotomamonjy ===
In May 2025, Colonel Patrick Rakotomamonjy, director of the Soavinandriana military hospital, released a video claiming that Mamy Ravatomanga was at the heart of a "state scandal," alleging the existence of a corruption network akin to a "state mafia" with political and economic ramifications. In this video, he accuses him, among other things, of corruption, undue influence, as well as intimidation and death threats. He also denounces institutionalized racketeering at the Ilafy polyclinic, a private health facility belonging to Mamy Ravatomanga, during medical evacuations abroad. He further accuses him of being the de facto head of state of the country.

Following these revelations, the Malagasy branch of Transparency International reacted by describing the accusations as "serious" and "impossible to ignore." The organization called for the opening of an independent investigation.

=== Boeing aircraft delivered to Iran case ===
In July 2025, five Boeing 777-200 aircraft were located in Iran, despite being subject to international sanctions, operating under the colors of the Iranian airline Mahan Air. It was later revealed that these planes, originating from various Southeast Asian countries, had initially been provisionally registered in Madagascar to circumvent these sanctions.

On October 20, 2025, he was named in an official document obtained by AFP, along with others, including Valery Ramonjavelo, the Director General of Civil Aviation of Madagascar, as being involved in this affair.
