= Richard Ravalomanana =

Malagasy politician (born 1959)

President of the Senate of Madagascar
- In office 12 October 2023 – 13 October 2025
- Preceded by: Herimanana Razafimahefa
- Succeeded by: Jean André Ndremanjary (acting)

Acting President of Madagascar
- In office 27 October 2023 – 16 December 2023
- Prime Minister: Christian Ntsay
- Preceded by: Christian Ntsay (acting)
- Succeeded by: Andry Rajoelina

Personal details
- Born: 14 December 1959 (age 66) Madagascar
- Party: IRMAR

Richard Ravalomanana (born 14 December 1959) is a Malagasy politician and former military officer who served as president of the Senate of Madagascar from 2023 to 2025. He also briefly served as acting president of Madagascar in 2023 during the re-election of President Andry Rajoelina. Some media outlets have said that he is a collaborator of Rajoelina.

== Biography ==
=== Military career ===
Richard Ravalomanana began his military career as a second lieutenant in 1986. He spent about forty years in the armed forces, including service at the Mahazoarivo Palace, the residence of the Prime Minister.

During the 2009 Malagasy political crisis, he led a mutiny and the attack on the Intervention Force gendarmerie camp, whose commander, General Zafera, had hesitated to join the pro-Rajoelina camp. After Rajoelina's coup d'État, Ravalomanana was promoted and appointed commander of the interregional district of the national gendarmerie in Antananarivo. During the transitional period that followed, he effectively exercised command of the armed forces, opposing Rajoelina's adversaries and repeatedly refusing the return from exile of former president Marc Ravalomanana.

Remaining loyal to the new regime, he quickly rose to the rank of Army Corps General and held various command positions, notably as head of the national gendarmerie. He was Commander of the Gendarmerie from 2012 to 2014.

When Hery Rajaonarimampianina came to power in 2014, he was removed from his position as Commander of the National Gendarmerie.

=== Political career ===
He has served as Special Advisor to President Andry Rajoelina for National Security Affairs from 2022 to 2023. He was appointed to the Senate on 8 September 2023, and belong to IRMAR group. Immediately after Razafimahefa was unanimously removed from his position as Senate President by a special Senate session on 12 October 2023, elections were held for Senate President. In the election for Senate President, Ravalomanana was elected as Senate President with 15 votes in favor and 3 abstentions.

On 27 October 2023, the Constitutional Court ruled that presidential powers must be exercised by the President of the Senate, and Ravalomanana assumed the office of interim president.

=== Impeachment ===
On 12 October 2025, while a protest movement was held nationwide, the CAPSAT military unit refused to open fire on the crowd and joins the demonstrators. President Rajoelina then left the country. The same day, Richard Ravalomanana was removed from as President of the Senate by the chamber. According to some media outlets, he later fled to Dubai.

=== Arrest ===
On 23 December 2025, Ravalomanana was ordered to present himself to a military camp in the capital as part of an investigation for crimes against the security of the state. When he failed to appear, security forces attempted to arrest him, but retreated when he expressed his intent to take arms to protect himself from arrest. On 27 December, a high-ranking official from the Ministry of Justice met him and convinced him to surrender. According to the authorities, charges held against him included usurpation of functions, threats to state security, incitement to hatred, as well as complicity in murder and battery, all related to his behavior during the October protests. He was particularly accused of personally giving orders to the security forces covering the protests, something his office legally barred him from doing.

After being initially held in house arrest at a house belonging to former Prime Minister Christian Ntsay, Ravalomanana was transferred on 19 January 2026 to a high security prison in Imerintsiatosika. On 1 September, he was convicted of complicity in murder over the killing of demonstrators during the 2025 protests and sentenced to 10 years' hard labour.

== Boeing aircraft delivered to Iran affair ==
In July 2025, five Boeing 777-200 aircraft were located in Iran, operating under the colors of the Iranian airline Mahan Air, despite U.S. sanctions. It was later revealed that these aircraft, originating from various Southeast Asian countries, had first obtained provisional registration in Madagascar to bypass these sanctions.

On 31 July, during a Senate session, when questioned about the necessity of a parliamentary inquiry requested by several deputies, Richard Ravalomanana firmly opposed it. On 1 August 2025, the Order of Journalists of Madagascar (OJM) condemned in a statement Ravalomanana’s “reaction and inappropriate remarks” towards a journalist, considering them an attack on press freedom.

Former Deputy Prime Minister Zaza Ramandimbiarison directly accused Richard Ravalomanana of collusion and of “treason against national sovereignty”, and called for his resignation.

On 24 August 2025, after an investigation carried out by the Anti-Corruption Unit, 22 people were placed in pre-trial detention for “corruption, abuse of office, forgery in public documents, criminal association and concealment, usurpation of titles, and threats to state security”. The Minister of Transport, Valéry Ramonjavelo, was dismissed from his position on 29 August. Among those indicted was Khushwinder Singh, an Indian national, described by several media outlets as an unofficial adviser to Senate President Richard Ravalomanana, and identified as one of the main suspects. The case took on an international dimension with the involvement of the FBI, Interpol, and the ICAO, which were called upon to support the investigation.

Political offices
Preceded by Christian Ntsay; Acting	President of Madagascar; Acting; 2023	Succeeded by Andry Rajoelina
