= Honoré Rakotomanana =

Malagasy politician and first Deputy Prosecutor of the ICTR

Honoré Rakotomanana (born 26 October 1933) is a Malagasy politician and judge. Beginning in 1995, he was the first Deputy Prosecutor of the International Criminal Tribunal for Rwanda (ICTR), but was forced to resign in 1997 due to charges of incompetence. From February 2016 to November 2017, he was Speaker of the Senate of Madagascar.

== Career ==
Rakotomanana was a judge in Madagascar prior to his appointment to the ICTR. On 20 March 1995, on the recommendation of ICTR Prosecutor Richard Goldstone, United Nations Secretary-General Kofi Annan appointed Rakotomanana as the first Deputy Prosecutor of the ICTR. Because Goldstone was based on The Hague, Netherlands, Rakotomanana was in charge of the day-to-day operations of the ICTR prosecutor's office in Kigali, Rwanda.

On 26 February 1997 Rakotomanana and ICTR Registrar Andronico Adede of Kenya resigned their positions after meeting with Annan after a report criticised Adede with mismanagement of ICTR funds and Rakotomanana with failing to pursue the masterminds of the Rwandan genocide. Rakotamana stated that he resigned "because of divergences of views between my hierarchial [sic] superiors and myself and in the superior interests of the population of Rwanda."

In 2001, Rakotomanana became the Speaker of the Senate of Madagascar when it resumed sitting for the first time since 1972; he was elected to the position by a vote of 89–1 by the new Malagasy senators. Rakotomanana is a member of the Association for the Rebirth of Madagascar party.

After the reconvening of the Senate Rakotomanana was re-elected its President on 9 February 2016.
