= Christian Ntsay =

Prime Minister of Madagascar from 2018 to 2025

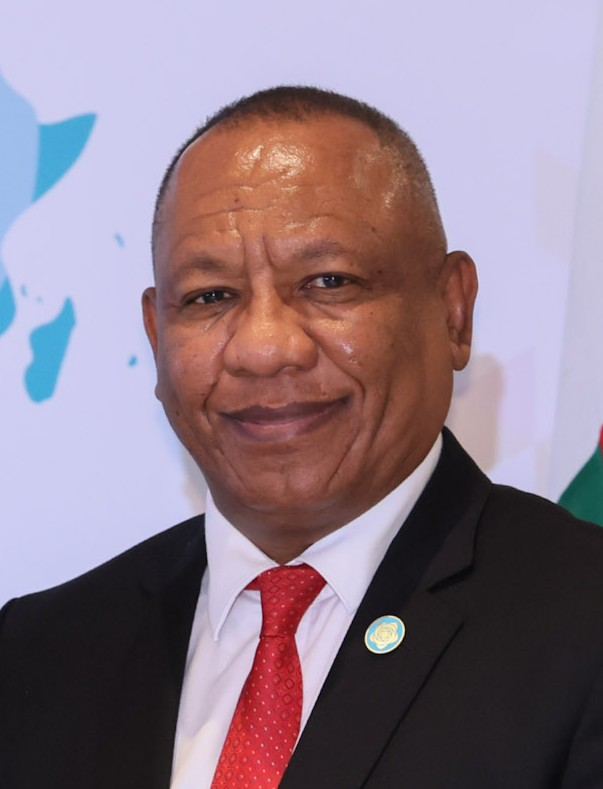
- Ntsay in 2025

28th Prime Minister of Madagascar
- In office 4 June 2018 – 6 October 2025
- President: See list: Hery Rajaonarimampianina; Rivo Rakotovao (acting); Andry Rajoelina; Himself (acting); Richard Ravalomanana (acting); Andry Rajoelina
- Preceded by: Olivier Mahafaly Solonandrasana
- Succeeded by: Ruphin Zafisambo

Acting President of Madagascar
- In office 9 September 2023 – 27 October 2023
- Prime Minister: Himself
- Preceded by: Andry Rajoelina
- Succeeded by: Richard Ravalomanana (acting)

Representative of the International Labour Organization in Antananarivo for the Comoros, Madagascar, Mauritius, and Seychelles
- In office 2008 – 4 June 2018

Minister of Tourism of Madagascar
- In office 18 June 2002 – 16 January 2003
- President: Marc Ravalomanana
- Prime Minister: Jacques Sylla
- Preceded by: Blandin Razafimanjato
- Succeeded by: Roger Mahazoasy

Personal details
- Born: Christian Louis Ntsay; 27 March 1961 (age 65) Diégo-Suarez, Madagascar
- Party: Independent
- Spouse: Married
- Children: 2

Christian Louis Ntsay (born 27 March 1961) is a Malagasy politician who served as the 28th Prime Minister of Madagascar from 2018 to 2025 and served as acting President in 2023. Prior to his tenure as prime minister he was Minister of Tourism from 2002 to 2003 and Madagascar's representative to the International Labour Organization from 2008 to 2018.

== Early life ==
Christian Louis Ntsay was born in Diégo-Suarez, Madagascar, on 27 March 1961. He graduated from the University of Antananarivo with a Bachelor of Economics degree after attending from 1982 to 1985, and from the Centers for Financial, Economic and Banking Studies in Paris, France, with a doctorate in business management and direction techniques after attending from 1985 to 1986.

== Career ==
The Radio Fréquence Plus Madagascar was founded by Ntsay and he served as its first president from 1992 to 2001. He was the general manager of the SOLIMA oil company in Madagascar from 1993 to 1997.

From 1998 to 2007, Ntsay was a consultant for the World Bank, European Union, International Trade Centre, United Nations Development Programme, and United Nations Population Fund. He was the Minister of Tourism from 2002 to 2003. Ntasy was Madagascar's representative to the International Labour Organization from 2008 to 4 June 2018.

Prime Minister Olivier Mahafaly Solonandrasana resigned on 4 June 2018. President Hery Rajaonarimampianina appointed Ntsay to replace Solonandrasana as prime minister. Ntsay was acting president in charge of a national unity government before the 2023 presidential election. 11 of the 13 presidential candidates accused Ntsay, who was aligned with Andry Rajoelina, of performing an institutional coup.

As a result of widespread protests against water and power cuts in September 2025, Rajoelina announced that Ntsay's government would be terminated on 29 September 2025. Rajoelina maintained Ntsay's government in a caretaker role until a new Prime Minister was appointed, for which he assigned three days for selection.

Amid the 2025 Malagasy coup d'état on 12 October 2025, Ntsay went to Mauritius aboard a private flight along with one of Rajoelina's advisers, Mamy Ravatomanga.

== Personal life ==
Ntsay is married with two children. He speaks Malagasy, English, and French.

== Works cited ==
=== News ===
- "Madagascar's president appoints new prime minister". Africanews. 4 June 2018. Archived from the original on 29 June 2025.
- "Madagascar: President Rajoelina reappoints Ntsay as PM". Africanews. 13 August 2024. Archived from the original on 29 June 2025.
- "Madagascar prime minister announces resignation". Rappler. 4 June 2018. Archived from the original on 29 June 2025.
- Zulu, Phathizwe (3 October 2023). "Security forces in Madagascar fire tear gas to disperse opposition candidates, supporters". Anadolu Agency. Archived from the original on 29 June 2025.

=== Web ===
- "Members of the Government". Prime Minister of Madagascar. 16 January 2024. Archived from the original on 1 April 2025.
- "Zambia". Inter-Parliamentary Union. Archived from the original on 29 June 2025.

Political offices
Preceded by Olivier Mahafaly Solonandrasana	Prime Minister of Madagascar; 2018–2025	Succeeded by Ruphin Zafisambo
Preceded by Andry Rajoelina	Prime Minister of Madagascar; 2023	Succeeded by Richard Ravalomanana; Acting
Preceded by Blandin Razafimanjato	Minister of Tourism of Madagascar; 2002–2003	Succeeded by Roger Mahazoasy
