= How to Steal a City =

Book by Crispian Olver

- Author: Crispian Olver
- Language: English
- Subject: Nelson Mandela Bay Metropolitan Municipality, Local government, Corruption in South Africa, Politics of South Africa
- Genre: Non-fiction, Autobiography, Memoir
- Set in: Nelson Mandela Bay Metropolitan Municipality
- Published: Cape Town
- Publisher: Jonathan Ball Publishers
- Publication date: 23 October 2017
- Publication place: South Africa
- Pages: 280
- ISBN: 978-1-86842-820-5 (Paperback)

How to Steal a City (2017) is a book by Crispian Olver, a medical doctor and government official, from South Africa. The book is about the process of state capture and corruption within the Nelson Mandela Bay Metropolitan Municipality, how it grew and efforts made by the government to fight it.

== Background and synopsis ==
In the book Olver alleges that the metro's government was controlled by a criminal syndicate closely associated with the African National Congress (ANC). The book details how the syndicate had built a sophisticated network of front companies, improper tenders, and a network of corrupt local officials that the syndicate used to steal large amounts of public money from local government. The book concludes that the corruption, political divisions, and political disenchantment that the situation created led to the ANC's losing the municipality in the 2016 municipal elections, despite the region's being an ANC political stronghold in the past.

== Reception ==
The book was widely discussed in the media at the time of its publication. Kristoff Adelbert, chief of staff for Nelson Mandela Bay Metropolitan Municipality, stated that all the allegations in the book would be investigated in an effort to fight corruption.
