= Minister of Education (Madagascar) =

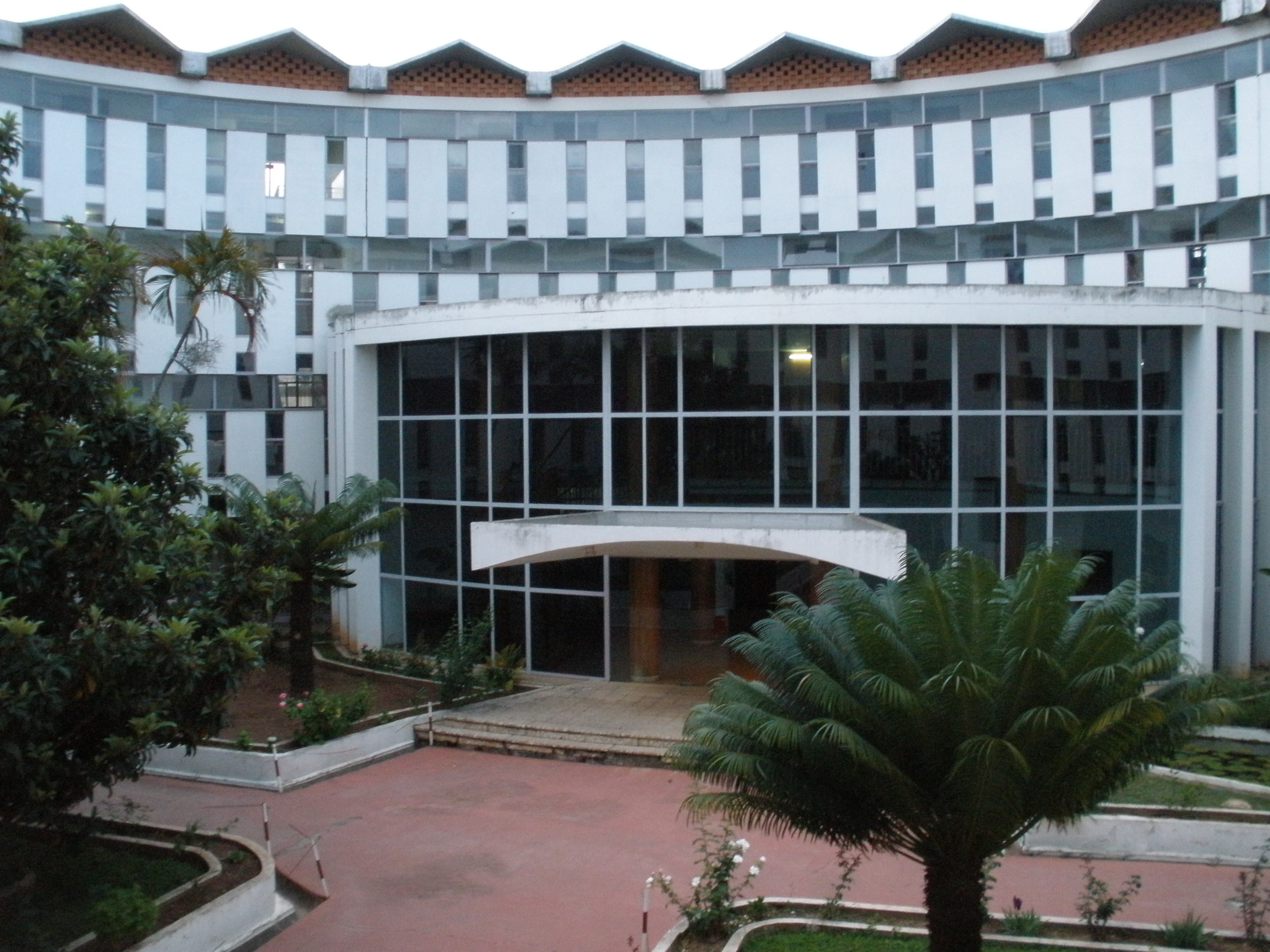
Ministry of Education of Madagascar

Minister of Education is a government minister in charge of the Madagascar's Ministry of National Education (Le Ministre de l’Éducation Nationale, MEN). It was formerly known as Ministry of National Education, Technical and Vocational Education (l'Education nationale, de l'enseignement technique et professionnel, MENETP) until it was reorganized in August 2020. where it was split into MEN and Ministère de l’Enseignement Technique et de la Formation Professionnelle (METFP)

== List of office holders ==
- Julien Razafimanazato (March 2009 – March 2011)
- Manoro Régis (2011- ?)
- Paul Andrianiaina Rabary (2014-2018)
- Marie Thérèse Volahaingo (before 2019-20 Jan 2020)
- Rijasoa Andriamanana (20 Jan 2020-4 June 2020)
- Marie Michelle Sahondrarimalala (21 August 2020–present)
