= Andry Rajoelina =

President of Madagascar (2009–2014; 2019–2025)

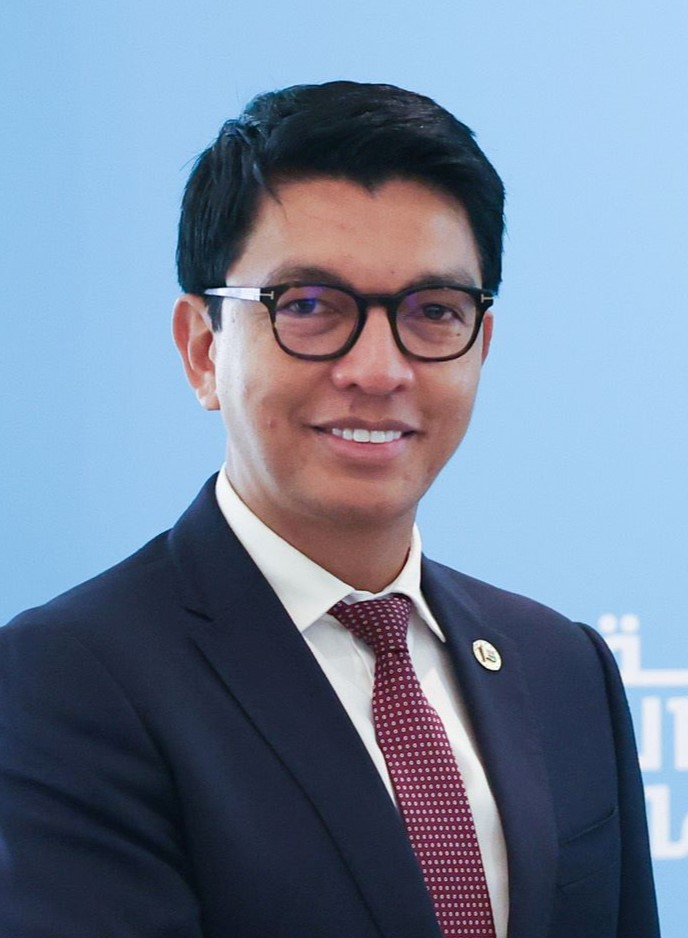
- Rajoelina in 2024

8th President of Madagascar
- In office 16 December 2023 – 14 October 2025
- Prime Minister: Christian Ntsay; Ruphin Zafisambo
- Preceded by: Richard Ravalomanana (acting)
- Succeeded by: Michael Randrianirina
- In office 19 January 2019 – 9 September 2023
- Prime Minister: Christian Ntsay
- Preceded by: Rivo Rakotovao (acting)
- Succeeded by: Christian Ntsay (acting)
- In office 17 March 2009 – 25 January 2014 as President of the High Transitional Authority of Madagascar
- Prime Minister: See list: Monja Roindefo; Eugène Mangalaza; Cécile Manorohanta (acting); Albert Camille Vital; Omer Beriziky
- Preceded by: Marc Ravalomanana; Hyppolite Ramaroson (as Head of the Military Directorate)
- Succeeded by: Hery Rajaonarimampianina

51st Mayor of Antananarivo
- In office 12 December 2007 – 3 February 2009
- Preceded by: Hery Rafalimanan
- Succeeded by: Guy Randrianarisoa (acting)

Personal details
- Born: Andry Nirina Rajoelina; 30 May 1974 (age 52) Antsirabe, Madagascar
- Citizenship: Madagascar (until 2025); France (since 2014)
- Party: Young Malagasies Determined
- Spouse: Mialy Razakandisa (m. 2000)
- Children: 3
- Website: www.andry-rajoelina.org

Andry Nirina Rajoelina (Note: Pronounced /ˈɑːndriː rɑːdʒoʊiːˈliːnɑː/; Malagasy: [ˈjanɖʐʲ nʲˈrinᵊ ratʐˈwelinᵊ].) (born 30 May 1974) is a politician and businessman who served as the eighth president of Madagascar from 2019 to 2025. He was previously President of the High Transitional Authority from 2009 to 2014 following a political crisis and military-backed coup, having held the office of Mayor of Antananarivo for one year prior. Before entering the political arena, Rajoelina was involved in the private sector, including a printing and advertising company called Injet in 1999 and the Viva radio and television networks in 2007.

He formed the political party Young Malagasies Determined and was elected Mayor of Antananarivo in 2007. While in this position, he led an opposition movement against then-President Marc Ravalomanana that culminated in a 2009 political crisis. Rajoelina was appointed as President of the High Transitional Authority of Madagascar (HTA) by a military council, in a move characterised as a coup d'état by the international community. Rajoelina dissolved the Senate and National Assembly, and transferred their powers to a variety of new governance structures responsible for overseeing the transition toward a new constitutional authority. This conflicted with an internationally mediated process to establish a transitional government. Voters approved a new constitution in a controversial national referendum in November 2010, ushering in the Fourth Republic.

He held the Presidency of the HTA until general elections were held in 2013, and stepped down in 2014. He won the 2018 presidential election and was inaugurated President of Madagascar on 19 January 2019. His tenure included directing the government's response to the COVID-19 pandemic in Madagascar, during which he promoted misinformation and unproven treatments for the disease, as well as a 2021 food insecurity crisis and Cyclone Batsirai. Rajoelina then proceeded to win the 2023 Malagasy presidential election.

In September 2025, widespread protests erupted against frequent water and power cuts, causing the deaths of over 20 people. In response, Rajoelina fired Prime Minister Christian Ntsay on 29 September 2025. He said, without providing evidence, that some politicians were plotting to take advantage of the protests and had considered staging a coup while he was addressing the United Nations. On 12 October, Rajoelina's office said that an attempt to topple his government was underway; a statement said the situation was under control. However, on 13 October, an opposition lawmaker reported that Rajoelina had fled the country. Rajoelina addressed the nation later that day, stating that he fled "in fear for his life" but remained defiant, saying that he "would not allow Madagascar to be destroyed" and refusing to step down. After attempting to dissolve the National Assembly, he was impeached and removed from office as the military announced that they had seized power.

== Early life and education ==
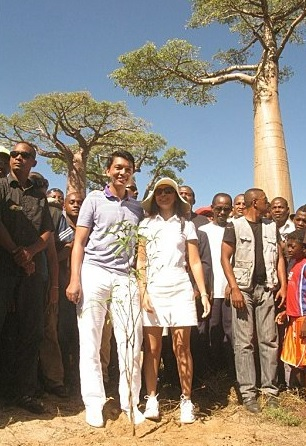
Andry Rajoelina and his wife Mialy in 2012

Andry Rajoelina was born on 30 May 1974 to a relatively wealthy family in Antsirabe. His father, now-retired Colonel Roger Yves Rajoelina, held dual Malagasy/French nationality and fought for the French army in the Algerian War. Although his family could afford a college education for their son, Andry Rajoelina opted to discontinue his studies after completing his baccalauréat to launch a career as a DJ.

== Personal life ==
In 1994, Rajoelina met his future wife Mialy Razakandisa, who was then completing her senior year of high school in Antananarivo. The couple maintained a long-distance relationship for six years while Mialy completed her undergraduate and masters studies in finance and accounting in Paris. They reunited in Madagascar in 2000 and married that same year. They have three children, born in 2001, 2003, and 2005.

== Business and media career ==
In 1993, at the age of 19, Rajoelina established his first enterprise, a small event production company called Show Business. Before launching his events business, Rajoelina worked as a disc jockey in nightclubs in Antananarivo and became known for promoting music events among the city's youth.

In 1999, he launched Injet, a digital printing company that expanded into large-format and billboard advertising in Antananarivo. Following his marriage in 2000, Andry and Mialy Rajoelina took over Domapub, a competing Antananarivo-based billboard advertising business owned by his wife's family. The couple divided responsibilities in the family businesses, with Andry primarily overseeing Injet and Mialy managing Domapub.

In May 2007, Rajoelina purchased the Ravinala television and radio stations and renamed them Viva TV and Viva FM, adding broadcast media to his existing activities in events and outdoor advertising.

== Mayor of Antananarivo (2007–2009) ==
=== Elections ===
In 2007, Rajoelina created and led the political association Tanora malaGasy Vonona (TGV), translating to "determined Malagasy youth", and shortly afterward announced his candidacy to run for Mayor of Antananarivo. His very young age became a lever to gain a quick popularity throughout the nation reflecting a trend of "jeunification of politics" - the promotion of younger leaders as symbols of political renewal and change. Rajoelina was elected on 12 December 2007 with 63.3% of the vote on a 55% voter turnout, beating TIM party incumbent Hery Rafalimanana.

=== Opposition movement against Ravalomanana ===
The first conflicts between Andry Rajoelina and president Marc Ravalomanana date back to 2003, when the national government ordered the removal of Antananarivo's first Trivision advertising panels, which Rajoelina had installed at a major roundabout in the capital.

In November and December 2008, the government became embroiled in two scandals. A July 2008 deal with Daewoo Logistics to lease half the island's arable land for South Korean cultivation of corn and palm oil, and the November 2008 purchase of a second presidential jet, a Boeing 737, at a cost of US$60 million, which led the World Bank and the IMF to suspend $35 million worth of financial support to the Island. Rajoelina used this to garner support against Ravalomanana's government.

At the beginning of Rajoelina's tenure as mayor, the Antananarivo's treasury had a debt of 8.2 billion Malagasy Ariary (approximately US$4.6 million). On 4 January 2008, due to unpaid debts to the Jirama, the city of Antananarivo was hit by a general water cutoff, and brownouts of the city's street lights. After an audit, it was found that the Jirama owed about the same amount of money to the City Hall, and the sanction on the city's population was retrieved.

On 13 December 2008, the national government closed Andry Rajoelina's Viva TV, stating that a Viva interview with exiled former head of state Didier Ratsiraka was "likely to disturb peace and security". Within a week Rajoelina met with 20 of Madagascar's most prominent opposition leaders, referred to in the press as the "Club of 20", to develop a joint statement demanding that the Ravalomanana administration improve its adherence to democratic principles. Rajoelina also promised to dedicate a politically open public space in the capital which he would call Place de la Démocratie ("Democracy Plaza").

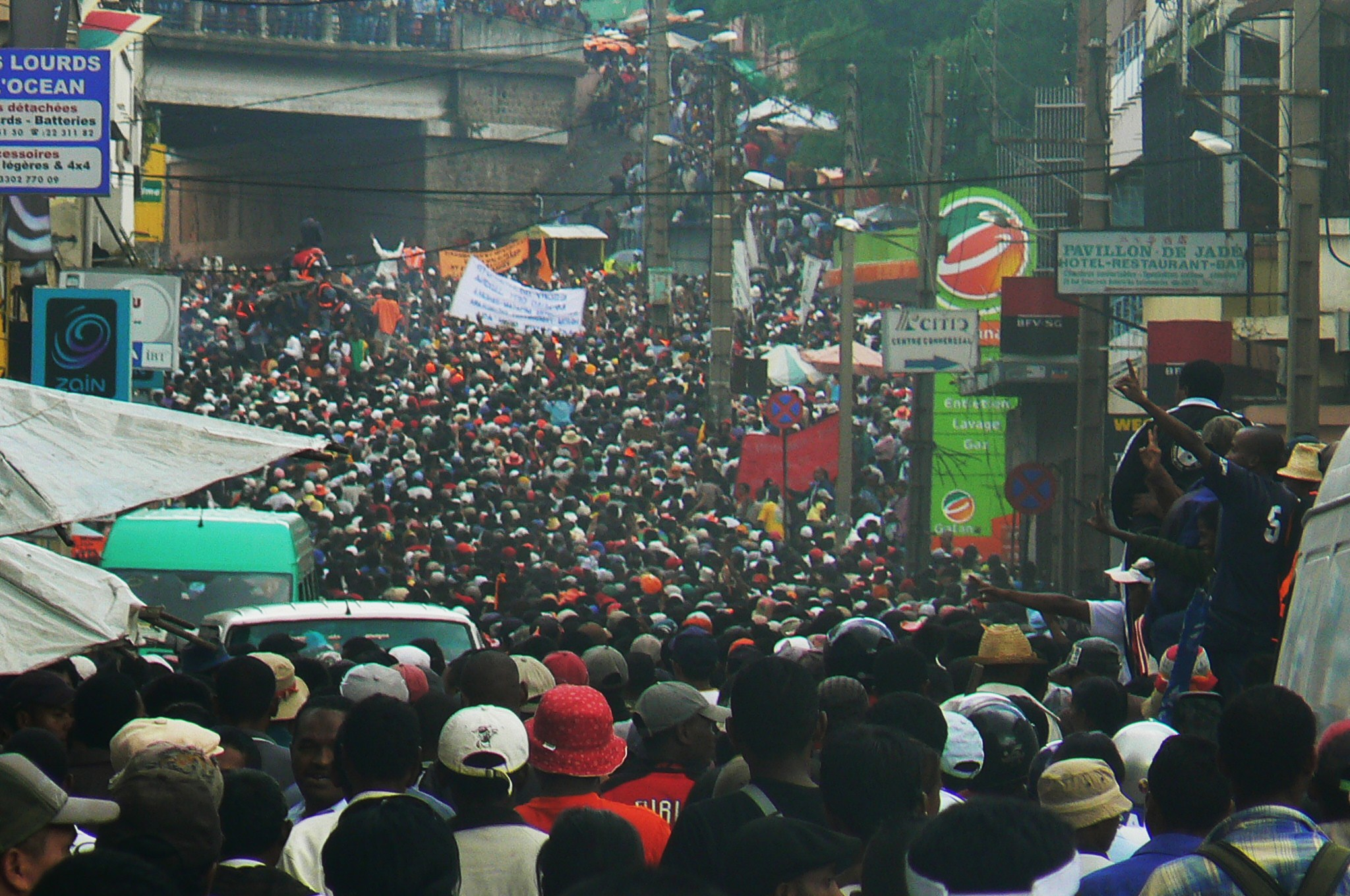
Pro-Rajoelina protesters in Antananarivo, 2009

Beginning in January 2009, Andry Rajoelina led a series of political rallies in downtown Antananarivo. On 13 January, he launched an ultimatum to the government to restore Viva TV. A week later, the transmission failure message of Viva TV was changed to a still picture of Andry Rajoelina, which led the authorities to seize the channel's transmitter by force. On 17 January, Andry Rajoelina gathered 30,000 supporters at a public park which he renamed Place de la Démocratie to defy the public executive power of Ravalomanana. At a rally on 31 January 2009, Rajoelina announced that he was in charge of the country's affairs, declaring: "Since the president and the government have not assumed their responsibilities, I therefore proclaim that I will run all national affairs as of today." He added that a request for President Ravalomanana to formally resign would shortly be filed with the Parliament of Madagascar. This self-declaration of power discredited Rajoelina's democratic aims, and the number of attendees at subsequent rallies declined, averaging around 3,000 to 5,000 participants.

=== Destitution ===
On 3 February, the Ministry of Domestic Affairs dismissed Rajoelina as mayor of Antananarivo and appointed a special delegation headed by Guy Randrianarisoa to manage the affairs of the capital. Andry Rajoelina contested the decision.

== President of the High Transitional Authority (2009–2014) ==
=== 2009 political crisis, coup d'état and deaths ===
In late 2008 and early 2009, Andry Rajoelina emerged as the main opposition figure to President Marc Ravalomanana. After the government closed Viva TV, a station owned by Rajoelina, he launched a series of large anti-government demonstrations in Antananarivo in January 2009, denouncing what he described as the president's increasingly authoritarian rule and alleged corruption. As protests spread and some turned into riots and looting, at least 135 people were reported killed nationwide in the unrest, according to international and regional observers.

A key turning point came on 7 February 2009, when a march towards the Ambohitsorohitra presidential palace ended in a massacre, killing at least 31 people and injuring many more, according to Amnesty International and other human-rights observers. Amensty International deemed these killings to be unlawful, while allegations by Colonel Charles Andrianasoavina suggested that Rajoelina himself was the ochestrator. In a later report reviewing the 2009 crisis, Amnesty International concluded that serious human-rights violations, including unlawful killings and excessive use of force by security forces under both the pre-coup government and the transitional authorities, had not been effectively investigated and that those responsible had not been brought to justice.

On 17 March 2009, amid mounting demonstrations and a mutiny by parts of the armed forces, President Ravalomanana announced his resignation and stated that he was transferring power to a military directorate. The military leadership declined to govern directly and instead handed executive authority to Rajoelina, who was then 34 years old and therefore below the constitutional minimum age of 40 for the presidency. A newly created High Transitional Authority (Haute Autorité de la Transition, HAT) with Rajoelina at its head suspended parliament and ruled by decree during the transitional period.

Regional and international organisations widely regarded the transfer of power as an unconstitutional change of government. The African Union's Peace and Security Council stated that the events met its definition of an "unconstitutional change of government" and suspended Madagascar from AU activities, while an AU ambassador described the handover of power to Rajoelina by the military as a "civilian and military coup d'état". The Southern African Development Community (SADC) also suspended Madagascar, and the United Nations, European Union and other international actors declined to recognise the transitional government at that time.

In its review of Madagascar, the United Nations Human Rights Council expressed concern about human-rights violations during the crisis, including killings, unlawful arrests, arbitrary detentions, restrictions on freedom of expression and "deaths of unarmed persons during riots" before the HAT took power. The United States government and several other donors characterised the power transfer as a coup d'état and suspended almost all non-humanitarian assistance, contributing to a sharp decline in external budget support and deepening the country's economic crisis.

Overall, contemporary reporting by international organisations, foreign governments and human-rights groups portrays the 2009 crisis as a period of intense political confrontation in which security forces under different authorities committed serious abuses, more than 130 people were killed, and the subsequent transfer of power to Rajoelina was widely treated as unconstitutional and described as a coup d'état.

=== Resignation of Ravalomanana ===
On 7 February, Andry Rajoelina organized a new rally during which the leaders of the orange movement declared the constitution of a High Transitional Authority and Andry Rajoelina as its president. The crowd then marched towards the Presidential palace to state its claim to power. The presidential guards opened fire, killing 31 protesters, and wounding more than 200. This massacre dramatically diminished the Presidency's popularity in the crisis, and led to losing its support from the Army which blamed the President for ordering the shooting.

On 6 March, after the Malagasy authorities attempted to arrest him, Andry Rajoelina took refuge in the French embassy. On 10 March, the Army issued a 72-hour ultimatum, ordering the political leaders to find a solution to the crisis, or face military intervention. On 15 March, Ravalomanana went on air to propose a referendum to solve the crisis, an offer refused by Rajoelina who instead called for the President's arrest. The following day, Ravalomanana dissolved the government, resigned, and transferred the Presidential seal to a senior committee of the Army. On 18 March, the Army transferred power directly to Rajoelina, making him president of the High Transitional Authority (HAT). Madagascar's constitutional court deemed the double-transfer of power (Ravalomanana-Army-Rajoelina) to be lawful.

Rajoelina was sworn in as president on 21 March 2009 at Mahamasina stadium before a crowd of 40,000 supporters. He was 35 years of age when sworn in, making him the youngest president in the country's history and the youngest head of government in the world at that time.

=== Resolution of the political conflict ===
On 19 March 2009, the SADC announced it did not recognize the new government. The African Union described the events as a coup d'état and suspended Madagascar and threatened sanctions if the constitutional government was not restored within six months. The United States, Madagascar's largest bilateral donor and provider of humanitarian aid, also refused to acknowledge the Rajoelina administration, and ordered all nonessential embassy employees to leave the Island. Madagascar was removed from the list of beneficiaries of the African Growth and Opportunity Act (AGOA). In May 2009, the IMF also froze its aid to Madagascar. The UN responded to the power transfer by freezing 600 million euros in planned aid. Some analysts maintained that Rajoelina's legitimacy was conditional to free and fair elections.

In August 2009, the living historic Presidents of Madagascar (Rajoelina, Ravalomanana, Ratsiraka & Zafy) signed the Maputo Accords, which established guidelines for a period of consensual political transition. On 11 October 2009, Andry Rajoelina appointed Eugène Mangalaza as Prime Minister. Further guidelines were defined during the Addis Ababa reunion to split the presidential power with 2 co-presidents. The Malagasy former presidents were authorized to return to the Island, and Rajoelina named a new Prime Minister.

In November 2010, a constitutional referendum resulted in the adoption of the state's fourth constitution with 73% in favor and a voter turnout of 52.6%. One change made by the new constitution was to lower the minimum age for presidential candidates from 40 to 35, rendering the 36 year-old Rajoelina eligible for presidential candidacy. The new constitution mandated the leader of the High Transitional Authority – the position held by Rajoelina – be kept as interim president until an election could take place, and required presidential candidates to have lived in Madagascar for at least six months prior to the elections, effectively barring Ravalomanana and other opposition leaders living in exile in South Africa from running in the next election.

In June 2010, the EU announced the extension of its $600-million financial aid to Madagascar. In November 2011, his talk at the UN 66th Session of the United Nations General Assembly marked the first major form of international recognition of the Transition government. On 13 May 2011, Andry Rajoelina met with Alain Juppé, the French Minister of Foreign Affairs, and on 7 December 2011 he was officially received by the French President Nicolas Sarkozy.

An agreement was reached between Rajoelina, Ravalomanana, and regional Malagasy states in January 2013 to resolve the political crisis. The agreement stipulated that neither Rajoelina nor Ravalomanana would stand in the election planned for May. However, in May 2013, when Ravalomanana's wife announced her candidacy for the 2013 elections, Rajoelina saw it as a breach of contract and reintroduced his own candidacy for the elections. The situation led to the several postponements of the election by the electoral commission. A special electoral court ruled in August 2013 that the candidatures of Rajoelina, Ravalomanana and former president Ratsiraka were invalid and would not be permitted to run in the 2013 election. Andry Rajoelina then announced his endorsement of presidential candidate Hery Rajaonarimampianina, who went on to win the presidential election in December 2013. Andry Rajoelina officially stepped down as president of Madagascar on 25 January 2014.

Rajaonarimampianina set up the MAPAR committee to organize the selection of his cabinet, a process that extended over several months. During this time, Rajoelina sought to be nominated for the position of Prime Minister of Madagascar but Rajaonarimampianina picked Roger Kolo, with the support of the majority in the parliament. On 18 April, a cabinet was announced that comprised 31 members with varied political affiliations.

=== Allegations by Colonel Charles Andrianasoavina ===
In 2011–2012, Lieutenant-Colonel Charles Andrianasoavina, an army officer who had supported the mutiny at the CAPSAT barracks that helped bring Rajoelina to power, issued a series of written statements from prison about the January–February 2009 crisis. In these letters he described himself as one of the main collaborators of the Haute Autorité de Transition (HAT) and a key participant in the overthrow of President Marc Ravalomanana, and stated that his "confession" about the coup and the events of 7 February had caused embarrassment to the transitional authorities.

According to Madagascar Online, Andrianasoavina wrote that, contrary to the initial official version which focused on shots fired from inside the presidential palace, additional armed gendarmes had been secretly positioned in buildings along the avenue leading to the Ambohitsirohitra palace and had fired on demonstrators from behind and from the sides. In a letter dated 17 January 2011 and quoted by the site, he alleged that these elements, commanded by Colonel Lylison René de Rolland Urbain, were posted in buildings such as the former PSM offices, the Treasury, the Ministry of Finance and the Hôtel du Louvre, from which they opened fire on the crowd.

Regional media on Réunion island reported that Andrianasoavina addressed similar allegations in a letter sent to Joaquim Chissano, the Southern African Development Community (SADC) mediator for Madagascar. LINFO.re summarised his account as stating that preparatory meetings had been held at the home of a senior member of the Haute Autorité de Transition on the eve of the 7 February demonstration, in the presence of several CST (Conseil supérieur de la Transition) members and senior officers, and that the financing of the anti-government actions had been provided by business operators and figures close to the transitional authorities.

In a separate article marking the second anniversary of the events, LINFO.re noted that more than fifty people were killed on 7 February 2009 when supporters of Rajoelina attempted to enter the presidential compound, and that "the great unburdening" ("grand déballage") of Colonel Andrianasoavina had introduced new elements, including his assertion that a meeting had taken place the day before the massacre between several high-ranking officers and members of the de facto authorities. Madagascar-Tribune likewise reported that letters from Andrianasoavina and General Raoelina "gave another version of the facts", including the claim that some victims were hit by gunfire coming from buildings such as the Treasury and the Hôtel du Louvre rather than only from inside the palace.

=== Policies and governance ===
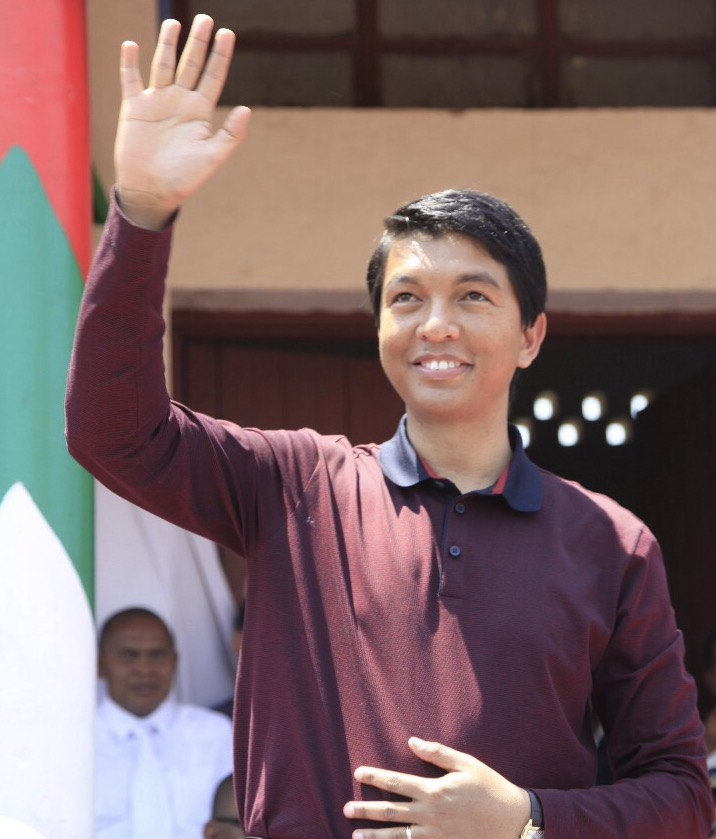
Andry Rajoelina in 2012

Upon taking office in 2009, Rajoelina dissolved the Senate and Parliament to transfer their powers to his cabinet, the officials of the HAT, and the newly established Council for social and economic strengthening, through which his policies were issued as decrees. Legislative authority rested in practice with Rajoelina and his cabinet, composed of his closest advisors. A military committee established in April increased HAT control over security and defense policy. The following month, after the suspension of the country's 22 regional governors, the Transitional government strengthened its influence over local government by naming replacements. The National Inquiry Commission (CNME) was established shortly thereafter to strengthen HAT effectiveness in addressing judicial and legal matters.

One of Andry Rajoelina's first measures as president was to cancel Ravalomanana's unpopular deal with Daewoo Logistics. On 2 June 2009, Ravalomanana was fined 70 million US dollars (42 million British pounds) and sentenced to four years in prison for alleged abuse of office which, according to HAT Justice Minister Christine Razanamahasoa, included the December 2008 purchase of a second presidential jet ("Air Force II") worth $60 million. Rajoelina also pursued legal action against Ravalomanana's company Tiko to reclaim 35 million US dollars in back taxes. Additionally, on 28 August 2010, the HAT sentenced Ravalomanana, who had been living in exile in South Africa since March 2009, in absentia to hard labor for life and issued an arrest warrant for his role in the protests and ensuing deaths. Rajoelina also rejected Ravalomanana's medium term development strategy, termed the Madagascar Action Plan, and abandoned education reforms initiated by his predecessor that adopted Malagasy and English as languages of instruction, instead returning to the traditional use of French. Later in 2012, he sold the controversial Boeing 747 bought by his predecessor with public funds.

Sanctions and suspension of donor aid amounted to 50% of the national budget and 70% of public investments, which obstructed the government's management of state affairs. Rajoelina occasionally organized events to distribute basic items to the population, including medicines, clothing, house maintenance materials and school supplies. His administration spent billions of ariary to subsidize basic needs like electricity, petrol, and food staples. In 2010, two years after Rajoelina launched the project as mayor of Antananarivo, the HAT completed the reconstruction of the Hotel de Ville (town hall) of Antananarivo which had been destroyed by arson during the rotaka political protests of 1972. During this ceremony, Andry Rajoelina announced that 11 December was a new holiday in the Malagasy calendar, and the fourth Constitution of the country was enacted.

Through the trano mora ("affordable house") initiative, the HAT built several subsidized housing developments intended for young middle class couples. Numerous other construction projects were planned or completed, including the restoration of historic staircases in Antananarivo built in the 19th century during the reign of Queen Ranavalona I; the repaving of the heavily traveled road between Toamasina and Foulpointe; the construction of a 15,000-capacity municipal stadium and new town hall in Toamasina; and the construction of a hospital built to international standards in Toamasina.

== 2018 presidential campaign ==
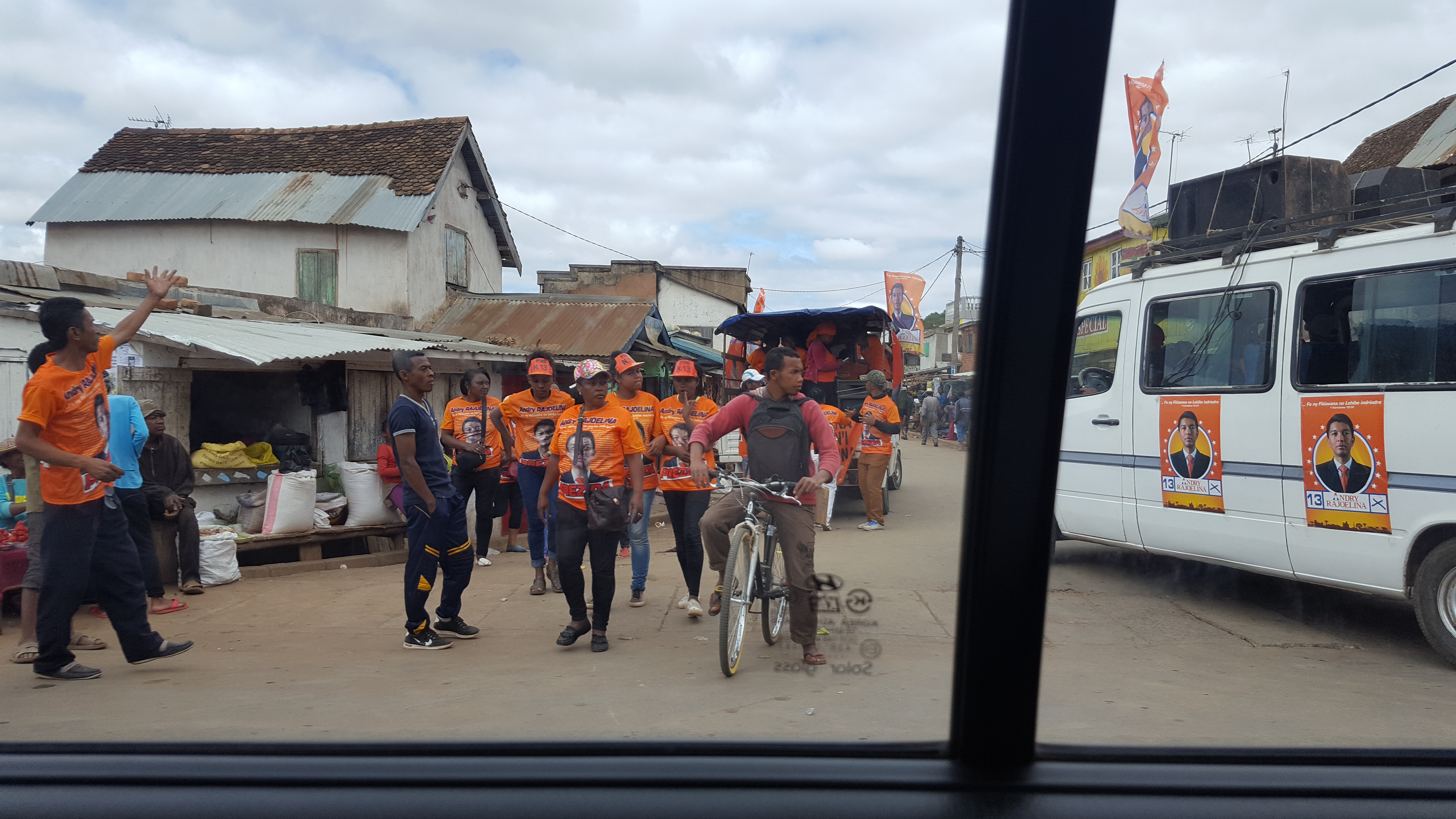
Campaigners for Andry Rajoelina near Antsirabe, October 2018

In early August 2018, Andry Rajoelina was the first to register his candidacy for the 2018 presidential elections. He had previously introduced the Initiative for the Emergence of Madagascar (IEM) that define the lines of his campaign program. One campaign promise is to close the Senate to save money and build universities instead. He also aims to increase access to electricity, to work towards agricultural self-sufficiency, and to increase security.

The campaign started in October 2018, with Andry Rajoelina facing as opponents the former presidents Ravalomanana and Rajaonarimampianina, the favorites in a campaign of 46 candidates. In the first round of the elections on 7 November, he took the lead with 39.19% (1,949,851) of the votes (Ravalomana 35.29% or 1,755,855 votes). A televised debate between the two final candidates was aired live on 10 December.

Arena Rajoelina's speech during his father Andry Rajoelina’s announcement of candidacy in 2018

Rajoelina won the election on 19 December 2018 with 55.66% of the votes and was inaugurated on 19 January 2019.

== President of Madagascar (2019–2023; 2023–2025) ==
=== First elected term (2019–2023) ===
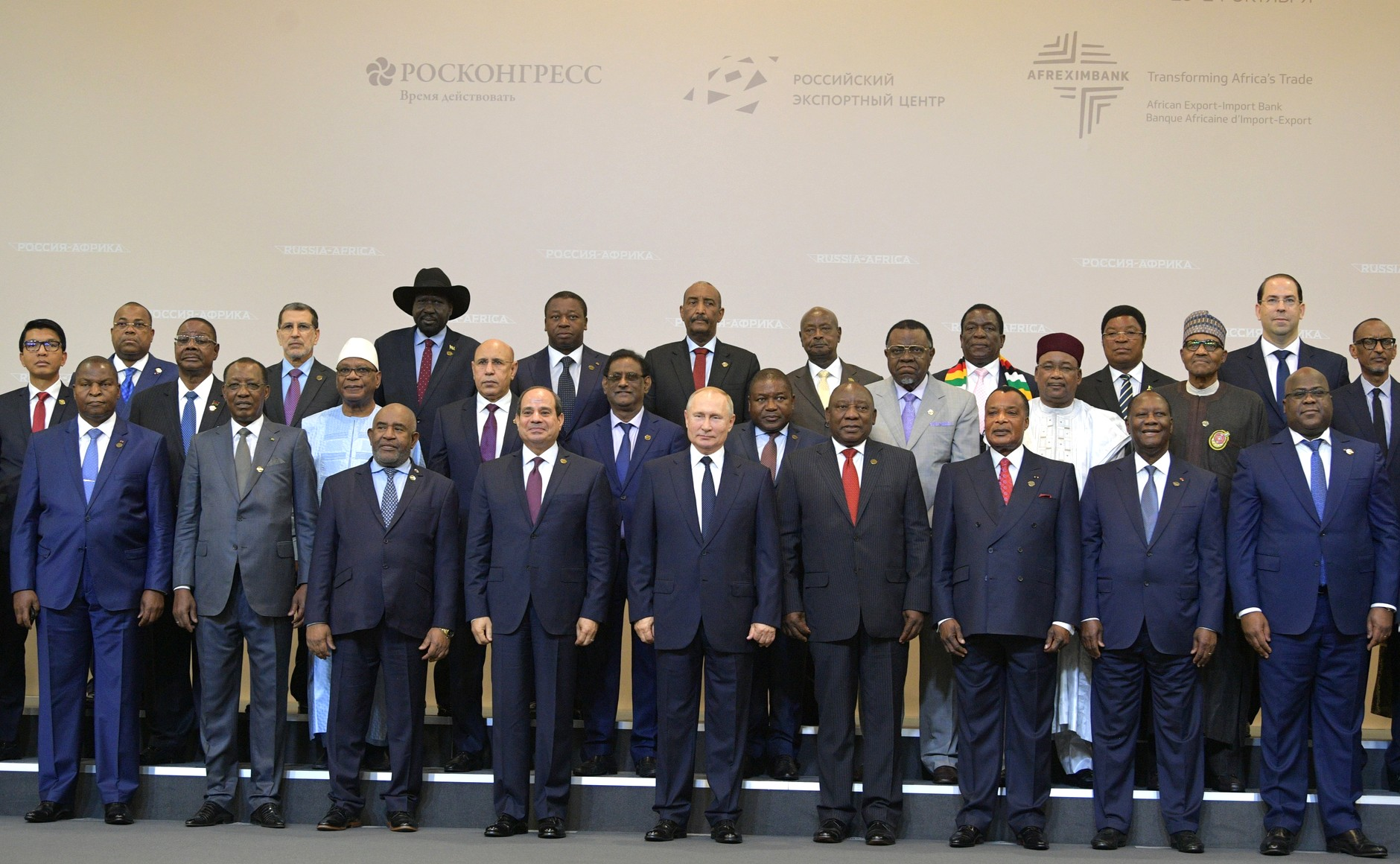
Rajoelina (far left) and other African leaders at the Russia–Africa Summit in Sochi in October 2019

==== COVID-19 pandemic ====
In April and May 2020, President Rajoelina gained international media attention when he launched an untested COVID-19 "cure" dubbed "Covid-Organics". The herbal tea was developed by the Madagascar Institute of Applied Research (MIAR) using artemisia and other locally sourced herbs. The military distributed batches of "Covid-Organics" to the public. Drinking the herbal tea was made obligatory in school. Several African countries including Tanzania, Liberia, Equatorial Guinea, and Guinea-Bissau purchased the herbal tea. Matshidiso Moeti of the Africa regional office of the World Health Organization (WHO) said there was no available proof for the effectiveness of this cure. It had not undergone proper clinical trials and no peer-reviewed data existed. The National Academy of Medicine of Madagascar (ANAMEM) was also skeptical. A WHO advert on Google said: "Africans deserve to use medicines tested to the same standards as people in the rest of the world". The African Union has sought to test the technical efficiency of the herbal tea.

On 4 April, Arphine Helisoa (the pseudonym of Arphine Rahelisoa), a publishing director and journalist at the Ny Valosoa newspaper, was placed in custody awaiting trial charged with "incitement of hatred" towards President Rajoelina and spreading fake news after she was accused of criticizing the president's handling of the pandemic. She was released after a month.

==== Environment ====
Rajoelina has blamed climate change for the food insecurity in parts of his country and has called on powerful nations to fight it.

During the COP26 meeting in Glasgow, Rajoelina vowed to protect the biodiversity of Madagascar's forests from the threat of deforestation, while also announcing the use of bioethanol and gas-based stoves in the country to fight the effects of climate change. Rajoelina also pledged more financial aid to protect the aforementioned biodiversity in Madagascar; which represents 5% of the world.

==== Famine ====
In June 2021, a severe drought struck Madagascar, causing hundreds of thousands of people, with some estimations claiming more than one million, to suffer from food insecurity in the country's southern regions. Rajoelina jointly announced a plan to combat hunger along with US ambassador to the country Michael Pelletier. Among other measures, Rajoelina ordered the distribution of butane gas stoves to replace charcoal as an alternative for people in the poorest areas of the country. The measure reached a total of 15,000 households.

As of July 2025, the food insecurity among Malagasy people had spread and worsened, partly due to an ongoing and intense drought.

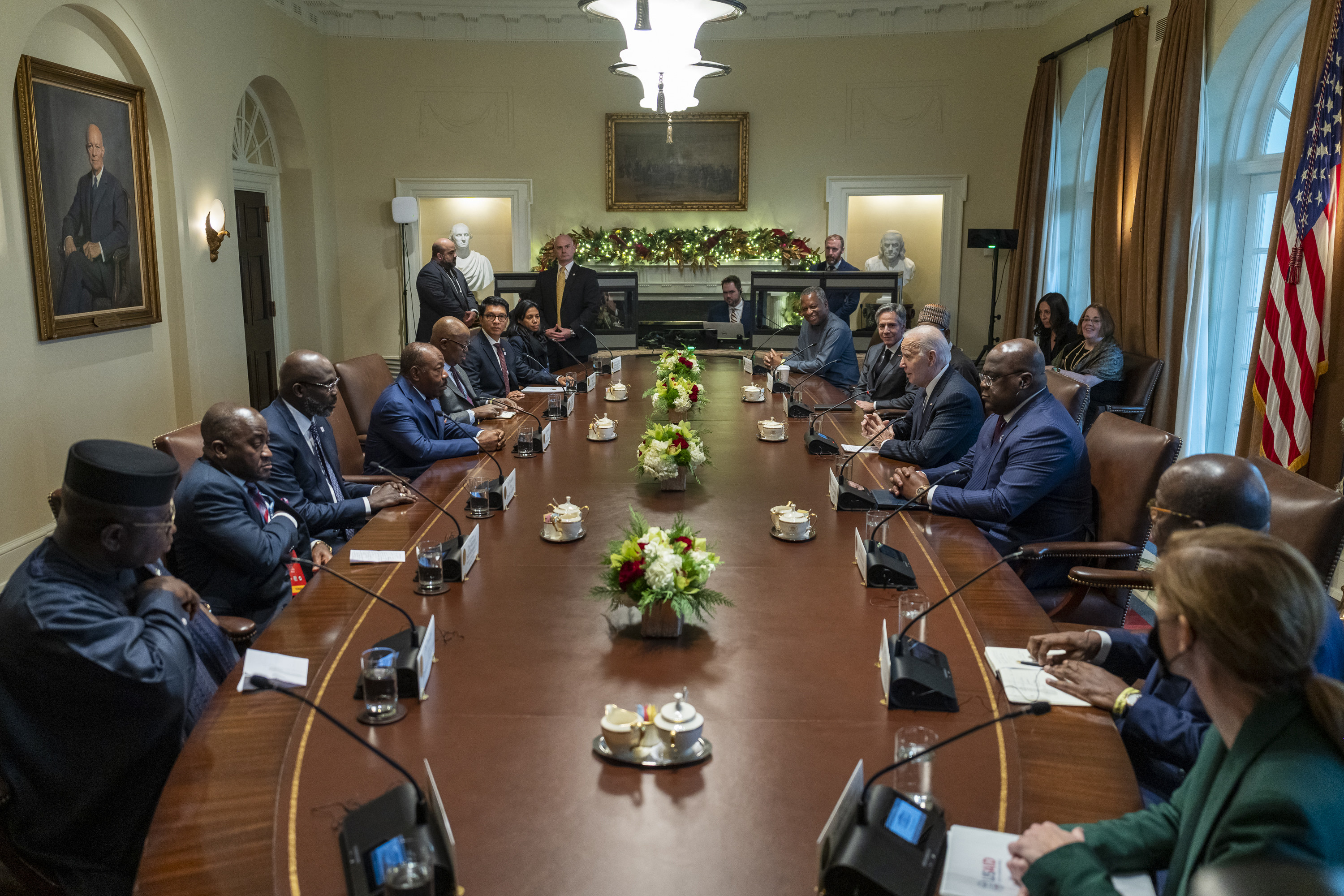
Rajoelina at the United States–Africa Leaders Summit in Washington, D.C. in December 2022

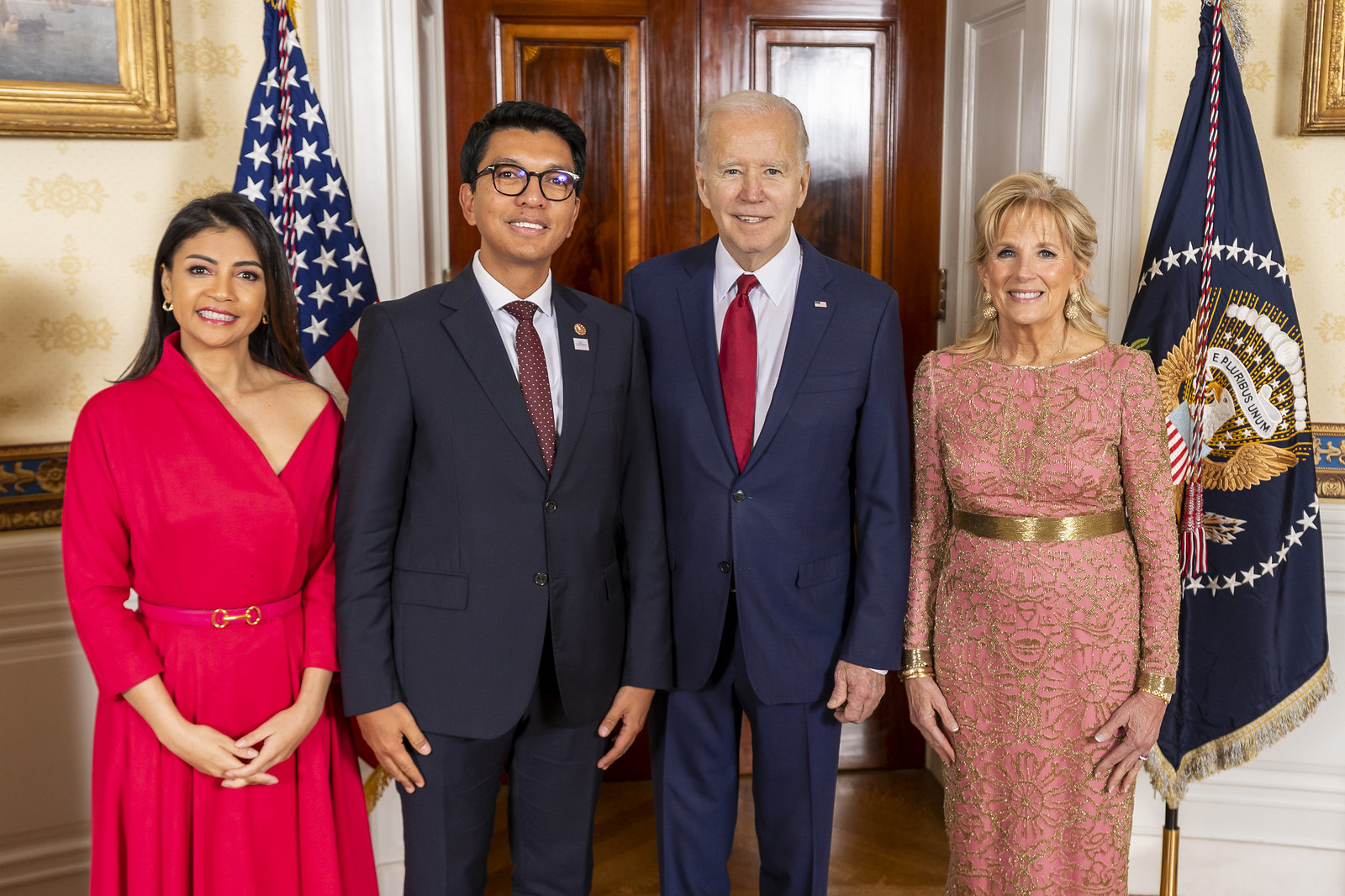
Rajoelina and his wife with US President Joe Biden

==== 2021 assassination plot ====
On 22 July 2021, police announced they had arrested six people, including foreign nationals, after months of investigation into a plot to kill Rajoelina. The attorney general filed charges against them on different charges. The next day, the attorney general announced that at least one French citizen was among those arrested, and said that he was a former member of the French Armed Forces. France responded by saying that they were working with consular aid in Madagascar.

==== French nationality ====
In July 2023, the former president of the Syndicate of Magistrates of Madagascar and opponent Fanirisoa Ernaivo claimed that Rajoelina was a naturalized French citizen and therefore has invalidated his Malagasy citizenship, and has "filed a complaint for treason, espionage, use of forgery and attack on the security of the State".

In June 2023, the revelation of his acquisition of French nationality in 2014 led to the opening of a parliamentary inquiry, followed by the questioning of the High Constitutional Court by a group of citizens of the Malagasy diaspora in France. Under Malagasy law, this may have disqualified him from the presidency, as the country imposes a loss of citizenship if voluntarily acquiring another nationality, and only allows citizens of Madagascar to hold the Presidency. Rajoelina argued that he automatically acquired the French nationality through his father, thus not making him lose his Malagasy one. The Constitutional Court eventually sided with him, pointing out the lack of a decree removing his nationality.

=== Second elected term (2023–2025) ===
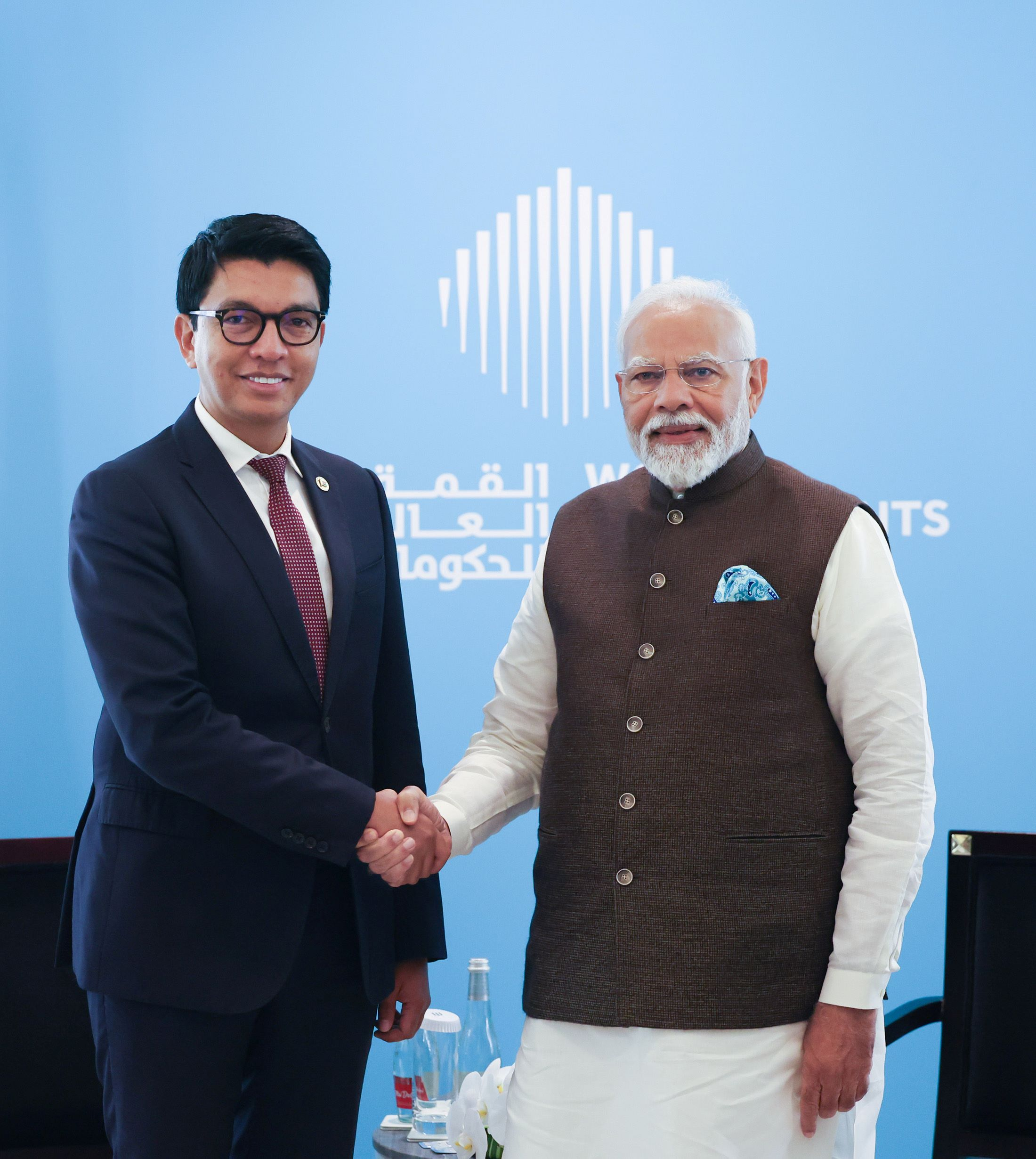
Rajoelina with Indian Prime Minister Narendra Modi in Abu Dhabi on 14 February 2024

Rajoelina took the oath of office on 16 December 2023 for his second term as president of Madagascar amid a boycott by opposition parties that challenged the 16 November election results. In May 2025, Andry Rajoelina reaffirmed his intention to visit the Scattered Islands himself, French islands bordering Malagasy waters, while favoring the path of dialogue to resolve this dispute of several decades, after the European imperial era, in Africa.

==== Base Toliara project ====
Base Toliara, also known as the Toliara Project, is a mining project located north of the city of Toliara in southwestern Madagascar. It aims to extract mineral sands containing mainly ilmenite, zircon and rutile, as well as potentially monazite, which is rich in rare earth elements. Initiated in the late 2010s, the Malagasy government officially suspended the project in 2019, citing local opposition and the need to reassess its economic and environmental impacts. In October 2024, the American company Energy & Fuels acquired the project. A few weeks later, on 28 November 2024, the Malagasy government lifted the suspension, authorizing the resumption of administrative and technical procedures. President Andry Rajoelina has repeatedly expressed his support for the project, which is expected to stimulate the national economy.

Criticism and controversy surrounding the Base Toliara project are numerous and ongoing. Major concerns include environmental impacts, particularly the destruction of sensitive ecosystems and the degradation of the Ranobe area, which is rich in biodiversity. Local communities, especially the Mikea, also denounce risks to their land, livelihoods and way of life, with some fearing forced displacement. The potential extraction of monazite, an ore containing radioactive elements, raises strong concerns regarding safety and waste management. Finally, a 2020 public audit highlighted administrative irregularities in the granting of permits and environmental authorizations, fueling criticism of the project's transparency.

==== Antananarivo cable car ====
Under his presidency, the Antananarivo cable car has become one of the flagship projects of his infrastructure modernization policy. Partially inaugurated in August 2024, the "orange line" connects Anosy to Ambatobe, in the capital over a distance of approximately 8.6 km with 7 stations and 198 cabins, and aims to carry between 40,000 and 60,000 passengers per day. Presented as an ecological initiative to combat traffic congestion, this project, worth over €150 million, is financed by a loan from the French Treasury and another guaranteed by Bpifrance, the public investment bank.

However, the project has attracted criticism: it is noted that the ticket price makes it inaccessible for a large part of the population, in a country where access to electricity remains unstable and resources are limited. Others point to a possible gap between presidential ambitions and the daily reality of citizens, particularly in terms of social priorities (access to clean water, electricity, housing) and long-term maintenance capacity. Its supposedly sustainable operation is also called into question; the cable car consumed 100 and 150 liters of diesel per hour, which would generate nearly 720 tons of CO₂ per month. Its impact on traffic jams remains very limited for the moment, calling into question the relevance of this mode of transport to resolve the chronic traffic jams in the capital.

==== 2025 Malagasy protests, escape from office, and impeachment ====
In September 2025, widespread protests erupted against frequent water and power cuts. They were systematically repressed, causing the deaths of over 20 people and leaving hundreds injured. In response, Rajoelina sacked Prime Minister Christian Ntsay on 29 September 2025. He said, without providing evidence, that some politicians were plotting to take advantage of the protests and had considered staging a coup while he was addressing the United Nations.

On 12 October, Rajoelina's office said that an attempt to topple his government was underway; a statement said the situation was under control. However, on 13 October, an opposition lawmaker reported that Rajoelina had fled the country. Reports suggest that Rajoelina and his family first left the capital for Sainte-Marie island by helicopter, before being exfiltrated by a French Air Force CASA CN-235 to Réunion. From Reunion Rajoelina boarded a private jet, operated by Vistajet, which took him to Dubai, where he arrived next day.

Rajoelina addressed the nation later that day, saying that he fled "in fear for his life" but remained defiant, saying that he "would not allow Madagascar to be destroyed" and refusing to step down. The speech was broadcast on the presidency's official Facebook page but not on national television. Rajoelina later confirmed that he had left the country sometime between 11 and 12 October after "explicit and extremely serious threats" were made to his life while he was due to travel abroad for a mission.

On 14 October 2025, Rajoelina issued a decree dissolving the National Assembly, again without disclosing his location, and reaffirming that he is still in charge of the government. Later that day, the National Assembly defied the decree and voted to impeach Rajoelina by 130 votes to one blank, as the military said that they have seized power. On 25 October, the new government revoked Rajoelina's Malagasy citizenship, citing laws against dual nationality.

== Controversies ==
=== Relationship with Mamy Ravatomanga ===
Madagascan businessman Mamy Ravatomanga has consistently been portrayed as one of the closest figures to Andry Rajoelina since the latter entered politics. According to Africa Intelligence, the two men grew closer in 2008, when their respective companies were subjected to tax audits initiated under the presidency of Marc Ravalomanana. Ravatomanga subsequently supported Rajoelina’s rise to power during the 2009 coup d'état and became one of his unofficial advisor, particularly on economic matters. Ranked as the second-wealthiest person in Madagascar in 2017 by Forbes, he has since been frequently named in the press in connection with various political-financial scandals and investigations into financial crime in Madagascar, Mauritius and France.

Although he holds no official position within the presidency, he is often described as Andry Rajoelina’s main financial support; he stands accused of contributing to state capture, exerting significant influence over administrative appointments and decisions, and leveraging public institutions to serve his own interests.

During the 2025 protests, Mamy Ravatomanga was frequently singled out by demonstrators, who denounced his influence over the Madagascan economy and political landscape and demanded that he face trial.

On October 12, 2025, as the regime faced a situation where part of the army was defecting to join the protesters, he left Madagascar—accompanied by former Prime Minister Christian Ntsay—aboard a plane from his own company and traveled to Mauritius. He was initially placed under surveillance upon his arrival and subsequently arrested as part of an investigation into embezzlement and money laundering · .

=== Arrest of the Director of Cabinet ===
On 14 August 2023, the Director of Cabinet of President Andry Rajoelina, Romy Voos Andrianarisoa, was arrested in London under accusations of corruption on a London-based mining company. She was dismissed by Rajoelina on 16 August 2023.

=== Predator Files ===
In October 2023, the newspaper Mediapart revealed that the Malagasy presidency acquired the Predator spyware in 2021. An investigation by the Central Office for the Fight against Crimes Against Humanity, Genocides and War Crimes (OCLCH) established that the leaders of Nexa and Intellexa exported to the Malagasy presidency, without any authorization, hardware and software allowing hacking of phones. Which can be considered as an "illicit transaction, carried out in the absence of contract [and] authorization".

The spyware was acquired with the aim of "fighting corruption" but the hacking operations were used to spy on several political opponents, including the opposition journalist, Roland Rasoamaharo who was subsequently imprisoned. Other arrests took place after the use of the spyware. According to two technical investigations, Predator was also used by the Malagasy government during the 2023 elections.

=== The Iranian Boeing 777-200 Affair ===
In July 2025, five Boeing 777-200 aircraft were located in Iran—a country subject to international sanctions. It was later revealed that these planes were acquired by the Iranian airline Mahan Air, originate from various Southeast Asian countries, and had initially been provisionally registered in Madagascar, before to circumvent those sanctions.

On August 24, 2025, following an investigation by the Anti-Corruption Unit, 22 individuals were placed in pre-trial detention on charges including corruption, abuse of office, forgery of public documents, criminal conspiracy and harboring criminals, usurpation of titles, and endangering the internal security of the State; the Minister of Transport, Valéry Ramonjavelo, was dismissed from his post on August 29. Prominent figures such as Mamy Ravatomanga and Richard Ravalomanana were suspected of involvement in the operation. The case took on an international dimension with the involvement of the FBI, Interpol, and ICAO, all of which were called upon to support the investigation.

== Honours ==
=== National ===
- Grand Cordon of the National Order of Madagascar (2019)
- Grand Cross 1st Class of the National Order of Madagascar (2009)

=== Foreign honours ===
- Guinea Bissau:
  - Recipient of the Medal of Amílcar Cabral (2024)

=== Other awards ===
- 2000: Entrepreneur of the Year by the magazine Écho Australe which named then-mayor of Antananarivo Marc Ravalomanana their Entrepreneur of the Year in 1999, bestowed the same honor on Rajoelina in 2000.
- 2003: Best young entrepreneur in Madagascar by French bank BNI Crédit Lyonnais

== Notes ==
Political offices
| Preceded by Hyppolite Ramaroson as Head of the Military Directorate | President of the High Transitional Authority of Madagascar; 2009–2014 | Succeeded by Hery Rajaonarimampianina as President of Madagascar |
| Preceded by Rivo Rakotovao (acting) | President of Madagascar; 2019–2023 | Succeeded by Christian Ntsay (acting) |
| Preceded by Richard Ravalomanana (acting) | President of Madagascar; 2023–2025 | Succeeded by Michael Randrianirina as Interim President of Madagascar |
