= Senate (Madagascar) =

Upper chamber of the Parliament of Madagascar

Senate Antenimierandoholona

Type
- Type: Upper house

History
- Founded: 1958–1975 (first senate), 1993–2025 (second senate)

Leadership
- President: Vacant since 14 October 2025 (Suspended)

Structure
- Seats: 18
- Political groups: Vacant (18)
- Length of term: 5 years

Website
- www.senat.mg/

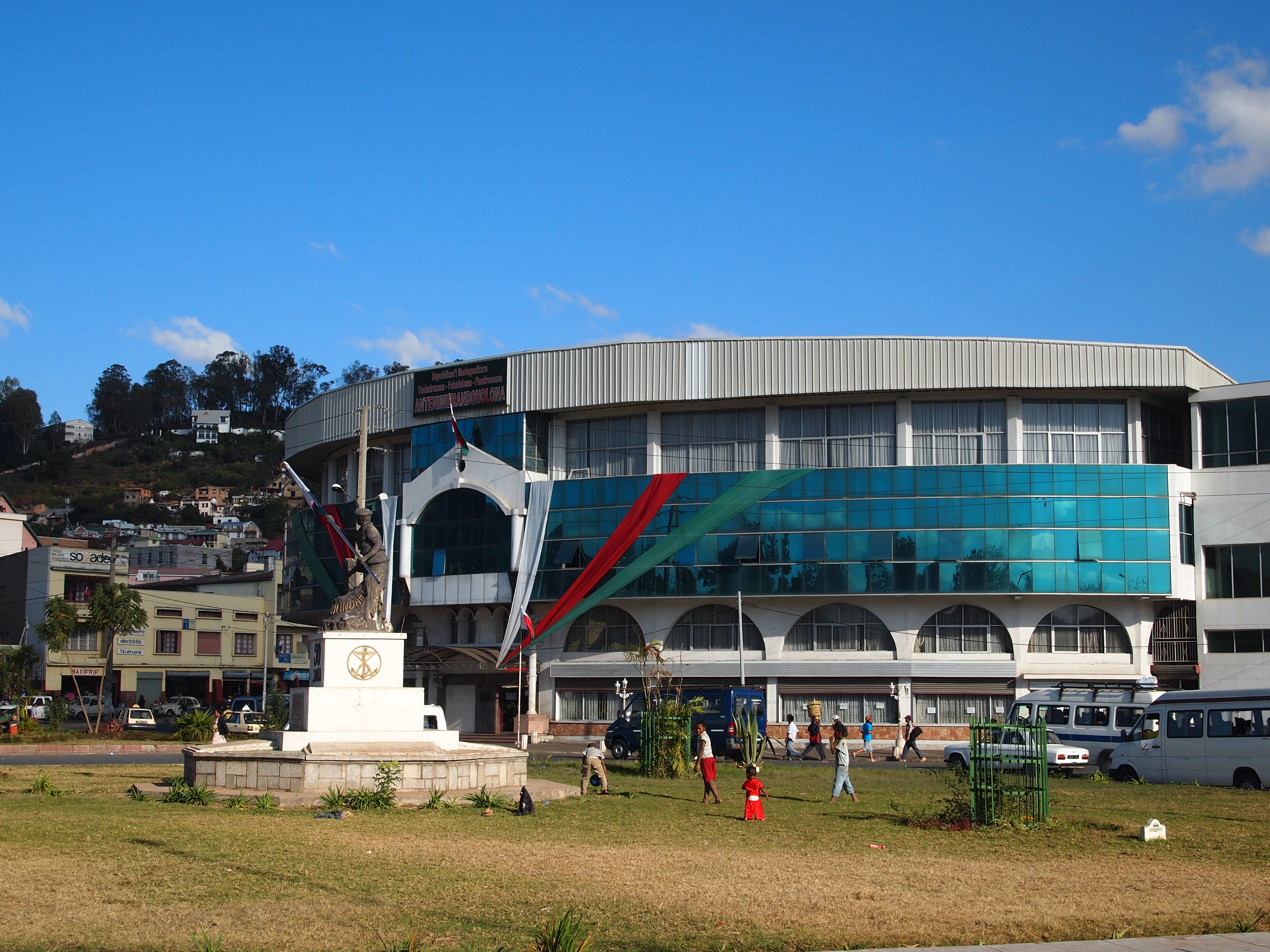
The Madagascar Senate convenes in a building near the Anosy and Mahamasina neighborhoods of Antananarivo.

The Senate (Malagasy: Antenimierandoholona; French: Sénat) is the upper chamber of the bicameral Parliament of Madagascar. The Senate has 18 members: 12 are indirectly elected, two from each of the six provinces of Madagascar, and 6 are appointed by the President. The President of the Senate is the legal successor to the President of the Republic in the event of a vacancy in the latter position.

Following the 2025 coup d'état, the transitional government has suspended the Senate and the future of the chamber is unclear.

== Legislative history ==
The Senate existed under the First Republic (1958–1975) and was a weaker body than the National Assembly, the lower house of Parliament. Only the National Assembly could vote on a motion of censure against the government. Two-thirds of the First Republic Senators were elected by provincial and municipal bodies, serving six-year terms (with half of the seats up for election every three years), while the other one-third were appointed by the government.

Under the Second Republic (1975–1993), the Senate was abolished, leaving the National Assembly as a unicameral parliament. Under the Third Republic (1993–present), the Senate was restored only after the term of Albert Zafy (1993-1997), with two-thirds of the Senators being indirectly elected and the other one-third being appointed by the President. As was the case during the First Republic, it cannot vote to censure the government, but it also cannot be dissolved.

Prior to the Senate election held on April 20, 2008, at which time the reduction to 33 members took effect, the Senate had 90 members. Sixty Senators, 10 for each province, were elected by provincial electors, while the other thirty Senators were appointed by the President. In the April 2008 Senate election, the ruling Tiako i Madagasikara (TIM) party won all 22 of the elected seats. The President of TIM, Yvan Randriasandratriniony, was elected as President of the Senate on May 6, 2008; previously, Rajemison Rakotomaharo was President of the Senate from 2002 to 2008.

In March 2009 interim-president Andry Rajoelina dissolved both Houses of Parliament.

On 29 December 2015 elections were held for the Senate, 42 senators were elected by mayors and councillors. These were the first elections since the dissolving of the Senate in 2009. On 1 February 2016 the remaining 21 senators were appointed by President Hery Rajaonarimampianina. In 2019, the number was reduced from 33 to 18, in accordance with a decree of President Andry Rajoelina.

After the 2025 Malagasy coup d'état, interim President Michael Randrianirina announced the dissolution of the Senate.

== Current members ==
- Bin Soufou Alidy
- Hajaniaina Tahina Andrianandrasana
- Erick Lambert Besoa
- Eddie Serge Fernand
- Hugues Laurent Guy Mahonjo
- Jean André Ndremanjary
- Jean Paul Nicolas Rabemananjara
- Willy Sylvain Rabetsaroana
- Sidonie Raharinirina
- Neypatraiky André Rakotomamonjy
- Andrianantenaina Michel Rakotondrainibe
- Lalatiana Rakotondrazafy
- Emiline Ramaroa
- Richard Ravalomanana
- Raymond Rasolondratsimba
- Avizara Mino Seramila
- Dinaraly Odilon Tiandaza
- Mahaleo Richard Victor Tsiebo

== See also ==
- List of presidents of the Senate of Madagascar
