= List of political parties in Madagascar =

This article lists political parties in Madagascar.

In Madagascar, most of the constituencies elect one member of the national assembly; however, several elect two. This means that the political party with most votes may get an absolute majority in the national assembly without an absolute majority of the votes. This system makes coalition governments less likely.

== Parties ==
=== Parliamentary parties ===
Party	Abbr.	Ideology	MPs
Young Malagasies Determined; Tanora Malagasy Vonona	TGV	Reformism; Pro-Rajoelina	84 / 151
I Love Madagascar; Tiako I Madagasikara	TIM	Nationalism; Populism; Economic liberalism	11 / 151
Groupe Parlementaire uni pour la République (GPR); Groupe Parlementaire uni pour la République	GPR	Centrism; Liberalism	18 / 151
Malagasy Tia Tanindrazana	MA.TI.TA		1 / 151
Malagasy Tonga Saina	MTS		1 / 151
Group of Young Malagasy Patriots; Groupe des jeunes malgaches patriotes	GJMP		1 / 151
Movement for Democracy in Madagascar; Mouvement pour la démocratie à Madagascar	MDM		1 / 151
RPSD Vaovao	RPSD	Social democracy	1 / 151

=== Other parties ===
Party	Abbreviation	Ideology	Notes
Association for the Rebirth of Madagascar; Andry sy Rihana Enti-Manavotra an'i Madagasikara	AREMA	Left-wing nationalism	Ruling party during the Democratic Republic of Madagascar.
AMM - Avotantsika Miaraka i Madagasikara	AMM		created May 2023
Congress Party for the Independence of Madagascar; Parti du Congrès de l'indépendance de Madagascar	AKFM	Communism; Marxism	Affiliated with AREMA.
APM - Antoko Politika Madio	APM		
FTT - Firaisankinan’ny Tia Tanindrazana	FTT		party of Tahina Razafinjoelina
Judged by Your Work Party; Asa Vita no Ifampitsarana, Akaiky ny Vahoaka Indrindra	AVI	Centrism	—N/a
Hery Vaovao ho an'i Madagasikara	HVM		former president's Hery Rajaonarimampianina party
Economic Liberalism and Democratic Action for National Recovery; Libéralisme économique et action démocratique pour la reconstruction nationale	LEADER-Fanilo	Economic liberalism Liberal democracy	—N/a
Manaovasoa; Manaovasoa	Manaovasoa	—N/a	Formed by a former AKFM leader.
Movement for the Progress of Madagascar; Mpitolona ho an'ny Fandrosoan'i Madagasikara	MFM	Liberalism	Former socialistic party.
Madagascar for the Malagasy; Madagasikara otronin'ny Malagasy	MONIMA	Malagasy nationalism	—N/a
Rebirth of the Social Democratic Party; Rénaissance du Parti Social-Démocratique	RPSD	Social democracy	—N/a
Fampandrosoana Mirindra; Fampandrosoana Mirindra	—N/a	—N/a	—N/a
Fanjava Velogno; Fanjava Velogno	—N/a	—N/a	—N/a
Fihavanantsika; Fihavanantsika	—N/a	—N/a	—N/a
Isandra Mivoatsa; Isandra Mivoatsa	—N/a	—N/a	—N/a
Liaraike; Liaraike	—N/a	—N/a	—N/a
Mayors' Association; Association de Maires	AM	—N/a	—N/a
MMM - Malagasy Miara-Miainga	MMM	Centrism	Member of Centrist Democrat International
National Wisa Association; Association Nationale Wisa	ANW	—N/a	—N/a
Our Madagascar	—N/a	—N/a	—N/a
Union	—N/a	—N/a	—N/a
Vohibato Tapa-kevitsa; Vohibato Tapa-kevitsa	VTK	—N/a	—N/a
Party Where the People Are the Priority; Antoko ny Vahoaka Aloha No Andrianina	AVANA	Centrism	—N/a
Madagascar Green Party; Antoko Maitso Hasin’i Madagasikara	AMHM	Green politics Political ecology	—N/a
National Unity, Freedom & Development; Fahalalahana sy ny Fampandrosoana	FFF	—N/a	—N/a
Party With Us; Parti Hiaraka Isika	PHI	—N/a	—N/a
Pillar of Madagascar andri-Madagasikara	AIM	—N/a	—N/a
Social Democratic Party of Madagascar; Parti social démocrate de Madagascar et des Comores	PSD	Social democracy Democratic socialism Social-ecology	Originally supported continued links with France.
TT - Tsara Tahafina	TT	—N/a	founded 2021 by Auguste Paraina
VPHM - Vondrona Politika hafa Miray	VPHM	—N/a	Filling its own pockets
Political-based Groups Working Together; Vondrona Politika Miara dia Malagasy Miara Miainga	VPM-MMM	—N/a	—N/a

=== Former parties ===
Party	Ideology	Notes	
Democratic Movement for Malagasy Rejuvenation; Mouvement démocratique de la rénovation malgache	Anti-colonialism; Malagasy nationalism	Colonial-era nationalist party.	
National Union; Firaisankinam-Pirenena	Big tent	Alliance of TIM, AVI and RPSD.	
Party of the Disinherited of Madagascar; Parti des déshérités de Madagascar	Anti-colonialism; Malagasy nationalism	Party of Madagascar's first president.	
Communist Party (French Section of the Communist International) of the Region of Madagascar; Parti communiste (section francaise de l'Internationale communiste) de la Region du Madagascar	Communism; Marxism-Leninism	Colonial-era malagasy section of the French Communist Party.	
Malagasy Communist Party; Parti Communiste Malgache	Communism; Marxism-Leninism	Supported China after the Sino-Soviet split.	
Brun-Ly; Brun-Ly	—N/a	personal movement of Bruno Rajaonson	—N/a

== See also ==
- Politics of Madagascar
- List of political parties by country
- Malagasy Communist Party
