= Ntsay government =

Ministerial cabinet of Madagascar (2018–2025)

- Cabinet of Madagascar
- 2018–2025
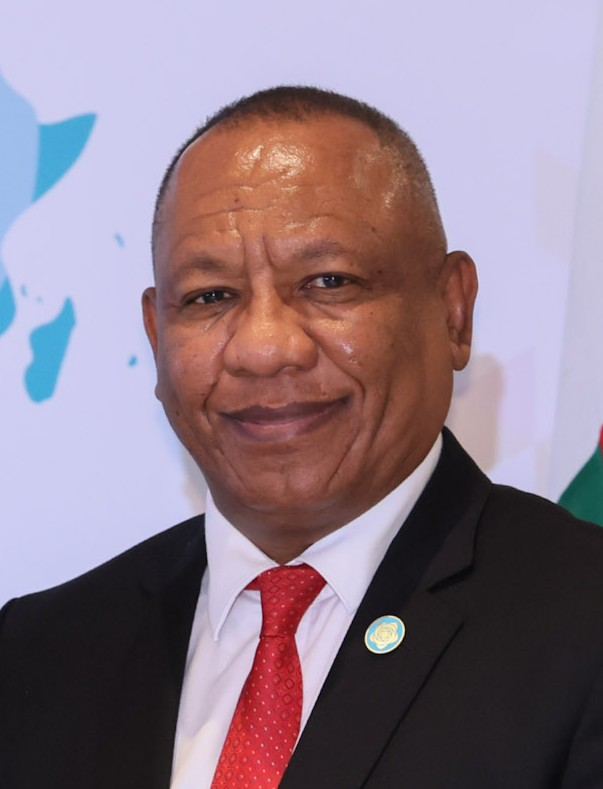
- Ntsay in 2025
- Date formed: 4 June 2018
- Date dissolved: 30 September 2025

People and organisations
- President: Hery Rajaonarimampianina (until 7 September 2018); Andry Rajoelina (until 9 September 2023); Ntsay government (acting, until 27 October 2023); Richard Ravalomanana (acting, from 27 October 2023)
- Prime Minister: Christian Ntsay
- Member party: Young Malagasies Determined
- Status in legislature: Majority government 84 / 151
- Opposition party: Tiako I Madagasikara; MA.TI.TA; Malagasy Tonga Saina; Group of Young Malagasy Patriots; Movement for Democracy in Madagascar; RPSD Vaovao

History
- Elections: 2019 parliamentary election; 2024 parliamentary election
- Predecessor: Solonandrasana government
- Successor: Zafisambo government

The Ntsay government governed Madagascar from 4 June 2018 to 30 September 2025. It was formed by Prime Minister Christian Ntsay. After incumbent president Andry Rajoelina resigned to run for the presidency in 2023, according to the Constitution, the Council of Ministers led by Ntsay temporarily exercised presidential authority. The Ntsay government was dissolved by President Rajoelina in September 2025 following nationwide protests.

== Ministers ==
- Minister of National Defence: General of the Army Béni Xavier Rasolofonirina
- Minister of Foreign Affairs: Eloi Alphonse Maxime Dovo
- Keeper of the Seals, Minister of Justice: Mrs. Noro Vololona
- Minister of Finance and Budget: Ms. Sehenosoa Andriambololona
- Minister of the Interior and Decentralization: Tianarivelo Razafimahefa
- Minister of Public Security: Érick Michel Wouli Soumah Idrissa
- Minister of Economy and Planning: Marcel Arsonaivo Napetoke
- Minister of Territorial Development and Land Services: Ms. Christine Razanamahasoa
- Minister of Agriculture and Livestock and Fisheries: Harison Edmond Randriarimanana
- Minister of Mines and Petroleum: Henry Rabary-Njaka
- Minister of Fishery Resources and Fisheries: Augustin Andriamananoro
- Minister of Industry and Private Sector Development: Guy Rivo Randrianarisoa
- Minister of Commerce and Consumer Affairs: Mrs. Yvette Sylla
- Minister of Public Works and Infrastructure: Jacques Ulrich Andriantiana
- Minister of Transport and Meteorology: Beboarimisa Ralava
- Minister of Energy and Hydrocarbons: Lantoniaina Rasoloelison
- Minister of Public Health: Harinirina Yoël Honora Rantomalala
- Minister of National Education: Gatien Horace
- Minister of Public Service, Administration Reform, Labour, Employment and Social Laws: Holder Ramaholimasy
- Minister of Higher Education and Scientific Research: Mrs. Marie-Monique Rasoazananera
- Minister of Technical Education and Vocational Training: Ms. Lydia Aimée Vololona Rahantasoa
- Minister of Tourism: Jean Brunelle Razafintsiandraofa
- Minister of Water, Sanitation and Hygiene: Roland Ravatomanga
- Minister of the Environment, Ecology and Forests: Guillaume Venance Randriatefiarison
- Minister of Culture, Promotion of Handicrafts and Protection of Heritage: Ms. Eléonore Johasy
- Minister of Posts, Telecommunications and Digital Development: Jean de Dieu Maharante
- Minister of Communication and Relations with Institutions: Riana Andriamandavy VII
- Minister of Population, Social Protection and Promotion of Women: Mrs. Irmah Naharimamy
- Minister of Youth and Sports: Tsihoara Faratiana Eugène
- Secretary of State at the Ministry of National Defence in charge of the Gendarmerie: Major General Jean Christophe Randriamanarina, Serge Gellé

== See also ==
- Cabinet of Madagascar
