= Mamisoa Rakotomandimbindraibe =

Malagasy politician

Mamisoa Rakotomandimbindraibe is a Malagasy politician. She was a member of the National Assembly of Madagascar, he was elected as a member of the Tiako I Madagasikara party the 2002 and 2007 Malagasy parliamentary elections. She represents the constituency of Ambatolampy.

In 2014 she defeated her seat.

She had been a political prisoner after the putsch led by Andry Rajoelina in 2009.

She had been a candidat in the 2019 Malagasy parliamentary elections also, but lost her seat with 11,45% of the votes.
