= Ramilison Randriamampianina =

Malagasy politician

Ramilison Randriamampianina is a Malagasy politician. A member of the National Assembly of Madagascar, he was elected as a member of the Tiako I Madagasikara party. He was elected deputy in the 2002 Malagasy parliamentary elections, 2007 and 2013 He was also a candidat in 2019 but failed with 12,82% of votes. He represents the constituency of Antanifotsy.
