= Brigitte Lalanirina =

Malagasy politician

Brigitte Lalanirina is a Malagasy politician. She was a member of the National Assembly of Madagascar, she was elected as a member of the Tiako I Madagasikara party in the 2002 Malagasy parliamentary elections and 2007. She represented the constituency of Ikongo.

She lost the 2019 Malagasy parliamentary elections with 18,79% of the votes.
