= Parson Zazaharivelo Rakotovazaha =

Malagasy politician

Parson Zazaharivelo Rakotovazaha is a Malagasy politician. A member of the National Assembly of Madagascar, he was elected in the 2007 Malagasy parliamentary elections for the Mayors' Association party; he represents the constituency of Mampikony.

In the 2019 Malagasy parliamentary elections he was the supplementary candidat for the same constituency for the candidate of Tiako I Madagasikara party candidat Alain Claude Rasolofondratratra.
