= Francis Tamisy Raharison =

Malagasy politician

Francis Tamisy Raharison is a Malagasy politician. A former member of the National Assembly of Madagascar, he was elected as a deputy of the Tiako I Madagasikara party in the 2002 Malagasy parliamentary elections and in 2007. He represents the constituency of Anosibe An'ala.
