= Raharimampionona =

Malagasy politician

Raharimampionona is a Malagasy politician. A member of the National Assembly of Madagascar, she was elected as a member of the Tiako I Madagasikara party; she represents the constituency of Ikalamavony during the 2007 Malagasy parliamentary elections. She was reelected in 2013 and 2019 as an independent candidate.
