= André Baozandrivelo =

Malagasy politician

André Baozandrivelo is a Malagasy politician. A member of the National Assembly of Madagascar, he was elected as a member of the Tiako I Madagasikara party in the 2007 Malagasy parliamentary elections. He represents the constituency of Vondrozo.

He had filed for the 2019 Malagasy parliamentary elections also but his candidature was denied due to his condamnation in 1997.
