= Léon Rasalama =

Malagasy politician

Léon Rasalama is a Malagasy politician and president of the basketball club SEBAM from Mahajanga. A member of the National Assembly of Madagascar, he was elected as a member of the Tiako I Madagasikara party; he represents the second constituency of Mahajanga II (district).

He was reelected in the 2019 Malagasy parliamentary elections being affiliated to IRD. He is the president of the Commission of Public Works.

In 2010 three trucks owned by Rasalama with illegally cut rosewood were seized in Mahajanga.
