= Maolidy =

Malagasy politician

Maolidy is a Malagasy politician. A member of the National Assembly of Madagascar, he was elected in the 2002 Malagasy parliamentary election for Boeni Mandroso and in the 2007 Malagasy parliamentary election for the Tiako I Madagasikara party; he represents the constituency of Soalala.
