= Mamy Tiana Télésphore Gérard Ravelonanosy =

Malagasy politician

Mamy Tiana Télésphore Gérard Ravelonanosy is a Malagasy politician. A member of the National Assembly of Madagascar, he was elected as a member of the Tiako I Madagasikara party in the 2007 Malagasy parliamentary elections. He was reelected in 2014 but lost his seat as a deputy in 2019. He represents the constituency of Ankazobe.
