= Hubert Rakotoson =

Malagasy politician

Member of the National Assembly of Madagascar
- Incumbent
- Assumed office 2007
- Constituency: Mahanoro
- Incumbent
- Assumed office 2019

Personal details
- Party: Tiako I Madagasikara (2007); IRD (2019–)
- Nickname: Salo

Hubert Rakotoson (nicknamed Salo) is a Malagasy politician. A member of the National Assembly of Madagascar, he was elected as a member of the Tiako I Madagasikara party in the 2007 Malagasy parliamentary elections. He represents the constituency of Mahanoro.

He was reelected in 2019 under the flag of IRD.
