= Edmond Rodin Georges Rakotomanjato =

Malagasy politician

Edmond Rodin Georges Rakotomanjato (66 years, in 2019) is a Malagasy politician. A member of the National Assembly of Madagascar, he was elected as a member of the Tiako I Madagasikara party in the 2007 Malagasy parliamentary elections. He represents the constituency of Arivonimamo.

He was reelected in 2019.
