= Fidson Mananjara =

Malagasy politician

Fidson Mananjara (better known as Rasomotra) is a Malagasy politician. He was member of the National Assembly of Madagascar as a member of the Tiako I Madagasikara party, he represented the constituency of Soanierana Ivongo after the 2007 Malagasy parliamentary elections.

He also was a candidate in the 2019 Malagasy parliamentary elections but only obtained 8.41% of the votes and he was not elected.
