= Manahirana Leriva =

Malagasy politician

Manahirana Leriva is a Malagasy politician. A member of the National Assembly of Madagascar, he was elected as a member of the Tiako I Madagasikara party in the 2002 Malagasy parliamentary elections. He was reelected in 2007. He represents the constituency of Brickaville.
