= Clermont Gervais Mahazaka =

Malagasy politician

Clermont Gervais Mahazaka is a Malagasy politician. A member of the National Assembly of Madagascar, he was elected as a member of the Tiako I Madagasikara party in the 2007 Malagasy parliamentary elections. He represents the constituency of Fénérive Est.

He had been the minister of post and telecommunications until 2004 when he was replaced by Bruno Ramaroson Andriantavison.
