= Joseph Rakotomazava =

Malagasy politician

Joseph Rakotomazava is a Malagasy politician. A member of the National Assembly of Madagascar, he was elected as a member of the Tiako I Madagasikara party in the 2007 Malagasy parliamentary elections. He represents the second constituency of Antananarivo.
