= Zafilaza =

Malagasy politician

Zafilaza is a Malagasy politician. A member of the National Assembly of Madagascar, he was elected as a member of the Tiako I Madagasikara party; he represents the constituency of Mandritsara for the 2007 Malagasy parliamentary elections.

He had been the minister of population, social protection and freetime in 2003.
