= Mouhamed Sebany =

Malagasy politician

Mohamed Sebany is a Malagasy politician. A member of the National Assembly of Madagascar, he was elected as a member of the Tiako I Madagasikara party in the 2007 Malagasy parliamentary elections. He was reelected in the 2013 Malagasy general elections. He represents the constituency of Ambilobe.
