= Tsimisotry Ramanantsoa =

Malagasy politician

Tsimisotry Ramanantsoa is a Malagasy politician. A member of the National Assembly of Madagascar, he was elected as a member of the Tiako I Madagasikara party in the 2007 Malagasy parliamentary elections. He represents the constituency of Morafenobe.

He also was a candidate in the 2013 Malagasy general elections and 2019 Malagasy parliamentary elections but was not elected.
