= Louis Bernard Rakotomanga =

Malagasy politician

Louis Bernard Rakotomanga is a Malagasy politician & TV presenter. A member of the National Assembly of Madagascar, he was elected as a member of the Tiako I Madagasikara party in the 2007 Malagasy parliamentary elections. He represents the fourth constituency of Antananarivo.
