= Jean André Soja =

Malagasy politician

Jean André Soja (called Kaleta, born 13 February 1946 in Behara, deceased 25 July 2024, Antananarivo) was a Malagasy politician. He was a member of the Senate of Madagascar for Anosy. He was elected member of the senate before 2002. He also was a member of the Tiako I Madagasikara and is the founder of Liaraike, his personal party.

He won a seat as senator in the 2001 Malagasy senatorial elections for Anosy and became a member of parliament in the 2002 Malagasy parliamentary elections.

In the 2019 elections Liarlike jointed IRD -- Isika Rehetra Miaraka amin'i Andry Rajoelina of Andry Rajoelina.

He was named Special Councillor of Political Affairs by President Andry Rajoelina on 7 April 2022.
