= Jocelyn Borida =

Malagasy politician

Jocelyn Borida is a Malagasy politician. Borida was elected to the National Assembly of Madagascar as a member of the Tiako I Madagasikara party in the 2007 Malagasy parliamentary elections. He represents the constituency of Belo sur Tsiribihina.
