= Eric Fadola Razafimandimby =

Malagasy politician

Eric Fadola Razafimandimby is a Malagasy politician. A member of the National Assembly of Madagascar, he was elected as a member of the Tiako I Madagasikara party in the 2007 Malagasy parliamentary elections. He represents the constituency of Manja.

He was the former Minister of Public Works and was named embassador of Madagascar to China in 2018.
