= Armand Randrianarison =

Malagasy politician

Armand Randrianarison is a Malagasy politician. He was a member of the National Assembly of Madagascar, he was elected as a member of the Tiako I Madagasikara party in the 2007 Malagasy parliamentary elections. He represented the constituency of Vatomandry in Madagascar.
