= Gaston Rakotobezanahary =

Malagasy politician

Gaston Rakotobezanahary is a Malagasy politician. A member of the National Assembly of Madagascar, he was elected as a member of the Liaraike party; he represents the constituency of Benenitra.

He was again a candidate in the 2019 Malagasy parliamentary elections under the banner of the IRD but was not elected. He obtained 12,95% of the votes.
