= Félix Randriamandimbisoa =

Malagasy politician

Félix Randriamandimbisoa is a Malagasy politician. A member of the National Assembly of Madagascar, he was elected as a member of the Tiako I Madagasikara party; he represents the fourth constituency of Antananarivo at the 2007 Malagasy parliamentary elections.

He won again his seat during the 2014 Malagasy parliamentary elections.
