= Yvonne Bezara =

Malagasy politician

Yvonne Bezara (maiden name: Yvonne Ranorovelo) is a Malagasy politician. A member of the National Assembly of Madagascar, she was elected as a member of the Tiako I Madagasikara party in the 2007 Malagasy parliamentary elections. She represents the second constituency of Toamasina.

She had been the suppleant of Pierrot Botozaza who had been named Minister of Transports.
