= Andrianirina Marie Bruno Rakotoarisoa =

Malagasy politician

Andrianirina Marie Bruno Rakotoarisoa is a Malagasy politician. A member of the National Assembly of Madagascar, he was elected as a member of the Tiako I Madagasikara party. For the first constituency of Fianarantsoa, he replaced the former deputy Yvan Randriasandratriniony who was named Minister of Decentralization and Regional Planning.
