= Solofo Andrianjafimahatratra =

Malagasy politician

Solofo Andrianjafimahatratra is a Malagasy politician. A member of the National Assembly of Madagascar, he was elected as a member of the Tiako I Madagasikara party; he represents the sixth constituency of Antananarivo.
