= Norovelomampionona Roberthine Rabetafika =

Malagasy politician

Norovelomampionona Roberthine Rabetafika is a Malagasy politician. A member of the National Assembly of Madagascar, she was elected in the 2007 Malagasy parliamentary elections as a member of the Isandra Mivoatsa party. She was reelected in 2013 as a member of Vondrona Politika - VP-MMM. She represents the constituency of Isandra.
