= Jacques Sylla =

Malagasy politician (1946–2009)

His Excellency Jacques Sylla
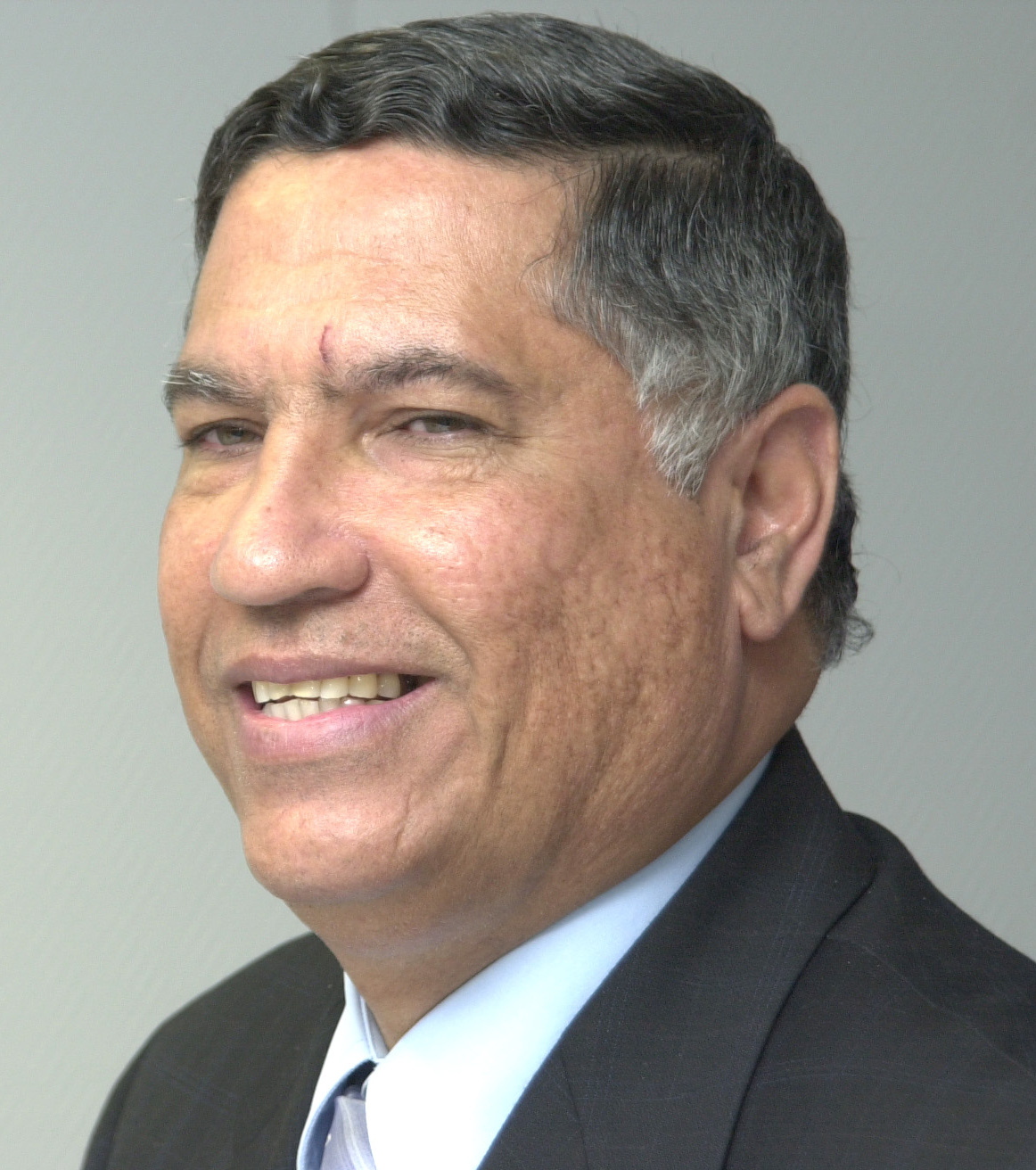
- Sylla in 2003

14th President of the National Assembly of Madagascar
- In office 24 October 2007 – 19 March 2009
- President: Marc Ravalomanana; Hyppolite Ramaroson (Acting); Andry Rajoelina
- Preceded by: Samuel Mahafaritsy Rakatakaninina
- Succeeded by: Andrianantoandro Raharinaivo (2010)

19th Prime Minister of Madagascar
- In office 27 May 2002 – 20 January 2007 (Disputed with Tantely Andrianarivo from 26 February–31 May 2002)
- President: Marc Ravalomanana
- Preceded by: Tantely Andrianarivo
- Succeeded by: Charles Rabemananjara

Personal details
- Born: Jacque Hugues Sylla; 22 July 1946 Sainte Marie, French Madagascar
- Died: 26 December 2009 (aged 63) Antananarivo, Madagascar
- Party: Independent
- Parent: Albert Sylla (father)

Jacques Hugues Sylla (22 July 1946 – 26 December 2009) was a Malagasy politician. He was the Prime Minister of Madagascar under President Marc Ravalomanana from February 2002 to January 2007. He subsequently served as the President of the National Assembly of Madagascar from October 2007 to March 2009.

== Life and career ==
Sylla was born on 22 July 1946 on the island of Sainte-Marie, Analanjirofo, off the east coast of Madagascar. He was the son of Albert Sylla, who served as Foreign Minister under Madagascar's first President, Philibert Tsiranana, until being killed in a plane crash in July 1967. He served as Foreign Minister himself from 1993 to 1996, under President Albert Zafy. He was an opponent of President Didier Ratsiraka and was one of the lawyers advising Marc Ravalomanana when he was elected Mayor of Antananarivo in 1999. Sylla was also a founder of the Toamasina section of the National Committee for the Observation of Elections.

Sylla backed Ravalomanana in the crisis that followed the December 2001 presidential election and argued Ravalomanana's case before the High Constitutional Court. On February 26, 2002, in the midst of the crisis, Ravalomanana named Sylla as Prime Minister, a few days after Ravalomanana declared himself president. After Ravalomanana was sworn in for a second time in early May, Sylla was reappointed as Prime Minister on May 9.

Later in 2002, Sylla became the Secretary General of the ruling Tiako I Madagasikara (TIM) party; this marked the first time that he had ever been a member of a political party.

Sylla resigned as Prime Minister on 19 January 2007, at the end of Ravalomanana's first term; his resignation was accepted by Ravalomanana, who appointed Charles Rabemananjara as Prime Minister on 20 January.

In the September 2007 parliamentary election, Sylla stood as a TIM candidate in the Sainte-Marie constituency, winning with 51.04% of the vote according to provisional results. When the new session of the National Assembly began, Sylla was elected as President of the National Assembly on October 23, 2007; he was the only candidate and received 123 votes from the 124 deputies present, with one blank vote.

As President of the National Assembly, Sylla was an ex officio member of the national political bureau of TIM and therefore remained on the political bureau at TIM's May 2008 congress.

Sylla was a Catholic, a Côtier, and had dual Malagasy and French nationality.

=== Role in 2009 political crisis ===
During the 2009 Malagasy political crisis, Sylla participated in negotiations between President Ravalomanana and opposition leader Andry Rajoelina on February 24, 2009. Subsequently, at an opposition rally on March 14, 2009, Sylla announced that he was joining the opposition and said that Ravalomanana should resign; according to Sylla, that was the only solution and "as President of the National Assembly, I have to recognise reality."

Rajoelina appointed Sylla as President of the Transitional Congress on 8 September 2009; he also appointed a new government on the same date. He ostensibly did so in the spirit of the Maputo agreement between Malagasy political leaders, which called for the creation of a national unity government, but the opposition denounced Rajoelina's appointments, and Sylla was considered to have completely broken with Ravalomanana.

Sylla died on 26 December 2009 at the age of 63 after a long illness.

Political offices
Preceded by Tantely Andrianarivo	Prime Minister of Madagascar; 2002-2007	Succeeded by Charles Rabemananjara
