= Roberto Tinoka =

- Roberto Michaël Raharoarilala Tinoka
- Born: 30 April 1974 (age 51); Toliara
- Citizenship: Madagascar

Roberto Tinoka (full name: (Roberto Michaël Raharoarilala Tinoka) is a Madagascar member of the National Assembly of Madagascar and cabinet minister. He is Madagascar's minister of transport and was formerly minister of youth and sport. He is also national secretary for the TGV (Tanora malaGasy Vonona – Ivelany) party for the province of Toliara (Tuléar).

He was elected mayor of Sakaraha in 2003 and in 2014 he was elected deputy in the 2013 Malagasy general elections. He had been the vice-president of the Malagasy National Assembly from February to May 2014. He was named consul general of Madagascar in La Réunion in April 2023 that was considered by some as being discarded.
