= Jules Henri Randriamaholison =

Malagasy politician

Jules Henri Randriamaholison is a Malagasy politician. A member of the National Assembly of Madagascar, he was elected as a member of the Tiako I Madagasikara party; he represents the first constituency of Antananarivo.
