= Armand Mahatafa =

Malagasy politician

Armand Mahatafa is a Malagasy politician. A member of the National Assembly of Madagascar, he was elected as a member of the Tiako I Madagasikara party; he represents the second constituency of Toliary.
