= Social Democratic Party of Madagascar =

Political party in Madagascar

Social Democratic Party of Madagascar Parti social-démocrate malgache
- Abbreviation: PSD
- National Secretary: Siteny Randrianasoloniaiko
- Deputy National Secretary: Éliana Marie Bezaza
- Founder: Philibert Tsiranana
- Founded: 1956
- Ideology: Social democracy Democratic socialism
- Political position: Left-wing
- National affiliation: Firaisankina
- International affiliation: Socialist International
- National Assembly: 4 / 163

Website
- psd-madagascar.com (archived)

The Social Democratic Party of Madagascar (French: Parti social-démocrate malgache, PSD) is a political party in Madagascar.

== History ==
The party was founded in 1956 in the Majunga district as the Social Democratic Party of Madagascar and the Comoros. It was led by Philibert Tsiranana, a member of the French National Assembly. Tsiranana had joined the French Section of the Workers' International (SFIO) group, and the French SFIO government aided the construction of the PSD. The party campaigned for continued links with France in the 1958 referendum. PSD allied itself with the Socialist Democratic Union of Madagascar, forming the Republican Cartel.

Since 19 August 2023, the National Secretary of the SDP is Siteny Randrianasoloniaiko, who replaced Éliana Marie Bezaza in the post. Bezaza became his deputy.

== Electoral history ==
=== Presidential elections ===
Election	Candidate	Votes	%	Votes	%	Results
Election	Candidate	First round		Second round		Results
1965	Philibert Tsiranana	2,451,441	97.78%	—		Elected ✓
1972	Philibert Tsiranana	?	99.70%	—		Elected ✓
1982	Barred from running					
1989	Barred from running					
1992–93	Ruffine Tsiranana	152,952	3.47%	—		Lost ✗
1996	Did not contest					
2001	Did not contest					
2006	Did not contest					
2013	Did not contest					
2018	Eliana Bezaza	40,882	0.82%	—		Lost ✗
2023	Siteny Randrianasoloniaiko	697,691	14.39%	—		Lost ✗

=== National Assembly elections ===
Election	Votes	%	Seats	+/−	Position	Government
1960	1,156,684	61.6%	76 / 127	▲76	▲1st	Government
1965	2,277,055	94.58%	104 / 107	▲28	1st	Supermajority government
1970	2,413,421	92.77%	104 / 107	Steady	1st	Supermajority government
1977	Barred from running					
1983	Barred from running					
1989	Barred from running					
1993	Did not contest					
1998	Did not contest					
2002	Did not contest					
2007	Did not contest					
2013	21,037	0.56%	1 / 151	▲1	▲10th	Opposition
2019	15,267	0.38%	0 / 151	▼1	▼13th	Extraparliamentary opposition

== Followed by ==
- Rebirth of the Social Democratic Party

== See also ==
- Fatima Achimo
