= Jean Claude Chan Se =

Malagasy politician

Alain Claude Chan Se is a Malagasy politician. A member of the National Assembly of Madagascar, he was elected as a member of the Tiako I Madagasikara party.

He was the suppleant of Mahafaritsy Samuel Razakanirina who was named ambassador in Algeria and represents the second constituency of Toliary.
