= Jean de la Croix Ramambason =

Malagasy politician

Jean de la Croix Ramambason is a Malagasy politician. A member of the National Assembly of Madagascar, he was elected as a member of the Tiako i Madagasikara party; he represents the sixth constituency of Antananarivo.
