= Rakotoarimanana =

Rakotoarimanana is a Malagasy surname.

== People ==
- Fabio Rakotoarimanana (born 2003), Malagasy table tennis player
- Joelison Emanoela Rakotoarimanana, Malagasy politician
- Joseph Rakotoarimanana (born 1972), retired Malagasy athlete
- Patrice Rakotoarimanana, Malagasy politician
