= Benjamin Ramamonjisoa =

Malagasy politician

- Occupation: Politician
- Years active: 2007-2009, 2013-present
- Political party: Tiako I Madagasikara

Benjamin Ramamonjisoa is a Malagasy politician. A member of the National Assembly of Madagascar, he was elected as a member of the Tiako I Madagasikara (TIM) banner. He represents the constituency of Antananarivo Atsimondrano.
