= Harinjatovo Rakotondramanana =

Malagasy actor and politician (died 2022)

- Died: 10 November 2022
- Citizenship: Madagascar
- Occupation(s): actor, journalist and politician

Harinjatovo Rakotondramanana (also known as Hary Kalizy and Ralay died 10 November 2022) was a Malagasy actor, journalist and politician. A member of the National Assembly of Madagascar, he was elected as an independent in the 2007 Malagasy parliamentary elections. He represented the constituency of Mahajanga.
