= Lydia Aimée Vololona Rahantasoa =

Malagasy politician

Lydia Aimée Vololona Rahantasoa is a Malagasy politician. A member of Tiako i Madagasikara, she represented Manjakandriana in the National Assembly in 2011, being re-elected in 2014. She was Minister of Technical Education and Vocational Training under the Ntsay government, from June 2018 to January 2019.
