= Patrice Rakotoarimanana =

Malagasy politician

Patrice Rakotoarimanana is a Malagasy politician. A member of the National Assembly of Madagascar, he represents the constituency of Andilamena.

He was elected as an independent candidate in the 2007 Malagasy parliamentary elections and reelected in 2019.
