= Botomananatsara =

Malagasy politician

Botomananatsara is a Malagasy politician. A member of the Transition Congress and the National Assembly of Madagascar, he was elected as a member of the Tiako i Madagasikara party; he represents the constituency of Manakara.
