= Albert Sylla =

Malagasy doctor and politician

- Born: February 18, 1909; Tuléar
- Died: July 19, 1967 (aged 58); Antananarivo, Madagascar
- Education: School of Medicine, Antananarivo
- Medical career
- Profession: Senior Medical Officer

Albert Sylla (18 February 1909 – 19 July 1967) was a Malagasy medical doctor and politician.

== Early life ==
Sylla was born to an unknown French father and a Creole mother, Louisa Sylla, on 18 February 1909 in Tuléar.

As a child he was educated in nous Catholic missions, attending the Brothers of Saint Gabriel in Nosy Be, and later the College of the Saint Joseph Christian Brothers in Tamatave. After being admitted to the Myre de Vilers school, he began studies at the School of Medicine in Antananarivo in 1926, where he gained the rank of Senior Medical Officer; the highest degree attainable by local officials.

== Personal life ==
In 1932 in Tamatave he married Laguet, a lady of European and Réunion Creole heritage, and they had six children. The family lived in Fianarantsoa, Tuléar, Tananarive, Mananara, Île Sainte-Marie and lastly Tamatave, where he was posted in September 1946, after the birth of his son Jacques. Sylla helped form Parti des déshérités de Madagascar (PADESM), and he entered politics when he was elected as a provincial councillor on 30 March 1952. In the same year he became Deputy Minister of Agriculture and Tourism. His son, Jacques Sylla, served as Prime Minister from 2002 to 2007.

== Career ==
In 1953 he was elected as a councillor to the Assembly of the French Union, and he ran on the list of "Entente franco-malgache dan l'Union francaise". On 28 August 1956, whilst attending a reunion in Tamatave, he became president of the local chapter of the UDSM, which had been formed by Norbert Zafimahova.

In 1958 he became a member of the National Assembly of Madagascar. During this time he travelled extensively, and made unofficial visits to South Korea, Algeria, India, Taiwan, France, Belgium, Kenya, Japan, Greece, amongst others.

After Madagascar gained independence from France on 26 June 1960, Sylla was appointed by President Philibert Tsiranana to the position of Minister of Foreign Affairs, and chaired Madagascar's delegation at meetings of the Organisation of African Unity.

== Death ==
On 19 July 1967, an Air Madagascar Douglas DC-4, on a scheduled flight from Antananarivo to Tamatave and Diego Suarez, crashed after take-off from Ivato International Airport, killing 42 people, including Sylla.

The Madagascar Cabinet held an emergency meeting after the crash, and it was announced that Sylla would be given a state funeral. Sylla was succeeded as foreign minister by Jacques Rabemananjara on 22 August 1967 after President Tsiranana reshuffled his cabinet as a result of Sylla's death.
