= Jean de la Croix Ipirina =

Malagasy politician

Jean de la Croix Ipirina (born c. 1953) is a Malagasy politician. He is a member of the Senate of Madagascar for Analanjirofo, and is a member of the Tiako i Madagasikara party.

In the 2007 election, he was elected to the Senate of Madagascar in the Analanjirofo constituency, receiving 55.88% of the vote against incumbent Boniface Zakalehy.

== See also ==
- Politics of Madagascar
