= Lazafeno =

Malagasy politician

Lazafeno is a Malagasy politician. A member of the National Assembly of Madagascar, he was elected from the Antoko Miombona Ezaka party in the 2007 Malagasy parliamentary elections, he represents the constituency of Bealanana.
