= Liaraike =

Political party in Madagascar

Liaraike is a political party in Anosy, Madagascar. In the 23 September 2007 National Assembly elections, the party won 1 out of 127 seats. Its only deputy is Jean André Soja (called: Kaleta). He formerly was a candidate of TIM - Tiako i Madagasikara

In the 2019 elections Liarlike jointed IRD -Isika Rehetra Miaraka amin'i Andry Rajoelina of Andry Rajoelina and in 2022 Jean André Soja was named Special Counsellor of Political Affairs by President Andry Rajoelina on 7 April 2022, a kind of none-sense counsellor without any special duties for honoring good mood and attributing a good pay.
