= Fifth Ntsay Government =

Government

The Fifth Ntsay Government is the executive government of Madagascar from August 2024 until September 2025. It is led by Prime Minister Christian Ntsay, who has been in office since 2018. In September 2025, following massive protests over frequent water and power outages at the capital of Antananarivo, president Andry Rajoelina fired Ntsay; the later coup eventually dissolved the government.

Following the opening of the new legislature and in accordance with the constitution, Christian Ntsay submitted the resignation of his government to the President of the Republic, who immediately accepted it. He was reappointed to his position two days later and presented his new government on August 22, 2024.

== History ==
=== Formation ===
Following the May 29 Malagasy parliamentary election resulting in a majority in favor of the presidential clan, Christian Ntsay was reappointed by Andry Rajoelina as Prime Minister. His new government was presented on 22 August 2024.

== Initial Composition ==
=== Ministers ===
Position	Name
Minister of Armed Forces	General Sahivelo Lala Monja Delphin
Minister of Foreign Affairs	Rafaravavitafika Rasata
Minister of Justice, Keeper of the Seals	Benjamin Rakotomandimby
Minister of Decentralization and Territorial Planning	Naina Andriantsitohaina
Minister of Economy and Finance	Rindra Hasimbelo Rabarinirinarison
Minister of the Interior	Nirintsoa Rahajavoloniaina
Minister of Public Security	General Police Commissioner Rakotoarimanana Herilala
Minister of Public Health	Prof. Zely Randriamantany
Minister of Higher Education and Scientific Research	Chaminah Loullah
Minister of National Education	Marie Michelle Sahondriarimalala
Minister of Technical Education and Vocational Training	Marie Marcelline Rasoharisoa
Minister of Agriculture and Livestock	François Sergio Hajarison
Minister of Industrialization and Trade	David Ralambofiringa
Minister of Transport and Meteorology	Ramonjavelo Manambahoaka Valéry
Minister of Energy and Hydrocarbons	Olivier Jean-Baptiste
Minister of Public Works	Richard Théodore Rafidison
Minister of Labor, Employment and Public Service	Razakaboana Hanitra
Minister of Mines	Rakotomalala Herindrainy Olivier
Minister of Fisheries and Blue Economy	Tsimanaoraty Paubert Mahatante
Minister of Tourism and Handicrafts	Viviane Dewa
Minister of Population	Aurélie Razafinjato
Minister of Digital Development, Digital Transformation, Posts and Telecommunications	Stéphanie Delmotte
Minister of Water, Sanitation, and Hygiene	Lalaina Andrianamelasoa
Minister of Environment and Sustainable Development	Max Fontaine
Minister of Youth and Sports	Abdoulah Marson Moustapha
Minister of Communication and Culture	Volamiranty Donna Mara

=== Delegated Minister ===
Delegated Minister for National Gendarmerie	Major General Andriamitovy Rakotondrazaka

=== Secretaries of State ===
Position	Name
Secretary of State to the Presidency in charge of New Cities and Housing	Gérard Andriamanohisoa
Secretary of State to the Presidency in charge of Food Sovereignty	Tahian’ny Avo Razanamahefa
