= Manaovasoa =

Political party in Madagascar

Manaovasoa is political party in Madagascar. The party chairman was Manan'Ignace Rakotomalala, formerly leader of the AKFM party. He was succeeded by Dieudonnée Razafimahatratra in 2011.

For the 2007 Malagasy parliamentary election, Manaovasoa formed the alliance TMM with MONIMA and Tambatra but they did not succeed in having a representative elected.
