= DOVO =

DOVO or Dovo may refer to:

- VV DOVO, Dutch football club
- Eloi Alphonse Maxime Dovo, Malagasy diplomat and politician
