= Vohibato Tapa-kevitsa =

Political party in Madagascar

Vohibato Tapa-kevitsa is a political party in Madagascar. In the 23 September 2007 National Assembly elections, the party won 1 out of 127 seats, Aurélie Marie Augustine Razafinjato of Vohibato (district).
