= Brun-Ly =

Political party in Madagascar

Brun-Ly was a political party in Madagascar & personal movement of the businessman Bruno Rajaonson (nicknamed: Brun-Ly). On the date of 23 September 2007 National Assembly elections, the party won 1 out of 127 seats, the deputy of Marovoay, Bruno Rajaonson.

It is no longer represented in the Malagasy chamber of deputies.
