= 1960 Malagasy parliamentary election =

- 4 September 1960

All 127 seats in the National Assembly 64 seats needed for a majority
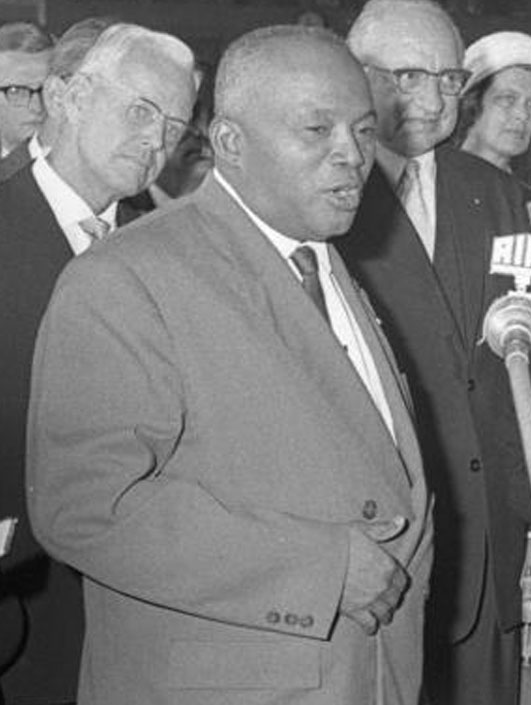

	First party	Second party
Leader	Philibert Tsiranana
Party	PSD	AKFM
Seats won	76	9
Popular vote	1,156,684	220,640
Percentage	61.6%	10.7%

Parliamentary elections were held in Madagascar on 4 September 1960. They were won by the Social Democratic Party, which claimed 76 of the 127 seats in the National Assembly. Voter turnout was 77.5%.

== Results ==
Party	Votes	%	Seats
Social Democratic Party	1,156,684	61.6	76
Congress Party for the Independence of Madagascar	220,640	10.7	9
National Rally of Madagascar			5
Malagasy Christian Rally			3
Malagasy Democratic and Social Union			1
Others			33
Total			127
Valid votes	1,876,586	99.11	
Invalid/blank votes	16,883	0.89	
Total votes	1,893,469	100.00	
Registered voters/turnout	2,444,269	77.47	
Source: Nohlen et al.
