= Ramanantsoa =

Ramanantsoa is a Malagasy surname. Notable people with the surname include:

- Bernard Ramanantsoa (born 1948), French school dean
- Gabriel Ramanantsoa (1906-1979), eighth prime minister of Madagascar
- Tsilavina Ramanantsoa (born 1992), Malagasy swimmer
- Tsimisotry Ramanantsoa (fl. 2007-present), Malagasy politician
