= 1970 Malagasy parliamentary election =

- 6 September 1970

All 107 seats in the National Assembly 54 seats needed for a majority
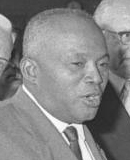

	First party	Second party
Leader	Philibert Tsiranana
Party	PSD	AKFM
Last election	104	3
Seats won	104	3
Seat change	Steady	Steady
Popular vote	2,413,421	186,626
Percentage	92.77%	7.17%
Swing	▼1.81pp	▲4.31pp

Parliamentary elections were held in Madagascar on 6 September 1970. The result was a victory for the ruling Social Democratic Party, which won 104 of the 107 seats in the National Assembly. Voter turnout was 95%.

== Results ==
Party	Votes	%	Seats	+/–
Social Democratic Party	2,413,421	92.77	104	0
Congress Party for the Independence of Madagascar	186,626	7.17	3	0
Others	1,381	0.05	0	0
Total	2,601,428	100.00	107	0
Valid votes	2,601,428	99.56		
Invalid/blank votes	11,528	0.44		
Total votes	2,612,956	100.00		
Registered voters/turnout	2,756,978	94.78		
Source: EISA
