= Malagasy Tia Tanindrazana =

Political party in Madagascar

- Abbreviation: MA.TI.TA.

Malagasy Tia Tanindrazana (lit. 'Malagasy Patriots' or 'Patriotic Malagasies', MA.TI.TA.) is a political party in Madagascar. It elected one seat in the National Assembly in 2019.

== Election results ==
Parliament of Madagascar
| Election | Votes | Vote % | Seats |
|---|---|---|---|
| 2019 | 48,477 | 1.20 | 1 / 151 |
| 2024 | | | 0 / 151 |
