= Mongo (newspaper) =

Issue 41 of Mongo

Mongo ('The Oppressed') was a Malagasy language weekly newspaper published from Tananarive, Madagascar 1937-1939 and 1946–1947. The first issue was published on February 2, 1937. It was an organ of the Communist Party (French Section of the Communist International) of the Region of Madagascar. Mongo was one of the progressive Malagasy-language publications that emerged during the Popular Front period. The director of Mongo was initially D. Ribera Lègue, a role later taken over by Rakotoarison, G. Rabarijaona and E. Rasolomanana. The name 'Mongo' alluded to Jean Ralaimongo, to whom most of the founders of the newspaper (such as Ribera Lègue) had been close. The newspaper had a circulation of 5,000 copies.

Similar to other communist publications, in 1938 the readership of Mongo decreased and circulation dropped to 1,000. Mongo vehemently denounced governor Léon Cayla as a 'fascist'. Publication stopped in 1939.

Mongo resumed publication again in 1946. The last issue of Mongo was published on April 1, 1947.
