= Justin Tokely =

Malagasy politician

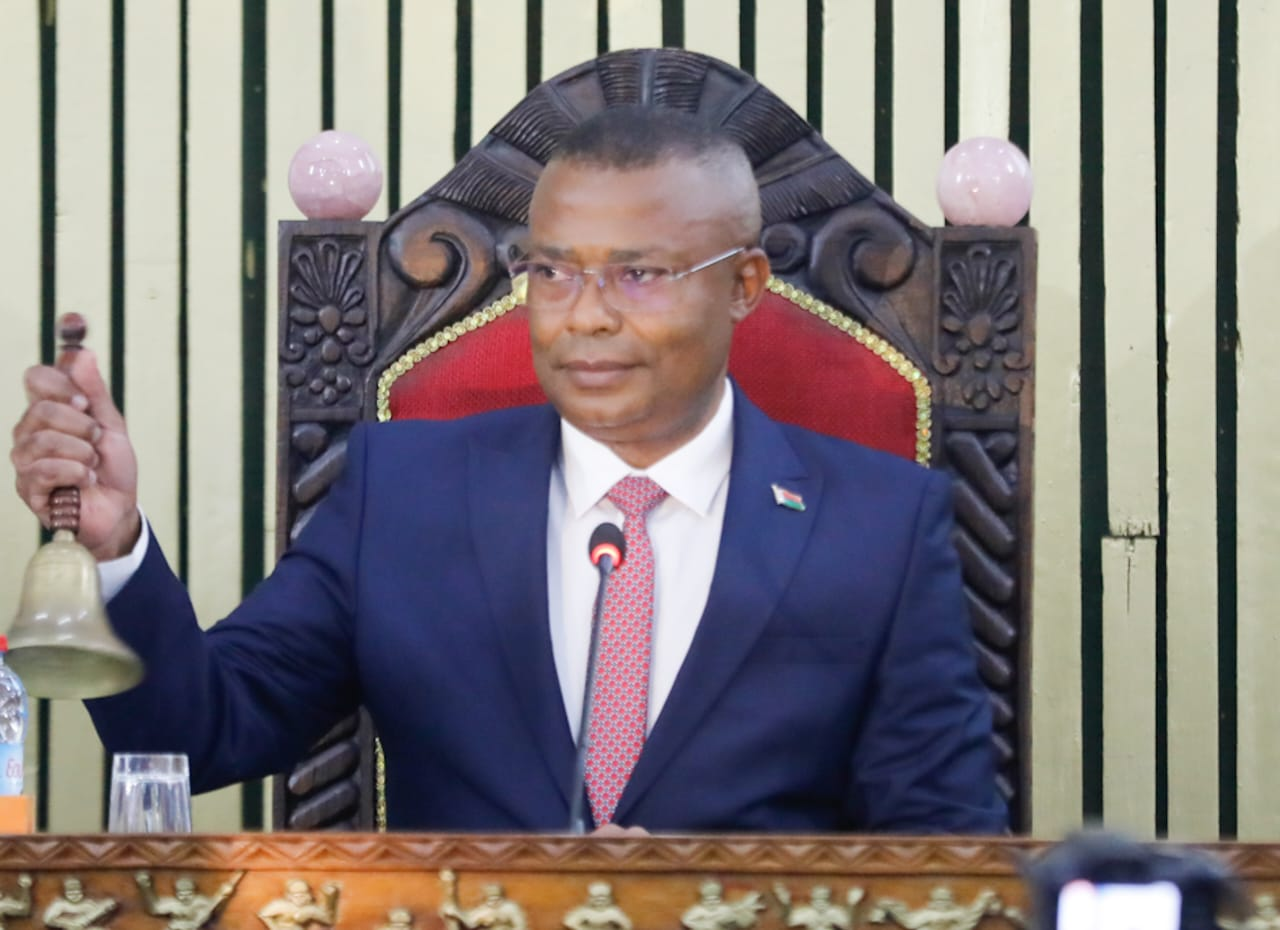

President of the National Assembly of Madagascar
- In office 12 July 2024 – 15 October 2025
- Preceded by: Christine Razanamahasoa
- Succeeded by: Siteny Randrianasoloniaiko

Personal details
- Born: 18 February 1974 (age 51)
- Political party: IRMAR
- Education: University of Antananarivo; École nationale d'administration de Madagascar

Justin Tokely (born 18 February 1974) is a Malagasy politician who served as the President of the National Assembly of Madagascar from July 2024 to October 2025.

== Biography ==
Tokely was born on 18 February 1974. He is from the city of Sambava in northeast Madagascar and is a member of the Betsimisaraka people. He attended the University of Antananarivo where he received a master's degree in 1991. He later attended the École nationale d'administration de Madagascar (National School of Administration of Madagascar, ENAM) and received a civil administrator diploma.

After his education, Tokely held several administrative positions in the area, including for the Fenoarivo-Atsinanana district from 2004 to 2005, and as district chief for Andapa District from 2005 to 2009, and then Ambilobe district from 2009 to 2014. He then joined the Madagascar Ministry of the Interior and became the director of the Institut National de Décentralisation et de Développement Local (National Institute for Decentralization and Local Development, INDDL), a position he served in from 2014 to 2018. He became the director general of the INDDL in 2018 and served until 2019.

In October 2019, Tokely was appointed the governor of Sava Region. During his tenure as governor, he notably led the construction of the Avenue de l'Emergence, a 785-metre paved road in Sambava. In 2022, he was named the Minister of the Interior and Decentralization, a position he served in for two years, before his title was changed to just Minister of the Interior in January 2024. In April 2024, he announced his resignation to run in the parliamentary election as a representative of Sambava, running under the IRMAR party. After winning election to the parliament, he ran to be the President of the National Assembly and was unanimously elected by the 160 deputies present in July 2024.
