= Rakotoarisoa =

Rakotoarisoa is a Malagasy surname.

== People ==
- Tisbite Rakotoarisoa (born 1951), Malagasy Olympic middle-distance runner
- Andrianirina Marie Bruno Rakotoarisoa, Malagasy politician
- Baggio Rakotoarisoa (born 1996), Malagasy international footballer
