= Aurélie Marie Augustine Razafinjato =

Malagasy politician

Aurélie Marie Augustine Razafinjato is a Malagasy politician. A member of the National Assembly of Madagascar, she was elected as an independent; she represents the constituency of Vohibato (district).

In March 2019 she had been The Secretary General of the Ministry of Education. In 2020 was a member of the presidential party Together with President Andry Rajoelina (Isika Rehetra Miaraka amin’i Andry Rajoelina).
