= Siteny Randrianasoloniaiko =

Madagascar politician and judoka (born 1972)

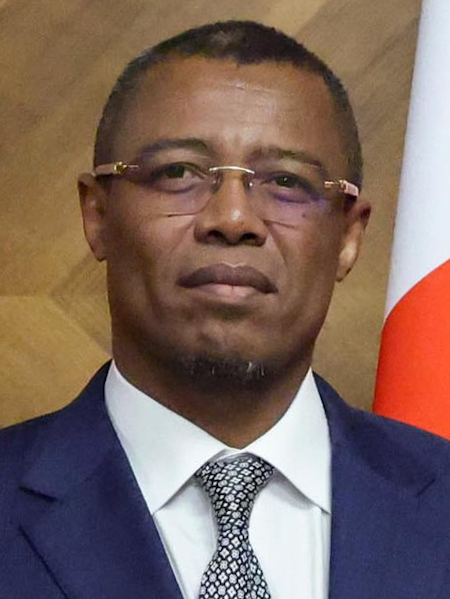
- Randrianasoloniaiko in 2025

President of the National Assembly of Madagascar
- Incumbent
- Assumed office 15 October 2025
- Preceded by: Justin Tokely

National Secretary of the Social Democratic Party of Madagascar
- Incumbent
- Assumed office 19 August 2023
- Preceded by: Éliana Marie Bezaza

Member of the National Assembly
- Incumbent
- Assumed office 14 February 2014
- Constituency: Toliara I

Personal details
- Born: 27 July 1972 (age 53) Toliara, Malagasy Republic
- Party: PSD (since 2023)

Siteny Thierry Randrianasoloniaiko (born 27 July 1972) is a Malagasy judo executive, businessman, and politician. He is currently serving as the President of the National Assembly of Madagascar since October 2025.

== Sporting executive ==
He has served as the president of the Malagasy Judo Federation since 2010, chairman of the African Judo Union since 2015, and a vice-president of the International Judo Federation ex-officio as a holder of the prior position, as well as President of the Malagasy Olympic Committee since 2011.

== Business career ==
Since 2007, he is the CEO of Siteny Immobilier, Siteny Distribution and TV Plus of Toliara, and is the CEO of Siteny Company Distribution for Airtel Madagascar since 2013.

== Political career ==
Randrianasoloniaiko is a member of the Parliament of Madagascar since 2014, when he was elected as a member of the Together with President Andry Rajoelina (Isika Rehetra Miaraka amin’i Andry Rajoelina, IRD) coalition. He also ran as a candidate in the 2023 Malagasy presidential election as a member of the opposition, later dropping out alongside a wider opposition boycott, although he still received over 14% of the votes, finishing in second place. He appealed to the Supreme Court in order to annul the election results, claiming electoral fraud.
