= Joelison Emanoela Rakotoarimanana =

Malagasy politician

Joelison Emanoela Rakotoarimanana is a Malagasy politician. A member of the National Assembly of Madagascar, he was elected as a member of the Tiako i Madagasikara party; he represents the constituency of Betafo.
