= List of ambassadors of Madagascar to China =

Coordinates: 39.942509°N 116.458169°E

Ambassador of Madagascar to the People's Republic of China
- Incumbent; Jean Louis Robinson since April 14, 2021
- Inaugural holder: Emmanuel Arsène Rakotovahiny
- Formation: August 26, 1964

The Malagasy ambassador in Beijing is the official representative of the Government in Antananarivo to the Government of the People's Republic of China.

== List of representatives ==
Diplomatic agrément/Diplomatic accreditation	ambassador	Observations	Prime Minister of Madagascar	Premier of the People's Republic of China	Term end
August 1, 1960		The government of Taipei appointed its first ambassador in Tananarive.	Philibert Tsiranana	Chen Cheng	
August 26, 1964	Emmanuel Arsène Rakotovahiny	Malagasy Ambassador to the Republic of China, 1959: Député	Philibert Tsiranana	Yen Chia-kan	1969
August 1, 1970	Benjamin Razafintseheno	In August 1970, the Government of the Malagasy Republic appointed Benjamin Razafintseheno as ambassador to China, replacing Ambassador Arsene Rakotovahiny.	Philibert Tsiranana	Yen Chia-kan	
November 6, 1972		The governments in Beijing and Tananarive established diplomatic relations.	Gabriel Ramanantsoa	Zhou Enlai	
1973	Albert Rakoto Ratsimamanga		Gabriel Ramanantsoa	Zhou Enlai	1974
May 25, 1974	Armand Rajaonarivelo		Gabriel Ramanantsoa	Zhou Enlai	
1975	Solohery Crescent Rakotofiringa		Gabriel Ramanantsoa	Zhou Enlai	1983
1984	Jean Jacques Maurice	On November 21, 1998 he was accredited as ambassador in Moscow.	Désiré Rakotoarijaona	Zhao Ziyang	2000
2002	Royal Michselisson Raoelfils	(*1939; † October 31, 2015)	Jacques Sylla	Zhu Rongji	
September 21, 2002	Besoa Razafimaharo		Jacques Sylla	Zhu Rongji	
November 22, 2002	Victor Sikonina		Jacques Sylla	Zhu Rongji	
2018	Eric Fadola Razafimandimby				
2019	Jean Louis Robinson				
