= National Union (Madagascar) =

The National Union (Malagasy: Firaisankinam-Pirenena) was an alliance of the political parties TIM, AVI and RPSD in Madagascar. The alliance participated in the last legislative elections, 15 December 2002, and won 8.8% of the popular vote and 22 out of 160 seats. The National Union had one of the highest-per-capita representation rates in sub-saharan Africa.

As of 2007, 7 members of the parliament are labelled as representatives of Firaisankinam-pirenena.
