= Christine Razanamahasoa =

Malagasy politician

Her Excellency Christine Razanamahasoa
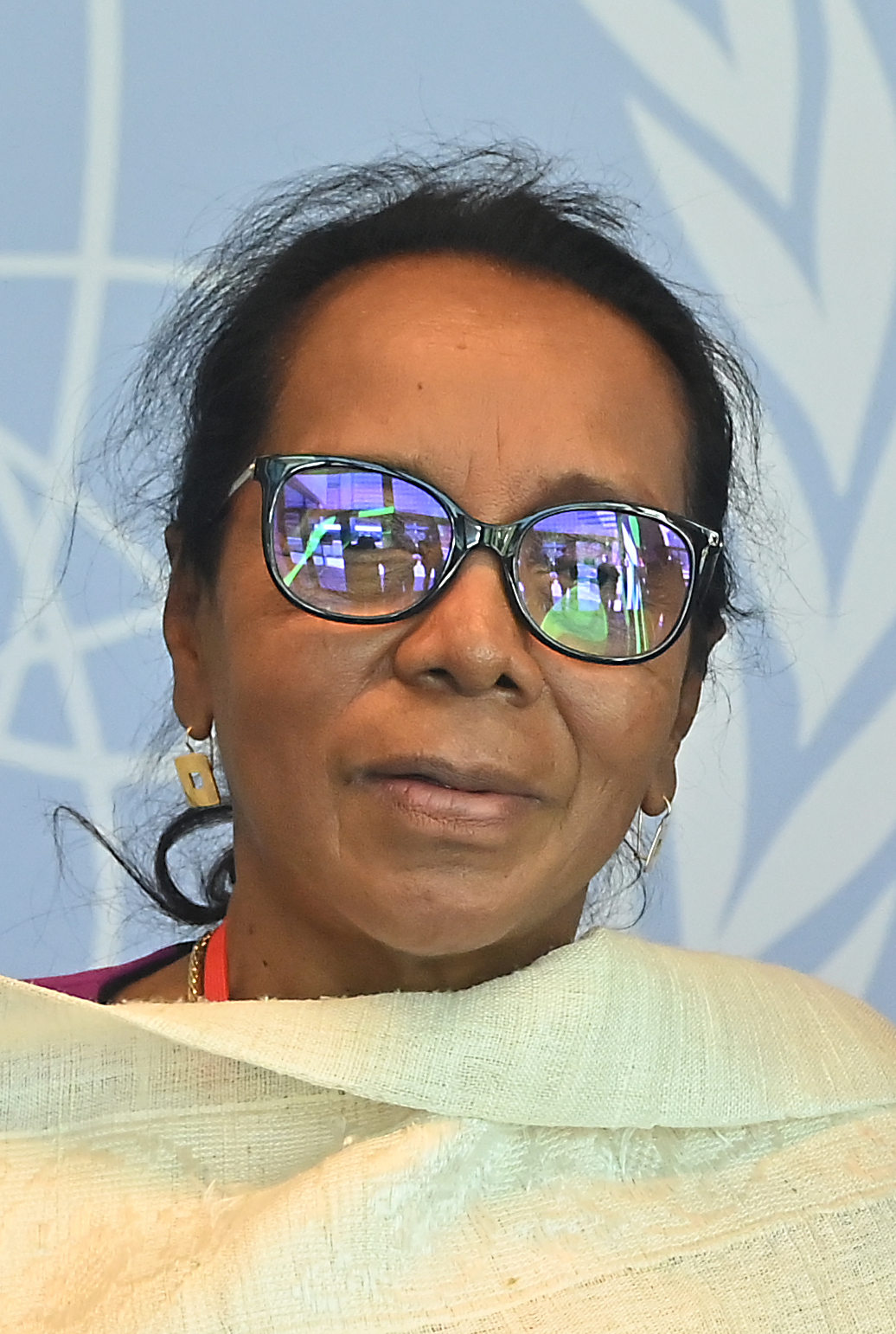

President of the National Assembly of Madagascar
- In office 16 July 2019 – 12 July 2024
- President: Andry Rajoelina
- Preceded by: Jean Max Rakotomamonjy
- Succeeded by: Justin Tokely
- In office 18 February 2014 – 3 May 2014
- President: Hery Rajaonarimampianina
- Preceded by: Andrianantoandro Raharinaivo (As President of the Lower Transitional House)
- Succeeded by: Jean Max Rakotomamonjy

Personal details
- Profession: Lawyer

Christine Harijaona Razanamahasoa is a Malagasy politician. She served as a Minister of Justice between 2009 and 2013, and as the president of the National Assembly of Madagascar from February till May 2014, becoming the first woman in this position. She was elected again on 16 July 2019.

Christine Razanamahasoa is a lawyer by education.

On 17 March 2009, as a result of 2009 Malagasy political crisis, president Marc Ravalomanana was removed from his position, and the High Transitional Authority, led by Andry Rajoelina, was formed. The High transition authority elected Rajoelina the president of Madagascar, and Albert Camille Vital became the Prime Minister and formed the government. Christine Razanamahasoa became the Minister of Justice in that government. On 28 October 2011, Rajoelina dismissed the government and asked Omer Beriziky to form the new one. Razanamahasoa joined the new government, and on 31 October 2013 resigned and was replaced by Florent Rakotoarisoa. The reason for her resignation was that she intended to participate in forthcoming national elections.

In 2013, she was elected to the National Assembly from Ambatofinandrahana District representing the MAPAR party, founded by the former president Andry Rajoelina. On 5 May 2014, the parliament elected the new president, and dismissed Razanamahasoa. The High Constitutional Court later confirmed that the voting was legal. She remained the deputy and the national coordinator of MAPAR. In March 2024, the High Constitutional Court (HCC) pronounced the disqualification of Christine Razanamahasoa from her position as deputy "with all the legal consequences".
