= Andrianantoandro Raharinaivo =

Malagasy politician

Andrianantoandro Raharinaivo is a Malagasy politician. A member of the National Assembly of Madagascar, he was elected as a member of the Tiako I Madagasikara party in the 2007 Malagasy parliamentary elections; he represents the constituency of Ambohidratrimo.

He was arrested during the Coup d'État in 2009.

He was the president of the transitional lower house of Madagascar parliament from October 2010 to February 2014.
