= 2023 Malagasy presidential election =

- 16 November 2023
- Turnout: 46.35%
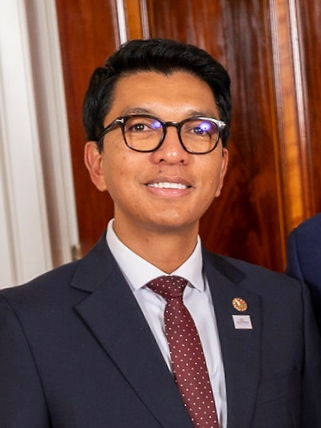

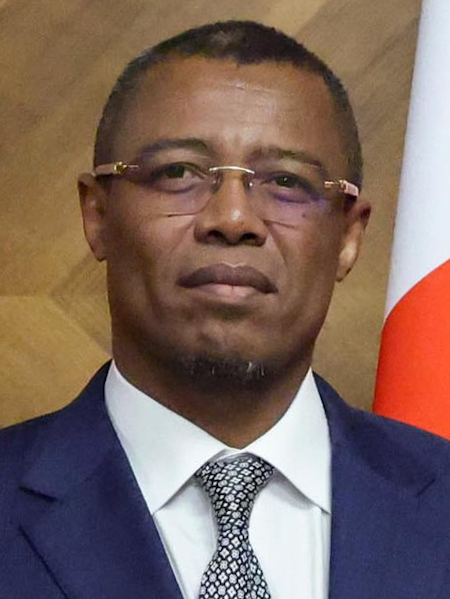

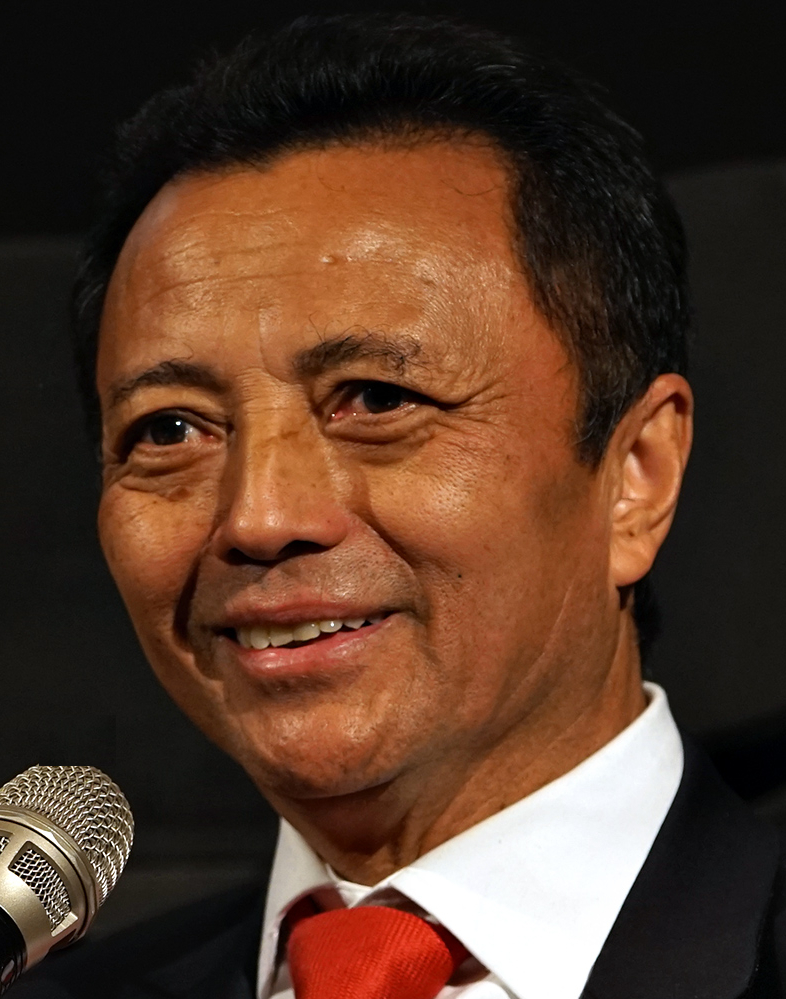

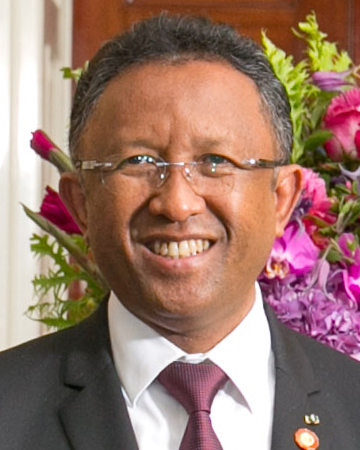
Nominee	Andry Rajoelina	Siteny Randrianasoloniaiko
Party	TGV	PSD
Popular vote	2,858,947	697,691
Percentage	58.96%	14.39%
Nominee	Marc Ravalomanana	Hery Rajaonarimampianina
Party	TIM	HVM
Popular vote	586,282	251,144
Percentage	12.09%	5.18%
President before election
Cabinet
(interim, from 9 September 2023 to 27 October 2023)
Richard Ravalomanana
(interim, from 27 October 2023)
Elected President
Andry Rajoelina
TGV

Presidential elections were scheduled to be held in Madagascar on 9 November 2023, with a second round on 20 December if required. On 12 October 2023, it was announced that the election would be postponed by one week to 16 November because of pre-election unrest.

Andry Rajoelina was re-elected to another term with 58.95% of the vote in the first round. Turnout was 46.36%, the lowest in a presidential election in the country's history.

== Electoral system ==
The President of Madagascar is elected using the two-round system; if no candidate receives a majority of the votes in the first round, a run-off will be held.

== Candidates ==
A total of 28 candidates applied to run for the presidency. In the High Constitutional Court decision published on 9 September 2023, only 13 candidates out of 28 were accepted:

They are, by their order on the ballot, decided by sortition:

1. Tahina Razafinjoelina
2. Hajo Andrianainarivelo
3. Andry Rajoelina
4. Roland Ratsiraka
5. Marc Ravalomanana
6. Auguste Richard Paraina
7. Andry Tsiverizo Raobelina Andriamalala
8. Jean Brunelle Razafintsiandraofa
9. Lalaina Harilanto Ratsirahonanana
10. Hery Rajaonarimampianina
11. Sendrison Daniela Raderanirina
12. Jean-Jacques Jedidia Ratsietison
13. Siteny Randrianasoloniaiko
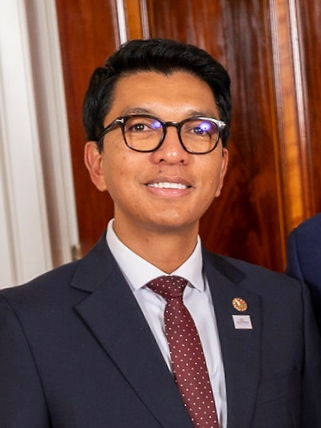
Andry Rajoelina (in 2022)

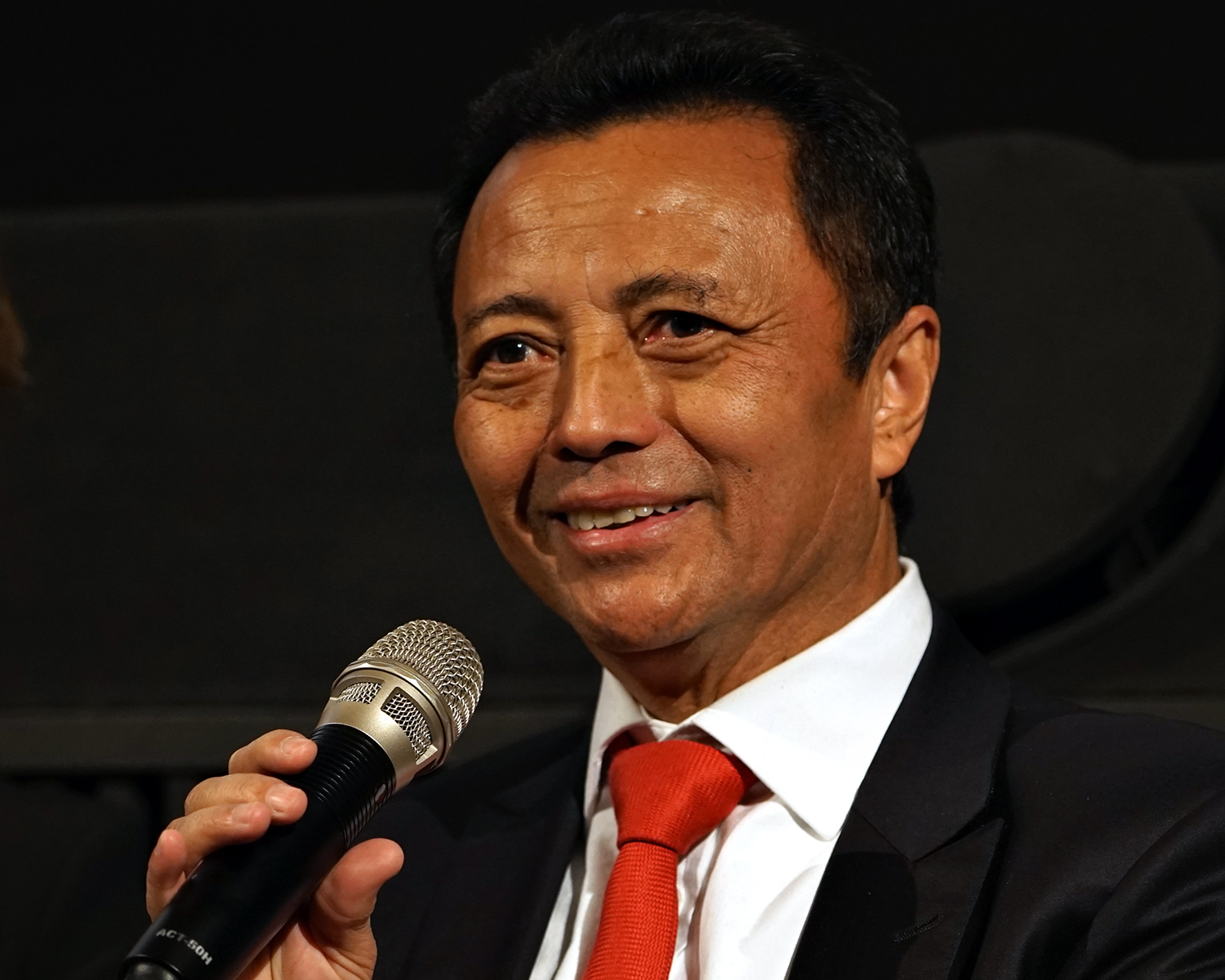
Marc Ravalomanana

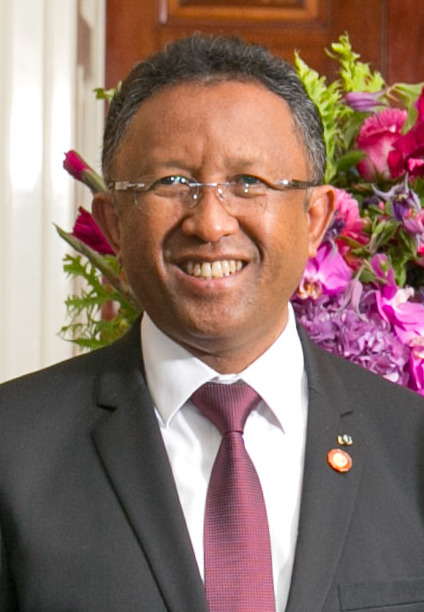
Hery Rajaonarimampianina

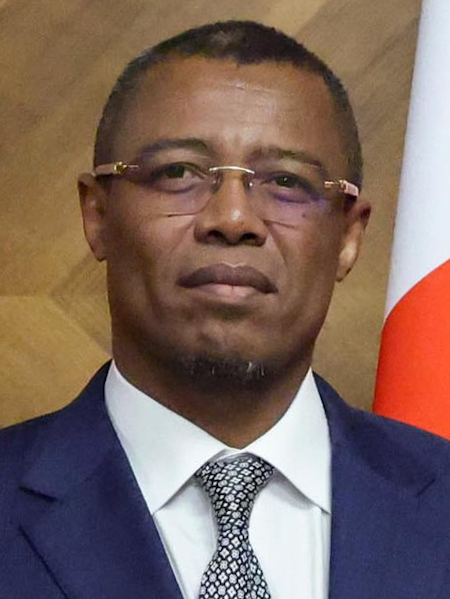
Siteny Randrianasoloniaiko

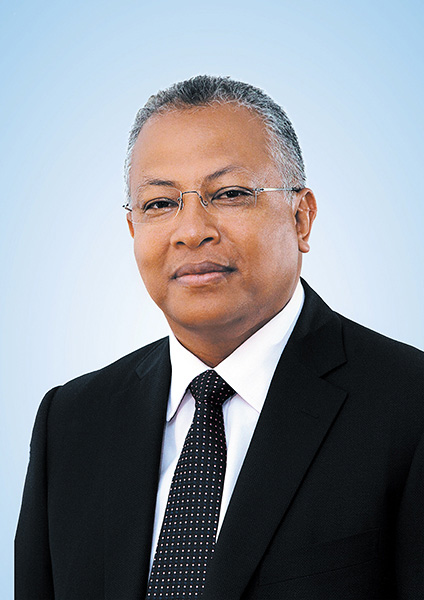
Hajo Andrianainarivelo

=== Declared but not registered ===
- Noël Abel Jean
- Heritiana Guy LaChapelle
- James Rasoamaka
- Julia Mickaelle Rasolofonoroniaina
- Marie Josiane Vololonirina
- Monja Roindefo
- Claude Raharivoatra
- Elias Ralaiarimanana
- James Francklin Rakotomahanina
- Eufraime Randrianambinina
- Jean Bruno Betsy Andriamanolo
- Miarintoa Rasolofotinana
- Désiré Nivo Raharovoatra

=== Withdrew ===
- Masy Goulamaly
- Annick Ratsiraka

== Campaign ==
During an opposition campaign rally held on 2 October 2023, Marc Ravalomanana, himself a former President and candidate in the election, suffered a leg injury following the use of teargas by the police.

On the same day, candidate Andry Raobelina suffered an injury to the face from a part of an exploded tear gas canister, which prompted him to call for a report of the election to the Haute cour constitutionnelle. The latter decided on 12 October to move the first round from 9 November to 16 November.

== Conduct ==
=== Prohibition of political rallies in the open ===
In April 2023, incumbent Rajoelina prohibited all political rallies in the open. This was condemned by representatives of the European Union, United Kingdom, United States, Germany, France, Switzerland, Norway and Japan.

=== Lack of funding ===
In a letter to the European Union from May 2023 Rajoelina asked for 30 million euros for assisting in organizing the elections.

=== Dual nationality of Rajoelina ===
In June 2023 it was discovered that Rajoelina had acquired French nationality for himself, his wife and their three children in 2014. Under Malagasy law, this may have disqualified him from the presidency, as only citizens of Madagascar are eligible to hold the position, and the country imposes a loss of citizenship if voluntarily acquiring another nationality. Rajoelina argued that he automatically obtained the French nationality through his father and only formalized it, meaning he had not voluntarily switched. The Constitutional Court eventually sided with him, pointing out the lack of a decree officially removing his Malagasy nationality.

=== Case of Romy Voos Andrianarisoa ===
On 14 August 2023 the Director of Cabinet of President Andry Rajoelina, Romy Voos Andrianarisoa, was arrested in London under accusations of corruption in a London-based mining company. She was then dismissed by Rajoelina on 16 August. On a rally of the opposition in Antananarivo on November 13, Paraina August, one of the ten protester candidates and former speaker of the lower house of the Malagasy parliament, claimed that London would have emitted a summons letter to one of the running candidates without specifically mentioning a name. This claim was interpreted by the police as a public defamation, spread of fake news, and incitement to hatred. A few hours later, Paraina August was arrested at the international airport of Ivato and detained by the police for a couple of hours before finally being released.

=== Prohibition of an opposition meeting ===
On 5 September 2023 a meeting of the candidates of the opposition was prevented by the police.

=== Opposition boycott ===
The political opposition largely boycotted the elections.

== Results ==
Candidate	Party	Votes	%
Andry Rajoelina	Young Malagasies Determined	2,858,947	58.96
Siteny Randrianasoloniaiko	Fitambolagnela IAD–PSD–RPSD Vaovao–ABA	697,691	14.39
Marc Ravalomanana	Tiako i Madagasikara	586,282	12.09
Hery Rajaonarimampianina	New Force for Madagascar	251,144	5.18
Hajo Andrianainarivelo	Malagasy Miara-Miainga	91,832	1.89
Roland Ratsiraka	Malagasy Tonga Saina	76,858	1.59
Tahina Razafinjoelina	Firaisankinan'ny Tia Tanindrazana	76,553	1.58
Jean Brunelle Razafintsiandraofa	Antoko Politika Madio	63,474	1.31
Sendrison Daniela Raderanirina	Fandrosoa Faritsy iaby ho an'i Madagasikara	38,966	0.80
Lalaina Harilanto Ratsirahonanana	Antoko Fihavanantsika	32,608	0.67
Andry Tsiverizo Raobelina Andriamalala	Anjomara sy Rivo-baovao	30,198	0.62
Auguste Richard Paraina	Tsara Tahafina	29,874	0.62
Jean-Jacques Jedidia Ratsietison	Fahefa mividy no ilain'ny Malagasy	14,468	0.30
Total		4,848,895	100.00
Valid votes		4,848,895	94.72
Invalid/blank votes		270,123	5.28
Total votes		5,119,018	100.00
Registered voters/turnout		11,043,836	46.35
Source: HCC
