= List of presidents of the National Assembly of Madagascar =

List of presidents of the National Assembly of Madagascar.

Below is a list of presidents of the Constituent and Legislative Assembly:

Name	Took office	Left office	Notes
Norbert Zafimahova	16 October 1958	4 July 1959	

Below is a list of presidents of the National Assembly:

Name	Took office	Left office	Notes
Jules Ravony	4 July 1959	7 October 1960	
Calvin Tsiebo	7 October 1960	3 November 1960	
Alfred Nany	3 November 1960	1971	
Michel Fety	1972	1975	President of the National Council for Development
Lucien Xavier Michel Andrianarahinjaka	1977	1991	

Below is a list of co-presidents of the transitional Committee for Economic and Social Recovery:

Name	Took office	Left office	Notes
Richard Andriamanjato	31 October 1991	1993	
Manandafy Rakotonirina	31 October 1991	1993	

Below is a list of presidents of the National Assembly of Madagascar:

Name	Took office	Left office	Notes
Richard Andriamanjato	August 1993	1998	
Ange Andrianarisoa	June 1998	2002	
Auguste Paraina	March 2002	January 2003	
Jean Lahiniriko	January 2003	2007	
Samuel Mahafaritsy Rakatakaninina	April 2007	July 2007	
Jacques Sylla	24 October 2007	19 March 2009	
No legislature	April 2009	October 2010	
Andrianantoandro Raharinaivo	October 2010	18 February 2014	President of the Transitional lower house
Christine Razanamahasoa	18 February 2014	April 2014	
Jean Max Rakotomamonjy	3 May 2014	16 July 2019	
Christine Razanamahasoa	16 July 2019	12 July 2024	
Justin Tokely	12 July 2024	15 October 2025	
Siteny Randrianasoloniaiko	15 October 2025	Incumbent	

== See also ==
- National Assembly (Madagascar)
