= Isandra Mivoatsa =

Political party in Madagascar

Isandra Mivoatsa is a political party in Madagascar. In the 23 September 2007 National Assembly elections, the party won 1 out of 127 seats, namely the seat for Isandra that was won by Norovelomampionona Roberthine Rabetafika.
