= Yvan Randriasandratriniony =

Malagasy politician

Yvan Randriasandratriniony is a Malagasy politician. He served in the government of Madagascar as Minister of Agriculture, Breeding and Fishing from March 2002 to January 2004 and Minister of Decentralization and Regional Planning from January 2007 to April 2008. He became President of Tiako i Madagasikara (TIM), the ruling party, in October 2007, and he was President of the Senate of Madagascar from May 2008 to March 2009; he also served for a time as ambassador to South Africa.

== Life and career ==
Following the December 2001 presidential election, which opposition candidate Marc Ravalomanana claimed to have won, Ravalomanana declared himself President, and on 1 March 2002 he named a government, which included Randriasandratriniony as Minister of Agriculture, Breeding and Fishing. Randriasandratriniony remained in that position until he was replaced in the government named on 5 January 2004. On 30 June 2004, he became Madagascar's ambassador to South Africa.

Randriasandratriniony was appointed Minister at the Presidency for Decentralization and Regional Planning in the government named on 25 January 2007. He ranked second in the government, after Prime Minister Charles Rabemananjara.

In the September 2007 parliamentary election, Randriasandratriniony stood as the TIM candidate in the Fianarantsoa I constituency, which is considered an opposition stronghold. According to provisional results, he won with 37.7% of the vote; despite his victory, this was considered a relatively low score.

Randriasandratriniony became the Interim National President of TIM on 12 October 2007, succeeding Solofonantenaina Razoarimihaja. He retained his post as Minister at the Presidency for Decentralization and Regional Planning in the government appointed on 27 October 2007. As a TIM candidate, he was elected as a Senator from Haute Matsiatra region in the April 2008 Senate election; in this indirect election, he received unanimous support from the 89 electors. Randriasandratriniony was removed as Minister of Decentralization and Regional Planning in the government appointed on 30 April 2008. Subsequently, Randriasandratriniony was elected as President of the Senate on 6 May 2008; as the sole candidate, he received the unanimous support of the 33 Senators who voted, and he took office immediately after the vote. On this occasion, Randriasandratriniony described himself as "a man of dialogue" and said that he was "ready to listen, even to those who do not share my political beliefs".

He was officially elected as President of TIM on 21 May 2008, at the party's second national congress.

== Exil in the USA ==
Between 2009 and 2016 he lived in exile in the United States.
