= Solofonantenaina Razoarimihaja =

Malagasy politician

Solofonantenaina Razoarimihaja (26 December 1964 – 11 November 2020) was a Malagasy politician. He served in the National Assembly of Madagascar, and was elected in as a member of the Tiako I Madagasikara party in both Alaotra Mangoro and Analamanga. Razoarimihaja served as the president of TIM from 2002 to 2007. He represented the fifth constituency in Antananarivo as well.
