= Fampandrosoana Mirindra =

Political party in Madagascar

Fampandrosoana Mirindra is a political party in Madagascar. In the 23 September 2007 National Assembly elections, the party won 1 out of 127 seats.
