= Rindra Rabarinirinarison =

Malagasy politician

Rindra Hasimbelo Rabarinirinarison
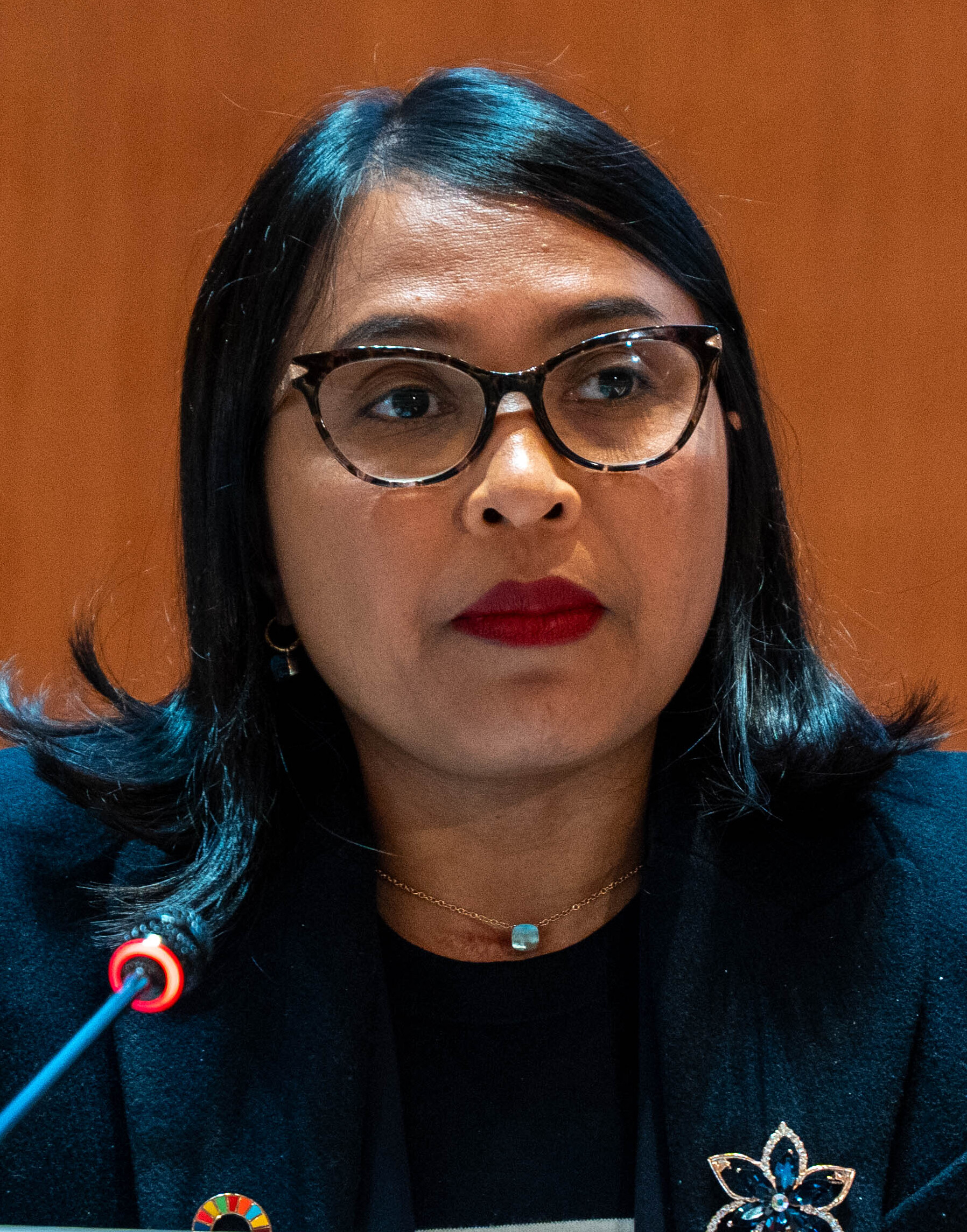
- Rabarinirinarison in 2025

CEO of the Global Center on Adaptation
- Incumbent
- Assumed office 16 March 2026
- Preceded by: Patrick Verkooijen

Minister of Economy and Finance
- In office 15 August 2021 – 28 October 2025
- President: Andry Rajoelina
- Prime Minister: Christian Ntsay
- Preceded by: Richard Randriamandrato
- Succeeded by: Herinjatovo Aimé Ramiarison

Rindra Hasimbelo Rabarinirinarison is a Malagasy jurist, politician, and public official who has been chief executive officer of the Global Center on Adaptation since March 2026. She previously was Minister of Economy and Finance in the government of Madagascar from August 2021 to October 2025.

== Early life and education ==
Rabarinirinarison studied public law and political science, specializing in international relations, and earned a diplôme d'études approfondies (DEA) jointly awarded by the Catholic University of Madagascar and the University of La Réunion. She also obtained a master's degree in political science and a university diploma in social sciences from the Catholic Institute of Madagascar.

In 2005, she obtained the diploma certifying aptitude for the functions of magistrate from Madagascar's National School for Magistrates and Court Clerks. In 2015, she was selected for the Mandela Washington Fellowship under the Young African Leaders Initiative, and later studied public management at Georgia State University and international public procurement at the International Law Institute in Washington, D.C.

== Career ==
=== Public service career ===
Rabarinirinarison worked for nearly ten years at Madagascar's National Commission for Public Procurement, and from 2016 was its national president. She later became secretary-general of the Ministry of Economy and Finance, where she oversaw implementation of state policy in economic, fiscal, budgetary, and financial management, coordinated partnerships with technical and financial partners, and took part in international negotiations. Since February 2020, she has also was Madagascar's alternate governor at the World Bank.

=== Minister of Economy and Finance ===
Andry Rajoelina appointed Rabarinirinarison as the Minister of Economy and Finance in August 2021. She succeeded Richard Randriamandrato and took office during a period still shaped by the effects of the COVID-19 pandemic in Madagascar. In late 2021, she presented the government's 2022 finance bill before the National Assembly.

She was reappointed in the cabinet reshuffles of January 2024 and August 2024.

During her tenure, Madagascar remained under successive International Monetary Fund programmes. IMF reviews in 2022 and 2023 described fiscal pressures linked to external shocks, transfers to state-owned utilities, and governance reform commitments, including procurement transparency measures and revisions to the mining code.

Under her leadership, the Malagasy economy grew by 4% in 2023, and a US$100 million Development Policy Operation agreement was made with the World Bank.

In June 2024, the IMF approved new arrangements for Madagascar under the Extended Credit Facility and the Resilience and Sustainability Facility, linking the programme to fiscal consolidation, governance reforms, and the gradual reduction of fuel subsidies. One of the best-documented policy measures of her tenure was a decree signed in May 2024 establishing an automatic mechanism for monthly adjustment of maximum pump fuel prices from 1 July 2024.

Rabarinirinarison also represented Madagascar in international climate-finance discussions. In 2024 she addressed a ministerial dialogue of the Vulnerable Twenty (V20), where she discussed the fiscal burden imposed on climate-vulnerable countries by repeated climate shocks. In late 2024, she publicly proposed the idea of a climate-related “blue bond” to help finance adaptation and resilience policies in Madagascar.

In February 2025, the IMF completed its first reviews under the new arrangements and announced an immediate disbursement of about US$101 million, while again emphasizing fuel-price reform and restructuring of the state electricity utility JIRAMA. In 2025, she also warned about the effects in Madagascar of the suspension of USAID programmes, stating that more than 100 projects were at risk. In June 2025, the World Bank announced a US$100 million Development Policy Operation for Madagascar focused on fiscal management and renewable energy, tied to reforms pursued during her tenure at the ministry.

Her tenure ended in October 2025, when a new cabinet appointed Herinjatovo Aimé Ramiarison as finance minister after the 2025 Malagasy coup d'état. Malagasy media later reported that she was absent from the handover ceremony because she had already left the country, with the ministry's secretary-general participating in the transfer of responsibilities on her behalf.

=== Global Center on Adaptation ===
In March 2026, Rabarinirinarison was appointed chief executive officer of the Global Center on Adaptation, succeeding Patrick Verkooijen. Her appointment came during a broader leadership transition at the organization, in which Ameenah Gurib-Fakim became Chair of the Supervisory Board. At the time of the transition, Dutch media reported that the Global Center on Adaptation was facing severe financial difficulties after funding from the Netherlands and the United Kingdom had ended, and that internal documents discussed possible layoffs and even closure if new funds were not secured.
