= Fatima Achimo =

Malagasy politician

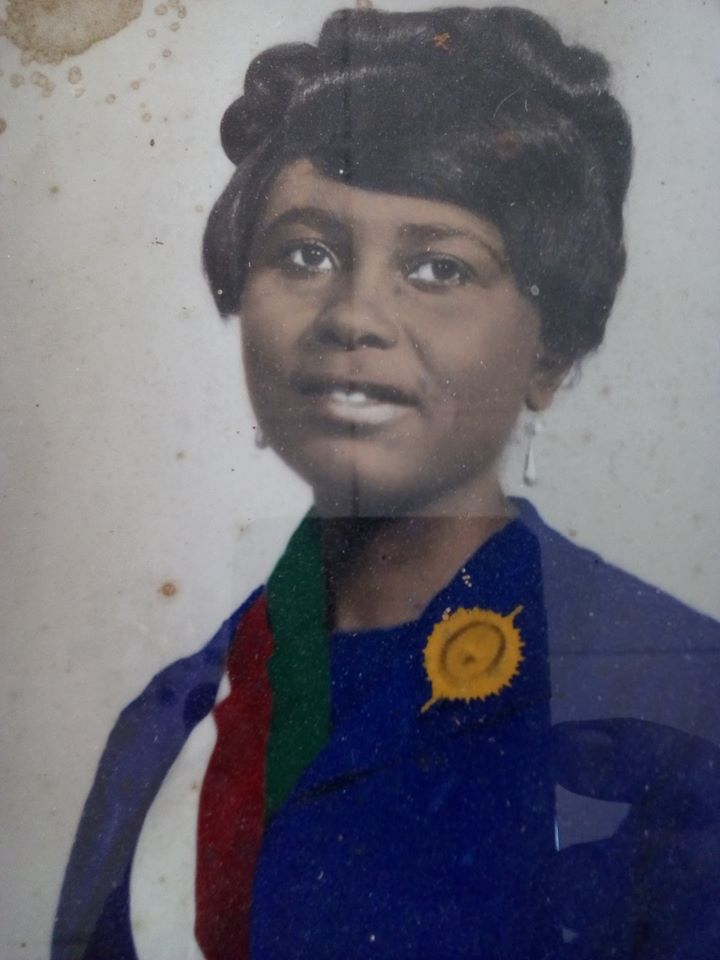
Fatima Achimo

Fatima Achimo (1931–2011) was a Malagasy politician. The daughter of a prince from the north of the country, she succeeded in earning her teaching diploma in 1963 and thereafter participated in international conventions on education. She later turned to politics. Representing the Social Democratic Party of Madagascar, she was the first woman to serve as a senator in Madagascar from September 1966. In 1971, she became secretary of state under President Philbert Tsiranana.

== Early life and education ==
Born in Ambanja on 8 January 1931, Fatima Achimo was the daughter of Prince Saïd Achimo of the Sakalave Bernazava dynasty and political governor of the Ambanja district. Raised in a traditional well-educated family, she was a brilliant pupil. Her father also acted as her instructor and mentor. In 1949, after receiving her Certificat du Second Degré (CSD), she went on to earn the Certificat d’Aptitude à l’Enseignement (Teaching Aptitude Diploma). In 1963, she completed her education at the Colonial School, Paris, where she qualified in Primary School Administration.

== Career ==
As an educator, she was active in the north covering the region between Nosy Be and Sambava. In 1964, she went to the United States for an internship in child nutrition and women's rights. She was behind the creation of the boarding facilities for girls at the high school in 1969.

Achimo took an interest in politics from the days of the First Republic. Recognized as an effective orator and successful negotiator, she became a supporter of Philibert Tsiranana. In 1960, she was appointed Commissioner General for the Protection of Children. On 5 September 1966, she became the first women to be elected to the Senate, representing the Social Democratic Party. She was appointed Deputy State Secretary of the government elected on 19 February 1071.

Fatima Achimo died in Antananarivo on 13 May 2011. In her honour, a street in Antsiranana was renamed Avenue Princesse Fatima Achimo the following October.
