= Max Fontaine =

Malagasy politician

Minister of the Environment and Sustainable Development
- In office 14 January 2024 – 29 September 2025
- President: Andry Rajoelina
- Prime Minister: Christian Ntsay
- Preceded by: Baomiavotse Vahinala Raharinirina
- Succeeded by: Rafanomezantsoa Michaël Manesimanana

Personal details
- Born: Fontaine Max Andonirina Noëli; 25 December 1995 (age 30) Antananarivo, Madagascar
- Party: Independent

Max Fontaine (born December 25, 1995, in Antananarivo, is a Malagasy entrepreneur and politician. He served as Minister of the Environment and Sustainable Development of Madagascar from January 14, 2024, to September 29, 2025, in the fourth and fifth governments of Christian Ntsay.

== Biography ==
Born to a French father and a Malagasy mother, Max Fontaine grew up in Madagascar and obtained his baccalaureate from the Lycée Français de Tananarive in 2013. He pursued his studies in business administration at HEC Montréal, in Canada, specializing in international business and applied economics.

In 2018, he founded the start-up Bôndy, active in the field of reforestation and agroforestry. The organization conducts tree planting campaigns, develops agroforestry models as well as mangrove restoration projects. In 2023, he was appointed Youth Climate Advocate by UNICEF.

He was appointed Minister of the Environment and Sustainable Development in January 2024, at the age of 28.

In 2025, in the wake of the protest movement that shook Madagascar, he was dismissed during the dissolution of the government on September 29, 2025.

== Criticisms and controversies ==
Initially perceived as committed to climate action, Max Fontaine was later criticized for aligning himself with economic interests deemed contrary to environmental priorities. He was notably accused of a lack of responsiveness and foresight in the face of ecological crises, particularly during the droughts and fires in Ranomafana National Park in the southeast of the country.

Furthermore, he was accused of inaction in the face of the rise in poaching and illegal wildlife trade, a phenomenon that reportedly increased significantly during his term.

=== Impact of Bondy on biodiversity ===
His company's reforestation activities have been criticized. The company plants monocultures of exotic species for reforestation which, according to Christian Kull, professor at the Institute of Geography and Sustainability at the University of Lausanne and an expert on Madagascar's ecosystem landscapes, "will not necessarily contribute to the conservation of native biodiversity and could not really be considered restoration, as they do not restore what existed before". Some species, such as Leucaena leucocephala, used by Bôndy, are listed by the IUCN as one of the 100 most invasive alien species in the world.

Reforestation can also disrupt natural non-forest ecosystems, such as those in the Malagasy Highlands, which were not historically covered by forests. Their conversion into tree plantations, often of exotic species, could harm biodiversity and water resources, while sometimes being less effective for carbon storage.

=== AR1 Highway Project ===
Max Fontaine's support for the controversial AR1 highway project, intended to connect Antananarivo to Toamasina, is also criticized. The opposition, civil society groups, and several NGOs denounce the lack of transparency in the bidding process, as well as the expropriations deemed brutal and the paltry compensation offered to communities living along the route. The project is also accused of threatening several national parks and sensitive agricultural areas. According to estimates reported by environmental organizations, the construction of this highway could lead to the destruction of a significant portion of the country's remaining primary forests (approximately 10%), further exacerbating the already fragile situation of local biodiversity.

=== Accusations of irregularities and conflict of interest ===
On March 30, 2026, an investigation by the independent Malagasy newspaper La Gazette de la Grande Île highlighted several irregularities and accused him of a conflict of interest benefiting his company, Bôndy, during his time as minister. According to an audit by the Ministry of Ecology, 342 million ariary (approximately €70,500) were allocated to a company for the construction of a waste treatment center, a project that never materialized. The same audit reported the disappearance of several official vehicles and spare parts from the ministry's garage. The newspaper also accused him of using official trips to promote his company. Finally, he was criticized for the opaque management of carbon credit funds, the benefits of which for local populations remained marginal.
