= National Wisa Association =

Political party in Madagascar

The National Wisa Association (Association Nationale Wisa) is a political party in the island of Madagascar. In the 23 September 2007 National Assembly elections, the party won 1 out of 127 seats.
