= Global Center on Adaptation =

Climate change organization

- Abbreviation: GCA
- Founded: 18 September 2018
- Founded at: Netherlands
- Type: International organization
- Purpose: Climate change adaptation
- Headquarters: Rotterdam, Netherlands
- CEO: Rindra Rabarinirinarison
- Chair: Ameenah Gurib-Fakim
- Website: gca.org

The Global Center on Adaptation (GCA) is an international organization focused on climate change adaptation. Hosted by the Netherlands, GCA engages in policy development, research, advocacy, and technical assistance to governments and the private sector. GCA's floating headquarters is hosted by the Netherlands in Rotterdam, with regional offices in Africa, South Asia, and Asia Pacific.

GCA is led by chief executive officer Rindra Rabarinirinarison and Chair of the Supervisory Board Ameenah Gurib-Fakim.

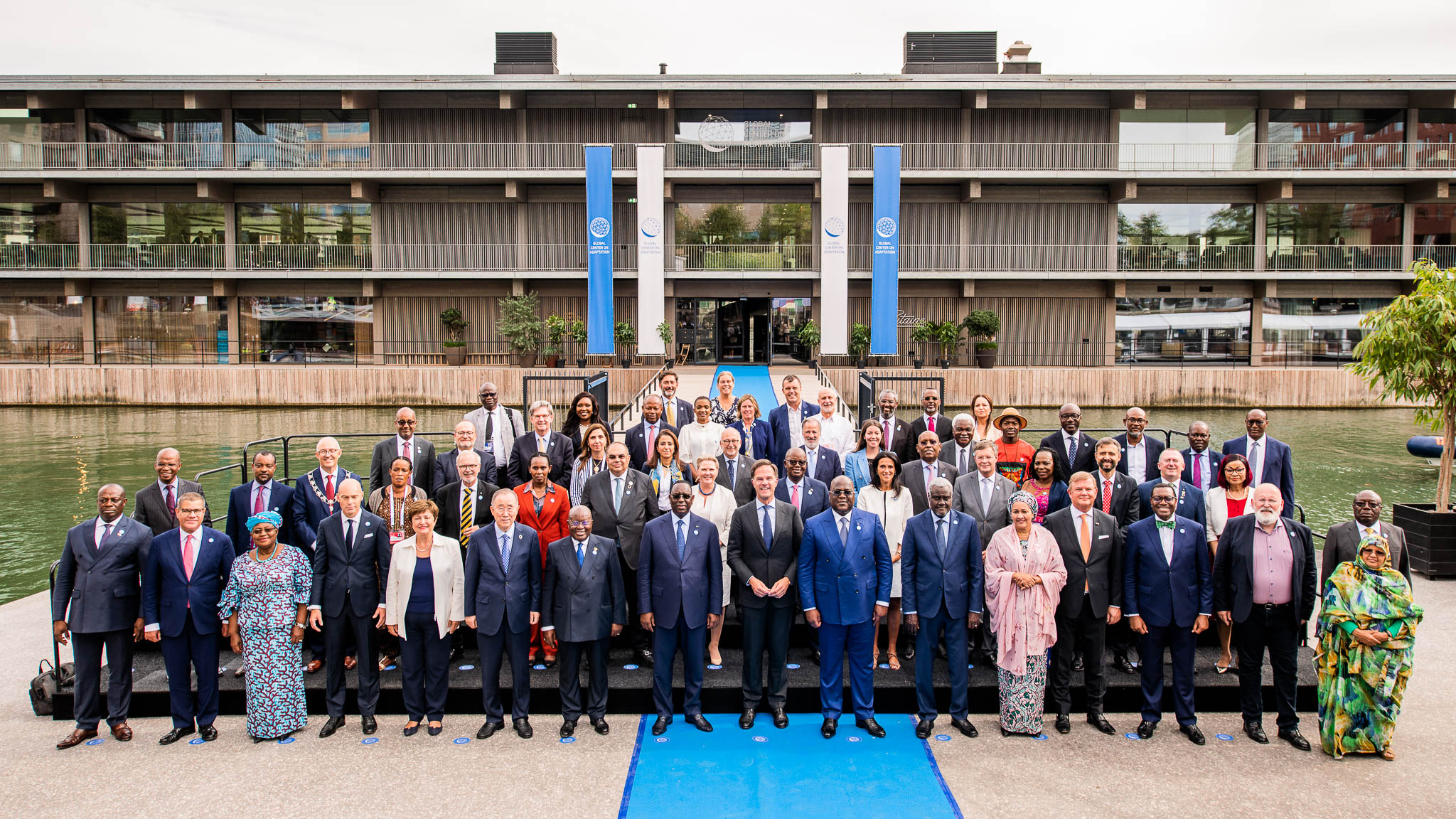
African leaders including the African Union and Climate Vulnerable Forum presidencies, and the leadership of the African Development Bank, gathered at the Global Center on Adaptation headquarters in Rotterdam on 5 September 2022 for the Africa Adaptation Summit.

GCA's flagship program, co-designed in partnership with the African Development Bank Group and endorsed by the African Union, is the Africa Adaptation Acceleration Program (AAAP).

== History ==
=== Global Centre of Excellence on Climate Adaptation ===
The Global Centre of Excellence on Climate Adaptation (GCECA) was founded by the Government of the Netherlands in partnership with the United Nations Environment Programme (UNEP), Japan's National Institute for Environmental Studies (NIES), and the Philippines.

Hosted in Groningen and Rotterdam, the centre was launched at COP23 in Bonn on 14 November 2017.

During COP23, the centre organised a side event titled What is Excellence in Climate Adaptation? and supported the launch of the UN Environment Adaptation Gap Report 2017: Towards Global Assessment.

On 18 September 2018, the Global Centre of Excellence on Climate Adaptation was renamed the Global Center on Adaptation, and Patrick Verkooijen became its chief executive officer.

=== Global Commission on Adaptation ===
The Global Commission on Adaptation was launched in The Hague on 16 October 2018. Established by Prime Minister Mark Rutte of the Netherlands and the leaders of 22 other convening countries, the Commission launched. The Commission was co-managed by GCA and the World Resources Institute. In 2019, at the UN Climate Action Summit, the Commission launched a Year of Action to implement the recommendations from Adapt Now and accelerate the necessary transitions for change. The Commissioners oversaw the development of the flagship report and guided the Year of Action. In January 2021, the Global Commission on Adaptation formally concluded at the Climate Adaptation Summit, hosted by the Dutch government. GCA is taking forward the work of the Commission through its Programs.

Secretary-General Ban Ki-moon, with co-chair of the Bill & Melinda Gates Foundation, Bill Gates, and Managing Director of the International Monetary Fund, Kristalina Georgieva, led the group.

=== GCA Floating Office Rotterdam ===
GCA's headquarters is in the largest floating office in the world, moored in the Rijnhaven in Rotterdam, the Netherlands. The floating office was inaugurated on 6 September 2021 by His Majesty King Willem-Alexander of the Netherlands.

== Controversies ==
In October of 2025 the Global Center on Adaptation was the subject of a major controversy involving fabricated and exaggerated results. Over a period of six months, NOS investigated the Global Center on Adaptation, speaking with more than seventy individuals involved both domestically and internationally. In addition, hundreds of documents were reviewed, finding and concluding that the GCA was taking credit for other people’s work. Not only did the GCA exaggerate its own contributions to projects, with GCA claiming to have initiated $25 billion in investments, which supposedly benefited more than 82.5 million people and created jobs for 900,000 people — all while operating on an annual budget of just €23 million, but it also claimed to be part of at least 18 World Bank projects — which it was not.The NOS spoke with more than twenty former employees of the GCA, revealing that CEO Patrick Verkooijen personally exerted pressure to exaggerate results in order to secure donor funding. Verkooijen also claimed that Norway and Denmark would be increasing their support for the GCA in the near future, despite both countries denying this.

In March 2026, the organization announced the conclusion of the tenures of founding chief executive officer Patrick V. Verkooijen and founding chair Ban Ki-moon, with Ban Ki-moon assuming the role of GCA Chair Emeritus. It also announced that Macky Sall would step down as Chair of the Supervisory Board and continue as honorary chair. On the same day, NOS reported that GCA was facing severe financial difficulties after the Netherlands and the United Kingdom stopped funding the organization. NOS reported that at least 20 of the organization's 65 employees faced possible dismissal, that internal documents discussed the possibility of closure if no short-term funding was secured, and that Verkooijen had announced his resignation in that context.
