= Bruno Rajaonson =

Malagasy politician

Bruno Rajaonson is a Malagasy politician. He was the deputy for Marovoay from 2003-2007.

He candidated in 2018 for the constituency of Marovoay for the National Assembly of Madagascar, though he obtained only 17.53% of votes. He was not elected in the 2019 Malagasy parliamentary election.
