= Union (Madagascar) =

Political party in Madagascar

Union (Malagasy: Tambatra) is a political party in Madagascar. The party's candidate Pety Rakotoniaina won 1.68% in the December 2006 presidential election. Since the 23 September 2007 National Assembly elections it is no longer represented in parliament
