= Norbert Zafimahova =

Malagasy politician

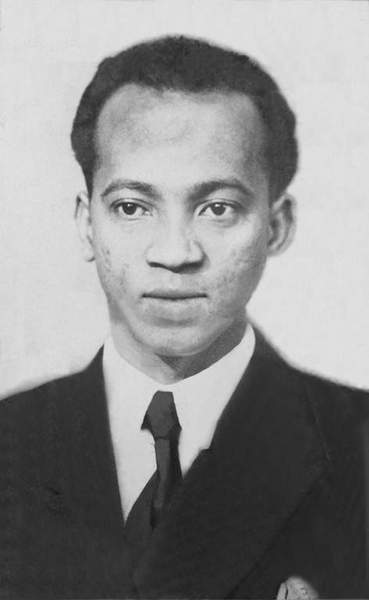

1st President of the National Assembly of Madagascar
- In office 16 October 1958 – 4 July 1959
- President: Philibert Tsiranana
- Succeeded by: Jules Ravony

Personal details
- Born: Norbert Zafimahova; 13 June 1913 Farafangana, French Madagascar
- Died: 3 April 1974 (aged 60)
- Party: PADESM; UDSM; USDM

Norbert Zafimahova (born 13 June 1913 in Farafangana, Madagascar; died 3 April 1974) was a politician from Madagascar who served in the French Senate from 1948–1958.

He was President of the Constituent and Legislative Assembly of Madagascar 1958–1959.
