= Communist Party (French Section of the Communist International) of the Region of Madagascar =

Communist Party (French Section of the Communist International) of the Region of Madagascar (French: Parti communiste (section francaise de l'Internationale communiste) de la Region du Madagascar) was formally constituted on August 12, 1936 at a meeting at L'Hôtel Glacier in Tananarive. The formal announcement of the formation of the party came after ten years of communist activity through different networks and four years of underground party activity. 180 person took part in the founding meeting. Paul Dussac was elected as the general secretary of the party. The party functioned as a section of the French Communist Party.

In September 1936 the newspaper La Nation malgache and changed its name to Le Prolétariat malgache, and on February 5, 1937 it was formally relaunched as the organ of PC(SFIC)RM. On January 23, 1937, a national bureau of the party was formed.

The party was dissolved in 1938.

== See also ==
- Malagasy Communist Party
