= Eloi Alphonse Maxime Dovo =

Malagasy diplomat and politician

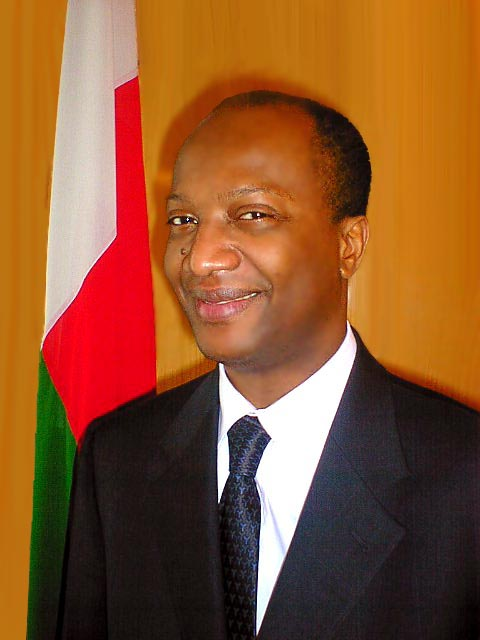
Eloi Maxime Alphonse Dovo, Ambassador of Madagascar to Russia, at the Malagasy Embassy in Moscow. Photo by Igor Sid, anthropologist and founder of the Russian Club of Friends of Madagascar. 25.04.2003.

Eloi Alphonse Maxime Dovo (born 1957?) is a Malagasy diplomat and politician. He was Ambassador of Madagascar to Russia from 2003 to 2018, and minister of Foreign Affairs since 11 June 2018 in the Christian Ntsay government.

== Biography ==
=== Education ===
In 1978, Eloi Alphonse Maxime Dovo got his Certificate of teacher of general education and a diploma in English. Starting in 1980, he was an English and French teacher in Madagascar. In 1986, he got a diploma in Russian and in International Relations, followed by a diploma in Management and International Economic Cooperation. In 1986–1987, he worked as an assistant in the School of law, economics and management of the University of Antananarivo.

=== Career ===
From 1987 to 1988, Eloi Alphonse Maxime Dovo started at the Minister of Foreign Affairs of Madagascar, heading the office of bilateral relations with Europe. In 1989, he was put in charge of the bilateral relations with the American continent. From 1991 to 1994, he became an official representative of the Ministry of Foreign Affairs.

From 1994 to 1997, Eloi Alphonse Maxime Dovo worked in the private sector as an authorized representative to the companies Labouffe, Socorex, and SoreTrans Gaship.

In 1997, he returned briefly to the Ministry of Foreign Affairs, before entering the Ministry of Justice as a non-permanent representative at the Seal Security Office.

In November 2002, after being the General Counselor to the Malagasy embassy in Paris, he was named ambassador to Russia. On 16 April 2003, Eloi Alphonse Maxime Dovo presented his credentials to Russian president Vladimir Putin, thus enacting his role as Ambassador of Madagascar to Russia.

On 11 June 2018, Eloi Alphonse Maxime Dovo became the Minister of Foreign Affairs of Madagascar in the Christian Ntsay government. Shortly thereafter, he participated for the first time to the African Union summit as head of foreign affairs of his country.

== Private life ==
Eloi Alphonse Maxime Dovo is married with two children.
