= Éliana Marie Bezaza =

Malagasy politician (born 1969)

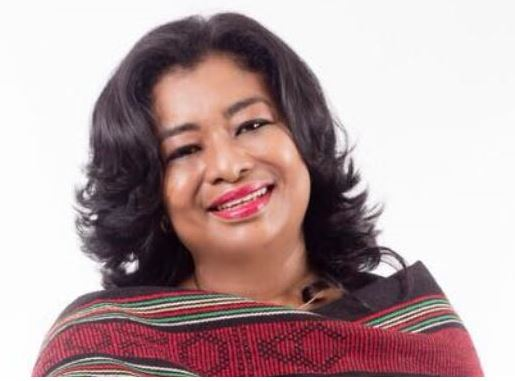
- Born: 6 April 1969 (age 57); Ambanja
- Occupation: politician
- Political party: Social Democratic Party of Madagascar
- Relatives: Philibert Tsiranana (grandfather)

Éliana Marie Bezaza (born 6 April 1969) is a Malagasy politician. She has been the President and the national secretary of the Social Democratic Party of Madagascar. She was their unsuccessful candidate for the 2018 Malagasy presidential election.

== Life ==
Bezaza was born in 1969 in Ambanja. She is the grandchild of Philibert Tsiranana who was President of Madagascar for twelve years from 1959 to 1972. Her mother was his eldest child. She was educated in Madagascar, Germany and France and she speaks Malagasy, English, German, French and Chinese.

She was the President of the Social Democratic Party of Madagascar in 2017 when she announced that she intended to contest the 2018 Malagasy presidential election. She made the announcement in the northern port city of Antsiranana.

In 2021 she was the national secretary of her party that was trying to support the party that had been elected in October 2020, but they were disappointed with their performance. There had been talk of a new university in Anahidrano but there were no signs of its creation. She was complaining that access to the national media was difficult for the government's critics.

A code of conduct was developed in order to encourage a better electoral process in Madagascar. By July 2023 fifteen political parties had agreed to its guidelines. Four early signaries were former President Marc Ravalomanana, Sendrison Daniela Raderanirina, Faniry Alban Raderanirina and Bezaza on behalf of her party.

== Private life ==
Bezaza is married and they have two children.
