= Mayors' Association =

Political party in Madagascar

The Mayors' Association (Association de Maires) is a political party in Madagascar. In the 23 September 2007 National Assembly elections, the party won 1 out of 127 seats.
