= Elections in Madagascar =

Madagascar elects on the national level a head of state – the president – and a legislature. The president is elected for a five-year term by the people, by absolute majority through a two-round system. The Parliament has two chambers. The National Assembly (Antenimieram-Pirenena/Assemblée Nationale) has 151 members, elected for a five-year term in single-member and two-member constituencies. In single-member constituencies, representatives are elected by simple majority, in the two-member constituencies, closed party lists are used, with the two seats distributed using a highest averages method. The Senate (Sénat) has 33 members, 22 members elected by the regions by provincial electors, and 11 members appointed by the president, all for 5 year terms.

== Local elections ==
The electors of Madagascar went to the polls on Friday, 31 July 2015 to choose the local government officials to take charge for the next four years. Over 8,484,714 people were expected to cast their ballots at some 20,072 polling stations, according to the national elections agency. Some 7,322 candidates were competing for the 1,695 seats.

== 2001 Malagasy presidential election ==
Elected president: Marc Ravalomanana

== 2006 Malagasy presidential election ==
Elected president: Marc Ravalomanana

== 2013 Malagasy general election ==
Elected president: Hery Rajaonarimampianina

=== 2018 presidential election ===
Elected president: Andry Rajoelina

== See also ==
- Electoral calendar
- Electoral system
