= Malagasy Communist Party =

Malagasy Communist Party (French: Parti Communiste Malgache) was a communist party in Madagascar. PCM was formed in 1958 and its First Secretary was René Anselme Randrianja. It held its first party congress in Antananarivo March 18-March 20, 1960.

It appears that the PCM had been founded without being endorsed by either the French Communist Party or the Communist Party of the Soviet Union. Randrianja travelled to Moscow in 1960 to seek recognition, but was not invited to participate in the international conference of communist parties held there. Afterwards he travelled to China, where he was received by the Chinese communists. During the Sino-Soviet split, PCM sided with China. It was however rapidly eclipsed by the pro-Soviet AKFM.

The PCM published a forthnighly organ, Ady Farany in Malagasy language. R. Ratsimazda was the editor of the publication. Between 1958 and April 1, 1966, 235 issues were published.
