= 2024 Malagasy parliamentary election =

- 29 May 2024
- All 163 seats in the National Assembly; 82 seats needed for a majority
- Turnout: 46.78%
| Party | Leader | Vote % | Seats | +/– |
|---|---|---|---|---|
| IRMAR | Andry Rajoelina | 41.75 | 84 | 0 |
| Firaisankina | Marc Ravalomanana | 14.90 | 22 | +6 |
| FIVOI | | 2.40 | 4 | +4 |
| Kôlektifa | | 1.97 | 1 | +1 |
| Green | Alexandre Marie Georget | 0.67 | 1 | +1 |
| GJMP | | 0.34 | 1 | 0 |
| Independents | – | 37.56 | 50 | +4 |
This lists parties that won seats. See the complete results below.
Results by constituency
| Prime Minister before | Prime Minister after |
|---|---|
| Christian Ntsay; Independent | Christian Ntsay; Independent |

Parliamentary elections were held in Madagascar on 29 May 2024 to elect the 163 members of the National Assembly. The election took place a few months after Andry Rajoelina was re-elected in the November 2023 presidential elections, which were marked by low turnout and an opposition boycott.

The ruling Young Malagasies Determined, in coalition with Together with President Andry Rajoelina (IRMAR), remained the largest bloc in the National Assembly. According to preliminary results, the coalition initially lost its majority. However, after appeals to the High Constitutional Court, the coalition regained four previously lost seats, securing 84 seats, which allowed it to maintain its majority in the new legislature. Rajoelina then appointed Christian Ntsay as president, eventually forming the Fifth Ntsay Government.

The opposition coalition Firaisankina, led by Marc Ravalomanana, won 22 seats, an increase of six compared to the previous election. Smaller parties including FIVOI and Kôlektifa also secured seats, while independent candidates made a strong showing, winning 50 seats.

== Electoral system ==
The 163 members of the National Assembly are elected via a parallel voting system: 77 seats are elected in single-member constituencies by first-past-the-post voting, while the remaining 86 seats are elected in 43 multi-member constituencies (of two seats each) by closed list proportional representation using the highest averages method.

For this election, 12 million people are eligible to vote. More than 450 candidates contested the election.

== Campaign issues ==
Issues in the campaign included corruption, infrastructure and the economy.

== Conduct ==
Voting was held from 06:00 to 17:00 on 29 May. Observers from the African Union and the Southern African Development Community monitored the proceedings. The election was overseen by the Independent National Electoral Commission (CENI). There was increased security. On 1 June, the Safidy Observatory, the country's largest election monitoring group, raised doubts on the neutrality, impartiality and independence of CENI in its conduct of the vote. The release of the provisional results by CENI was initially scheduled to take place on 8 June, but was postponed to 11 June.

== Results ==
On 11 June, CENI published the provisional results showing no clear majority. The pro-regime coalition IRMAR (Isika Rehetra Miaraka amin'ny Andry Rajoelina, All together with Andry Rajoelina) lost its majority and won 80 seats, while independents and the opposition party Firaisankina won 55 and 22 seats respectively. Other small parties such as FIVOI received four seats while the Kolektifan'ny Malagasy and Antoko Maitso hasin'i Madagasikara received one seat each. Turnout was estimated at 47%. Results from 122 polling stations were not included because fires destroyed voting materials on 31 May.

The final results were announced by the High Constitutional Court on 28 June.

| Party | Votes | % | Seats | +/– |
|---|---|---|---|---|
| Together with President Andry Rajoelina | 2,184,887 | 41.75 | 84 | 0 |
| Firaisankina | 779,500 | 14.90 | 22 | +9 |
| Fiovana Ivoaran'ny eny Ifotony | 125,431 | 2.40 | 4 | +4 |
| Kôlektifa an'ny Malagasy | 103,144 | 1.97 | 1 | 0 |
| Madagascar Green Party | 34,932 | 0.67 | 1 | +1 |
| Groupe des Jeunes Malgaches Patriotiques | 17,708 | 0.34 | 1 | 0 |
| Vonjy Iray Tsy Mivaky | 4,909 | 0.09 | 0 | 0 |
| Manaranara Fanilo | 3,766 | 0.07 | 0 | 0 |
| Malagasy Revolutionary Party | 3,264 | 0.06 | 0 | 0 |
| Fanorolahy | 2,849 | 0.05 | 0 | 0 |
| Fandrosoa Faritsy iaby ho an'i Madagasikara | 2,456 | 0.05 | 0 | 0 |
| LEADER-Fanilo | 2,410 | 0.05 | 0 | 0 |
| Otrikafo | 2,067 | 0.04 | 0 | 0 |
| MTM | 281 | 0.01 | 0 | 0 |
| Independents | 1,965,687 | 37.56 | 50 | +4 |
| Total | 5,233,291 | 100.00 | 163 | – |
| Valid votes | 5,233,291 | 96.74 | | |
| Invalid/blank votes | 176,206 | 3.26 | | |
| Total votes | 5,409,497 | 100.00 | | |
| Registered voters/turnout | 11,564,089 | 46.78 | | |
Source: CENI, HCC

== Reactions ==
Opposition leader and former president Marc Ravalomanana accused Tanora Malagasy Vonona, the ruling party of his successor, Andry Rajoelina, of violations and fraud.
