= Rebirth of the Social Democratic Party =

Political party in Madagascar

- President: Benja Urbain Andriantsizehena
- Founded: 1993
- Ideology: Social democracy

The Rebirth of the Social Democratic Party (French: Rénaissance du Parti Social-Démocratique, RPSD) is a political party in Madagascar. At the legislative elections, 15 December 2002, the party won 2.0% of the popular vote and 5 out of 160 seats. Since the May 2019 National Assembly elections, it is only represented by one member in parliament, Jean Eugene Voninahitsy.

== Divisions ==
This party was formed from a division of the former PSD (Social Democratic Party of Madagascar), the first party that was in power in Madagascar before the 1972 revolution. This party was reborn as the RPSD, PFDM and RPSD Vaovao.

Pierre Tsiranana, founded the PFDM (Parti Fort Democrate de Madagascar) after having demissed from RPSD in 1996.

Jean Eugène Voninahitsy founded the RPSD Vaovao in 2001 because of incompatibility with the then leader of RPSD, Marson Evariste.
