= Young Malagasies Determined =

Political party in Madagascar

Young Malagasies Determined Tanora Malagasy Vonona
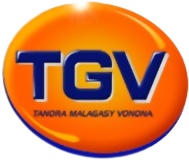
- Abbreviation: TGV
- Leader: Andry Rajoelina
- Founder: Andry Rajoelina
- Founded: 2007
- Headquarters: Antananarivo
- Ideology: Social democracy
- Political position: Centre-left
- National Assembly: 84 / 151

Young Malagasies Determined (Malagasy: Tanora Malagasy Vonona, TGV), sometimes translated as Determined Malagasy Youth or Ready Young Malagasies, is a political movement and party in Madagascar. It is headed by the former President, Andry Rajoelina, who organized it prior to the Antananarivo mayoral election in 2007.

The term TGV is also a reference to Andry Rajoelina's nickname, a reference to the French high-speed train TGV and to Rajoelina's fast-mover's personality.

Politically, TGV states that it promotes government transparency, the development of infrastructure, and multigenerational politics. It is the main centre-left rival of the centre-right Tiako I Madagasikara, and currently holds a majority in the National Assembly.

It was part of the coalition Together with President Andry Rajoelina (Isika Rehetra Miaraka amin’i Andry Rajoelina, or IRD) for the 2019 Malagasy parliamentary election. In the 2023 Malagasy presidential election and 2024 Malagasy parliamentary election it was referred to as 'IRMAR' (Isika Rehetra Miaraka Amin’i Andry Rajoelina).

== Election results ==
=== Presidential ===
Election	Candidate	1st round		2nd round		Results
Election	Candidate	#	%	#	%	Results
2013	Supported Hery Rajaonarimampianina					Elected ✓
2018	Andry Rajoelina	1,954,023	39.23%	2,586,938	55.66%	Elected ✓
2023	Andry Rajoelina	2,858,947	58.96%	—N/a		Elected ✓

=== National Assembly ===
Election	Leader	Votes	%	Seats	+/–	Position	Government
2013	Andry Rajoelina	669,394	17.30%	49 / 151	New	1st	Majority Coalition
2019	Andry Rajoelina	1,402,480	34.77%	84 / 151	▲35	1st	Majority Government
2024	Andry Rajoelina	2,184,887	40.39%	84 / 163	Steady	1st	Majority Government
