= 2002 Malagasy parliamentary election =

Parliamentary elections were held in Madagascar on 15 December 2002. They were won by the Tiako i Madagasikara party of President Marc Ravalomanana, which took 103 of the 160 seats. Voter turnout was 67.86% of the 5,844,564 registered voters.

== Results ==
Party	Votes	%	Seats	+/–
Tiako i Madagasikara	1,325,743	34.30	103	New
National Union	339,599	8.79	22	New
Vanguard of the Malagasy Revolution	189,539	4.90	3	–60
Economic Liberalism and Democratic Action for National Recovery	126,789	3.28	2	–14
Rebirth of the Social Democratic Party	75,896	1.96	5	New
Toamasina Tonga Saina			2	New
United Popular Forces			1	New
Independents			22	–10
Total			160	+10
Valid votes	3,865,256	97.45		
Invalid/blank votes	101,031	2.55		
Total votes	3,966,287	100.00		
Registered voters/turnout	5,844,564	67.86		
Source: EISA
