= 2019 Malagasy parliamentary election =

- 27 May 2019
- All 151 seats in the National Assembly; 76 seats needed for a majority
- Turnout: 40.98%
Party	Leader	Vote %	Seats
TGV	Andry Rajoelina	34.77	84
TIM	Marc Ravalomanana	10.80	16
MA.TI.TA.		1.20	1
MTS		0.46	1
GJMP		0.36	1
MDM		0.24	1
RPSD Vaovao		0.07	1
Independents	–	44.89	46
This lists parties that won seats. See the complete results below.
Prime Minister before	Prime Minister after
Christian Ntsay; Independent	Christian Ntsay; Independent

Parliamentary elections were held in Madagascar on 27 May 2019 to elect the 151 members of the National Assembly. They followed presidential elections held in November and December 2018, which saw Andry Rajoelina return to power as President of Madagascar after defeating Marc Ravalomanana in a runoff.

The result was a decisive victory for Young Malagasies Determined, which won 84 of the 151 seats, allowing them to form a majority government, replacing the previous coalition government formed after the previous elections. The opposition party Tiako i Madagasikara (TIM), led by Marc Ravalomanana won 16 seats, while five small parties secured one seat each. Independent candidates also performed strongly, winning 46 seats.

== Electoral system ==
The 151 members of the National Assembly were elected by two methods; 87 were elected from single-member constituencies by first-past-the-post voting, with the remaining 64 elected from 32 two-seat constituencies.

== Results ==
Party	Votes	%	Seats
Isika Rehetra Miaraka amin'i Andry Rajoelina	1,402,480	34.77	84
Tiako i Madagasikara	435,740	10.80	16
Malagasy Tia Tanindrazana	48,477	1.20	1
Banjino ny Repoblika	33,363	0.83	0
Leader-FANILO	26,030	0.65	0
Ainga Lavitra Ezaka ho an'ny Fanovana	22,716	0.56	0
Dina Iombonan-Kevitra	20,889	0.52	0
Antokom-Bahoaka Malagasy	18,727	0.46	0
Malagasy Tonga Saina	18,582	0.46	1
Total Refoundation of Madagascar	18,542	0.46	0
Association for the Rebirth of Madagascar	16,248	0.40	0
National Union for the Refoundation and Reconstruction of Madagascar	15,801	0.39	0
Social Democratic Party of Madagascar	15,267	0.38	0
Tanora Maroantsetra Miray	15,098	0.37	0
Group of Young Malagasy Patriots	14,392	0.36	1
Madagasikara Vina sy Fanantenana	11,245	0.28	0
Antoka sy Dinan’ny Nosy	11,008	0.27	0
Fitambolagnela - Identité, Ambition, Developpement	10,411	0.26	0
Movement for Democracy in Madagascar	9,863	0.24	1
Fiovana Ivoaran'ny eny Ifotony	7,824	0.19	0
Liberal Group of Madagascar	7,687	0.19	0
Madagascar for the Malagasy	7,194	0.18	0
Congress Party for the Independence of Madagascar	5,988	0.15	0
Gasy Mifankatia	4,301	0.11	0
Rebirth of the Social Democratic Party	4,023	0.10	0
Fihavanan Avaradrano Mandroso	3,106	0.08	0
Malagasy Labour Party	2,863	0.07	0
RPSD Vaovao	2,809	0.07	1
Adhem Fizafa	2,807	0.07	0
Ampela Manao Politika	1,518	0.04	0
Vondron'ny Tia Tanindrazana	1,428	0.04	0
Tanora Malagasy Miroso	996	0.02	0
Gasikara Antsika Rehetra	846	0.02	0
Antoky ny Fivoran'ny Malagasy	842	0.02	0
Fahazavan'i Madagasikara	829	0.02	0
Vonona sy Vanona Isika	801	0.02	0
Tambatra	768	0.02	0
FMI Malagasy	476	0.01	0
Tafajiaby	452	0.01	0
Antoky ny Hoavin'i Madagasikara	250	0.01	0
Independents	1,810,694	44.89	46
Total	4,033,381	100.00	151
Valid votes	4,034,129	96.36	
Invalid/blank votes	152,598	3.64	
Total votes	4,186,727	100.00	
Registered voters/turnout	10,215,267	40.98	
Source: HCC
