= 2007 Malagasy parliamentary election =

Parliamentary elections were held in Madagascar on 23 September 2007, with the vote to be repeated in two constituencies on 14 November 2007. 637 candidates contested the election, in which the 127 seats in the National Assembly were at stake.

== Background ==
In Toliara Province on 20 July 2007, President Marc Ravalomanana announced he would soon dissolve the National Assembly, leading to an early parliamentary election. Speaking to the press on July 24, Ravalomanana cited the need to adapt to the situation under the constitutional changes passed earlier this year as grounds for dissolving parliament before the end of its term in May 2008. The decision was finally announced on 26 July 2007 after a Council of Ministers meeting; the ministers had agreed to reduce the number of parliamentarians from 160 to 127 to be elected in the 119 districts of Madagascar across the country.

== Campaign ==
All candidacies had to be submitted by August 14. The High Constitutional Court released its official list of 1,542 validated candidates on August 23. The ruling Tiako i Madagasikara (TIM) was the only party with candidates in all constituencies; these candidates included only about a fifth of the TIM deputies in the previous National Assembly. About 20 of the deputies not nominated by TIM as candidates ran as independents instead; TIM President Razoarimihaja Solofonantenaina described them as "not serious challengers". Seven ministers in the government were nominated as TIM candidates: Yvan Randriasandratriniony, Minister near the Presidency in charge of Decentralization, in Fianarantsoa I; Koto Bernard, Minister of the Environment, in Ifanadiana; Robinson Jean Louis, Minister of Health, in Alaotra-Mangoro; Patrick Ramiaramanana, Minister of Energy, in Antananarivo I; Andriamparany Radavidson, Minister of Finance, in Antananarivo IV; Donat Olivier Andriamahefamparany, Minister of Mines, in Antananarivo V; and Harifidy Ramilison, Deputy Minister of Agriculture, in Fort-Dauphin. Many criticized the candidacies of these ministers because they were expected to remain in the government after the election, leaving their National Assembly seats to their substitutes. Another notable TIM candidate was former Prime Minister Jacques Sylla on Île Sainte-Marie.

An alliance of opposition parties agreed to nominate a single candidate for each constituency, but although they reached a consensus on single candidates in some constituencies, in most cases they did not. One notable opposition candidate is Jean Lahiniriko, who was elected as a TIM candidate in the December 2002 parliamentary election and became President of the National Assembly before having a falling out with the ruling party and running against Ravalomanana in the December 2006 presidential election. He stood as a candidate in the parliamentary election for his new party, the Socialist and Democratic Party for the Unity of Madagascar (PSDUM), in the Betioky South constituency.

The former ruling party AREMA was divided on whether to contest the election. The faction of the party associated with former president Didier Ratsiraka chose not to participate, unlike the faction associated with Pierrot Rajaonarivelo. The Ratsiraka faction sought to prevent the Rajaonarivelo faction's participation, but on August 23 the High Constitutional Court ruled that it could participate.

The election campaign began on September 8 and continued for two weeks.

There were about 7.5 million registered voters in this election and 17,586 polling stations across the country.

== Conduct ==
Observers from the Common Market for Eastern and Southern Africa (COMESA) and the African Union gave a positive appraisal of the election.

Voter turnout was low, particularly in urban areas; in some of the Antananarivo constituencies it was as low as 20%, and there were similarly low numbers in some other cities.

== Results ==
Provisional results on September 24 showed TIM winning all six of the constituencies in Antananarivo, the capital, where each constituency is represented by two deputies. In the city of Toamasina, considered an opposition stronghold, TIM candidate Pierrot Botozaza was victorious. TIM also won in the cities of Fianarantsoa and Antsiranana, but in one of the main cities it suffered a defeat, with its candidate losing to an independent candidate, Harinjatovo Rakotondramanana ("Hary Kalizy"), in the Mahajanga I constituency.

Complete provisional results were released by the Ministry of the Interior and Administrative Reform on September 28. These results showed TIM winning 106 of the 127 seats; the remaining seats were won by independent candidates or regional parties, except for that of Befandriana-Avaratra constituency, which was won by LEADER-Fanilo candidate Jonah Parfait Prezaly, and that of Benenitra constituency, which was won by Liaraike candidate Gaston Rakotobezanahary.

The High Constitutional Court confirmed the results on October 13, making them official. It annulled the election in two constituencies, Bealanana and Mananara Avaratra, requiring the election to be held over again there. In Bealanana, TIM candidate Julien Ramanandray had won with 42.90% of the vote according to the provisional results, while in Mananara Avaratra, opposition independent candidate Boniface Zakahely had won with 44.68% of the vote according to the provisional results. Zakahely said that the government was trying to keep him out of the National Assembly, but he vowed to win the revote regardless. He was sentenced to 30 months in prison for assault and battery by the Court of Appeal of Toamasina on November 7. The vote was repeated in the two annulled constituencies on 14 November 2007.

Party	Seats
Tiako i Madagasikara	105
Fanjava Velogno	2
Economic Liberalism and Democratic Action for National Recovery	1
Brun-Ly	1
Fampandrosoana Mirindra	1
Isandra Mivoatsa	1
Liaraike	1
Mayors' Association	1
National Wisa Association	1
Vohibato Tapa-kevitsa	1
Antoko Miombona Ezaka	0
Independents	10
Vacant	2
Total	127
Source: HCC

== Aftermath ==
The new National Assembly began sitting on October 23, having been delayed by one week. When the new session of the National Assembly began, Jacques Sylla was elected as the President of the National Assembly; he was the only candidate and received 123 votes from the 124 participating deputies. Ravalomanana named a new government on October 27. Ministers Donat Andriamahefamparany and Koto Bernard, who were elected to the National Assembly, left their posts; Deputy Minister Harifidy Ramilison, the only one of the seven ministers running in the election to be defeated, was also excluded from the government on this occasion.

On November 21, the High Constitutional Court announced the final results of the partial election: in Mananara Avaratra, Boniface Zakahely won again in the rerun with 62.75% of the vote, while in Bealanana, TIM was defeated by Antoko Miombona Ezaka candidate Lazafeno, who won 52.61% of the vote. The Court ordered candidates who received at least 10% of the vote to be compensated for the expense of printing ballot papers.
