= Tiako i Madagasikara =

Political party in Madagascar

I Love Madagascar Tiako i Madagasikara
- President: Marc Ravalomanana
- Secretary-General: Rina Andriamasinoro
- Founded: July 3, 2002
- Headquarters: 0034 A II, Lalana Pastora Rabeony Hans, Antananarivo, Madagascar
- Ideology: Liberal conservatism Populism; Economic liberalism
- Political position: Centre-right
- National Assembly: 22 / 163

Website
- http://www.tim-madagascar.org/

Tiako i Madagasikara (TIM, lit. 'I Love Madagascar'; French: J'aime Madagascar) is a political party in Madagascar founded on July 3, 2002, to support President Marc Ravalomanana. After the parliamentary election held on September 23, 2007, it was the largest party in the National Assembly of Madagascar, with 106 out of 127 seats. The party is located in MAGRO Ankorondrano, Antananarivo. Ravalomanana was re-elected with 55.79% of the vote in the December 2006 presidential election.

Solofonantenaina Razoarimihaja was the President of TIM from 2002 to 2007. On October 12, 2007, he was succeeded by Yvan Randriasandratriniony, who became the Interim National President. Randriasandratriniony was officially elected as President of TIM on May 21, 2008, at the party's second national congress. Rina Randriamasinoro was the party's Secretary-General in 2023.

Ravalomanana led his personal movement in the 2013, 2018, and 2023 presidential elections.

== Election results ==
=== Presidential elections ===
Election	Candidate	1st round		2nd round		Results
Election	Candidate	#	%	#	%	Results
2001	Marc Ravalomanana	2,306,600	51.46%	—N/a		Elected ✓
2006	Marc Ravalomanana	2,435,199	54.79%	—N/a		Elected ✓
2013	Jean Louis Robinson (Note: Supported AVANA's candidate Jean Louis Robinson.)	955,534	21.10%	1,791,336	46.51%	Lost ✗
2018	Marc Ravalomanana	1,760,837	35.35%	2,060,847	44.34%	Lost ✗
2023	Marc Ravalomanana	586,282	12.09%	—N/a		Lost ✗

=== National Assembly elections ===
Election	Leader	Votes	%	Seats	+/–	Position	Government
2002	Marc Ravalomanana	1,325,743	34.30%	103 / 160	New	▲1st	Supermajority government
2007	Marc Ravalomanana			105 / 127	▲2	1st	Supermajority government
2013	Marc Ravalomanana	416,732	10.77%	20 / 151	▼85	2nd	Opposition
2019	Marc Ravalomanana	435,740	10.80%	16 / 151	▼14	2nd	Opposition
2024	Marc Ravalomanana	768,779	14.21%	22 / 163	▲6	2nd	Opposition
