= National Assembly (Madagascar) =

Lower house of the Parliament of Madagascar

Coordinates: 18.9344°S 47.5273°E

National Assembly Antenimierampirenena (Malagasy) Assemblée Nationale (French)

Type
- Type: Unicameral (1975–1993) (2025–present) Lower house (1958–1975) (1993–2025)

History
- Founded: 1958

Leadership
- President: Siteny Randrianasoloniaiko, PSD since 15 October 2025

Structure
- Seats: 163
- Political groups: IRMAR (84); Independent (50); FIR (22); FIVOI (4); KOL (1); AMHM (1); GYMP (1)
- Length of term: 5 years

Elections
- Voting system: Parallel voting
- Last election: 29 May 2024
- Next election: 2029

Meeting place
- Tsimbazaza Palace, Antananarivo

Website
- www.assemblee-nationale.mg/

The National Assembly (Malagasy: Antenimieram-Pirenena; French: Assemblée Nationale) is the lower house of the Parliament of Madagascar. The Assembly has 163 members, elected for five-year terms in single-member and two-member constituencies.

The Parliament of Madagascar has two chambers. The other chamber is the Senate (Antenimieran-Doholona/Sénat), which has 18 members, 12 of which are indirectly elected (one from each district of Madagascar), with 6 more being appointed.

== See also ==
- List of presidents of the National Assembly of Madagascar
