= Politics of Madagascar =

The politics of Madagascar take place in a framework of a semi-presidential representative democratic republic, with a pluralist multi-party system. The President of Madagascar is head of state and the Prime Minister of Madagascar is head of government. Executive power is exercised by the government. Legislative power is vested in both the government and the bicameral parliament, which is composed of the Senate and the National Assembly. The Judiciary is independent of the executive and the legislature.

== Political history ==
Madagascar's first President, Philibert Tsiranana, was elected when his Social Democratic Party gained power at independence in 1960 and was reelected without opposition in March 1972. However, he resigned only 2 months later in response to massive anti-government demonstrations. The unrest continued, and Tsiranana's successor, Gen. Gabriel Ramanantsoa, resigned on 5 February 1975, handing over executive power to Lt. Col. Richard Ratsimandrava, who was assassinated 6 days later. A provisional military directorate then ruled until a new government was formed in June 1975, under Didier Ratsiraka.

During the 16 subsequent years of President Ratsiraka's rule, Madagascar continued under a government committed to revolutionary socialism based on the 1975 Constitution establishing a highly centralized state. During this period a strategy of nationalization of private enterprises, centralization of the economy and "Malgasization" of the education system crippled the economy, leaving traces even today of a highly centralized economic system and a high level of illiteracy. National elections in 1982 and 1989 returned Ratsiraka for a second and third 7-year presidential term. For much of this period, only limited and restrained political opposition was tolerated, with no direct criticism of the president permitted in the press.

With an easing of restrictions on political expression, beginning in the late 1980s, the Ratsiraka regime came under increasing pressure to make fundamental changes. In response to a deteriorating economy, Ratsiraka relaxed socialist economic policies and instituted some liberal, private-sector reforms. These, along with political reforms like the elimination of press censorship in 1989 and the formation of more political parties in 1990, were insufficient to placate a growing opposition movement known as Hery Velona ("Active Forces"). A number of already existing political parties and their leaders, among them Albert Zafy and Manandafy Rakotonirina, anchored this movement which was especially strong in Antananarivo and the surrounding high plateau.

In response to largely peaceful mass demonstrations and crippling general strikes, Ratsiraka replaced his prime minister in August 1991 but suffered an irreparable setback soon thereafter when his troops fired on peaceful demonstrators marching on Iavoloha, the suburban presidential palace, killing more than 30.

In an increasingly weakened position, Ratsiraka acceded to negotiations on the formation of a transitional government. The resulting "Panorama Convention" of 31 October 1991, stripped Ratsiraka of nearly all of his powers, created interim institutions, and set an 18-month timetable for completing a transition to a new form of constitutional government. The High Constitutional Court was retained as the ultimate judicial arbiter of the process.

In March 1992, a widely representative National Forum organized by the FFKM (Malagasy Christian Council of Churches) drafted a new Constitution. Troops guarding the proceedings clashed with pro-Ratsiraka "federalists" who tried to disrupt the forum in protest of draft constitutional provisions preventing the incumbent president from running again. The text of the new Constitution was put to a nationwide referendum in August 1992 and approved by a wide margin, despite efforts by federalists to disrupt balloting in several coastal areas.

Presidential elections were held on 25 November 1992, after the High Constitutional Court had ruled, over Hery Velona objections, that Ratsiraka could become a candidate. Runoff elections were held in February 1993, and the leader of the Hery Velona movement, Albert Zafy, defeated Ratsiraka. Zafy was sworn in as President on 27 March 1993. After President Zafy's impeachment by the National Assembly in 1996 and the short quasi-presidency of Norbert Ratsirahonana, the 1997 elections once again pitted Zafy and Ratsiraka, with Ratsiraka this time emerging victorious. A National Assembly dominated by members of President Ratsiraka'a political party AREMA subsequently passed the 1998 Constitution, which considerably strengthened the presidency.

In December 2001, a presidential election was held in which both major candidates claimed victory. The Ministry of the Interior declared incumbent Ratsiraka of the AREMA party victorious. Marc Ravalomanana contested the results and claimed victory. A political crisis followed in which Ratsiraka supporters cut major transport routes from the primary port city to the capital city, a stronghold of Ravalomanana support. Sporadic violence and considerable economic disruption continued until July 2002 when Ratsiraka and several of his prominent supporters fled to exile in France. In addition to political differences, ethnic differences played a role in the crisis and continue to play a role in politics. Ratsiraka is from the coastal Betsimisaraka tribe and Ravalomanana comes from the highland Merina tribe.

After the end of the 2002 political crisis, President Ravalomanana began many reform projects, forcefully advocating "rapid and durable development" and the launching of a battle against corruption. December 2002 legislative elections gave his newly formed TIM (Tiako-I-Madagasikara) (I Love Madagascar) Party a commanding majority in the National Assembly. November 2003 municipal elections were conducted freely, returning a majority of supporters of the president, but also significant numbers of independent and regional opposition figures.

Following the crisis of 2002, the President replaced provincial governors with appointed PDSs (Presidents des Delegations Speciales). Subsequent legislation established a structure of 22 regions to decentralize administration. In September 2004, the Government named 22 Regional Chiefs, reporting directly to the President, to implement its decentralization plans. Financing and specific powers for the regional administrations remain to be clarified.

After being re-elected in 2006, Ravalomanana's government was dissolved in March 2009, in a militarily-backed uprising led by Andry Rajoelina. Rajoelina formed a High Transitional Authority of which he was the 'Transitional Head of State'. So far he has held a referendum, in November 2010, to update the constitution. Despite an alleged coup during, this was approved, and new elections were scheduled to be held in July 2013.

The second round of the postponed presidential elections was held in December 2013 and the results were announced in January 2014. The winner and the next president was Hery Rajaonarimampianina. He was backed by Rajoelina who led the 2009 coup and still was very influential political figure.

Madagascar's President Michael Randrianirina and his spouse with Russian President Vladimir Putin at a gala reception during the Russia–Africa Summit in Moscow, 28 October 2026

In 2018 the first round of the presidential election was held on 7 November and the second round was held on 10 December. Three former presidents and the most recent president were the main candidates of the elections. Former president Andry Rajoelina won the second round of the elections. He was previously president from 2009 to 2014. Former president Marc Ravalomana lost the second round and he did not accept the results because of allegations of fraud. Ravalomana was president from 2002 to 2009. The most recent president Hery Rajaonarimampianina received very modest support in the first round. In January 2019 the High Constitutional Court declared Rajoelina as the winner of the elections and the new president. In June 2019 parliamentary elections the party of president Andry Rajoelina won absolute majority of the seats of the National Assembly. It received 84 seats and the supporters of former president Ravalomana got only 16 seats of 151 seats of the National Assembly. 51 seats of deputies were independent or represented small parties. President Rajoelina could rule as a strongman.

In November 2023, Andry Rajoelina was re-elected to another term with 58.95% of the vote in the first round of the election. Turnout was 46.36%, the lowest in a presidential election in the country's history.

On 11 October 2025, following weeks of protests against the government, the CAPSAT unit of the Malagasy army launched a coup d'état. Rajoelina fled the country and was impeached. On 17 October 2025, Colonel Michael Randrianirina was sworn in as the new president of Madagascar.

== Executive branch ==
Main office-holders
Office	Name	Party	Since
President	Col. Michael Randrianirina	Military	17 October 2025
Prime Minister	Mamitiana Rajaonarison	Independent	15 March 2026

The president is elected by direct universal suffrage for a 5-year term, renewable twice. A Prime Minister and council of ministers carries out day-to-day management of government. The President appoints the Prime Minister. The Prime Minister and members of Parliament initiate legislation and the government executes it. The President can dissolve the National Assembly. For its part, the National Assembly can pass a motion of censure and require the Prime Minister and council of ministers to step down. The Constitutional Court approves the constitutionality of new laws.

== Legislative branch ==
The Parliament has two chambers. The National Assembly (Antenimieram-Pirenena/Assemblée Nationale) has 160 members, elected for a five-year term in single-member and two-member constituencies. The Senate (Sénat) has 33 members; 22 are indirectly elected, one from each of the 22 regions of Madagascar, and 11 are appointed by the President.

== Political parties and elections ==
=== Presidential elections ===
Candidate	Party	First round		Second round	
Candidate	Party	Votes	%	Votes	%
Andry Rajoelina	Young Malagasies Determined	1,954,023	39.23	2,586,938	55.66
Marc Ravalomanana	Tiako i Madagasikara	1,760,837	35.35	2,060,847	44.34
Hery Rajaonarimampianina	Hery Vaovao ho an'ny Madagasikara	439,070	8.82		
Andre Christian Dieu Donne Mailhol	GFFM	63,391	1.27		
Joseph Martin Randriamampionona	Total Refoundation of Madagascar	57,903	1.16		
Ny Rado Rafalimanana	FOMBA	57,476	1.15		
Andrianiaina Paul Rabary	MIASA	48,980	0.98		
Randriamanantsoa Tabera	KINTANA	48,705	0.98		
Haingo Andrianjakamalala Rasolofonjoa	Avotra ho an'ny firenena	47,932	0.96		
Mamy Richard Radilofe	Roso ho amin'ny Demokrasia Sosialy	42,748	0.86		
Eliana Bezaza	Social Democratic Party	40,882	0.82		
Jean Ravelonarivo	Antokom-Bahoaka	29,224	0.59		
Lalaoarisoa Marcellin Andriantseheno	Tafajiaby	28,252	0.57		
José Michel Andrianoelison	ARO-RIAKA	26,572	0.53		
Richard Razafy Rakotofiringa	SJIAM	26,534	0.53		
Andriamparany Benjamin Radavidson	National Unity, Freedom & Development	25,420	0.51		
Saraha Rabeharisoa	Liberal Democratic Party	23,685	0.48		
Olivier Mahafaly Solonandrasana	PARRAINAGE	23,437	0.47		
Didier Ratsiraka	Association for the Rebirth of Madagascar	22,222	0.45		
Roland Ratsiraka	Malagasy Tonga Saina	21,377	0.43		
Serge Jovial Imbeh	Antoky ny Fivoaran'ny Malagasy	18,962	0.38		
Zafimahaleo Dit Dama Mahaleo Rasolofondraosolo	Manajary Vahoaka	16,367	0.33		
Omer Beriziky	Antsika Madagasikara	15,352	0.31		
Jean Jacques Ratsietison	Fahefa-Mividy no Ilain'ny Malagasy	15,281	0.31		
Erick Francis Rajaonary	Malagasy Miray sy Mifankatia	14,758	0.30		
Rivomanantsoa Orlando Robimanana	Madagsikara Vina sy Fanantenana	14,561	0.29		
Fanirisoa Ernaivo	ZAMA–PATRAM	14,117	0.28		
Arlette Ramaroson	PARRAINAGE	12,645	0.25		
Falimampionona Rasolonjatovo	FITAMBOLAGNELA/IAD	12,276	0.25		
Jean Max Rakotomamomjy	LEADER-Fanilo	11,377	0.23		
Rolland Jules Etienne	Madagasikara Fivoarana	10,756	0.22		
Bruno Rabarihoela	Fahazavan'i Madagasikara	9,981	0.20		
Roseline Emma Rasolovoahangy	Ezaka Mampandroso Antsika	8,578	0.17		
Jean Louis Zafivao	Gasy Mifankatia	6,162	0.12		
Stephan Narison	Antoko Gasy Miara Mandroso	5,675	0.11		
Solo Norbert Randriamorasata	Democratic Union of the Christians of Madagascar	5,086	0.10		
Total		4,980,604	100.00	4,647,785	100.00
Valid votes		4,980,604	92.79	4,647,785	97.49
Invalid/blank votes		386,946	7.21	119,557	2.51
Total votes		5,367,550	100.00	4,767,342	100.00
Registered voters/turnout		9,949,083	53.95	9,913,599	48.09
Source: Constitutional Court (first round, second round)

=== Parliamentary elections ===
Party	Votes	%	Seats
Isika Rehetra Miaraka amin'i Andry Rajoelina	1,402,480	34.77	84
Tiako i Madagasikara	435,740	10.80	16
Malagasy Tia Tanindrazana	48,477	1.20	1
Banjino ny Repoblika	33,363	0.83	0
Leader-FANILO	26,030	0.65	0
Ainga Lavitra Ezaka ho an'ny Fanovana	22,716	0.56	0
Dina Iombonan-Kevitra	20,889	0.52	0
Antokom-Bahoaka Malagasy	18,727	0.46	0
Malagasy Tonga Saina	18,582	0.46	1
Total Refoundation of Madagascar	18,542	0.46	0
Association for the Rebirth of Madagascar	16,248	0.40	0
National Union for the Refoundation and Reconstruction of Madagascar	15,801	0.39	0
Social Democratic Party of Madagascar	15,267	0.38	0
Tanora Maroantsetra Miray	15,098	0.37	0
Group of Young Malagasy Patriots	14,392	0.36	1
Madagasikara Vina sy Fanantenana	11,245	0.28	0
Antoka sy Dinan’ny Nosy	11,008	0.27	0
Fitambolagnela - Identité, Ambition, Developpement	10,411	0.26	0
Movement for Democracy in Madagascar	9,863	0.24	1
Fiovana Ivoaran'ny eny Ifotony	7,824	0.19	0
Liberal Group of Madagascar	7,687	0.19	0
Madagascar for the Malagasy	7,194	0.18	0
Congress Party for the Independence of Madagascar	5,988	0.15	0
Gasy Mifankatia	4,301	0.11	0
Rebirth of the Social Democratic Party	4,023	0.10	0
Fihavanan Avaradrano Mandroso	3,106	0.08	0
Malagasy Labour Party	2,863	0.07	0
RPSD Vaovao	2,809	0.07	1
Adhem Fizafa	2,807	0.07	0
Ampela Manao Politika	1,518	0.04	0
Vondron'ny Tia Tanindrazana	1,428	0.04	0
Tanora Malagasy Miroso	996	0.02	0
Gasikara Antsika Rehetra	846	0.02	0
Antoky ny Fivoran'ny Malagasy	842	0.02	0
Fahazavan'i Madagasikara	829	0.02	0
Vonona sy Vanona Isika	801	0.02	0
Tambatra	768	0.02	0
FMI Malagasy	476	0.01	0
Tafajiaby	452	0.01	0
Antoky ny Hoavin'i Madagasikara	250	0.01	0
Independents	1,810,694	44.89	46
Total	4,033,381	100.00	151
Valid votes	4,034,129	96.36	
Invalid/blank votes	152,598	3.64	
Total votes	4,186,727	100.00	
Registered voters/turnout	10,215,267	40.98	
Source: HCC

== Administrative divisions ==
Territorial administration is to be determined by legislation. In an effort to decentralize administration, the constitution calls for the six provinces (faritany) to become autonomous. The provinces are Antananarivo, Antsiranana, Fianarantsoa, Mahajanga, Toamasina, Toliara.

== International organization participation ==
ACCT, ACP, AfDB, ECA, FAO, G-77, IAEA, IBRD, ICAO, ICC, ICFTU, ICRM, IDA, IFAD, IFC, IFRCS, ILO, IMF, IMO, InOC, Intelsat, Interpol, IOC, IOM (observer), ISO (correspondent), ITU, NAM, OAU, OPCW, UN, UNCTAD, UNESCO, UNHCR, UNIDO, UPU, WCL, WCO, WFTU, WHO, WIPO, WMO, WToO, WTrO

== Notable people ==
- Mirelle Mialy Rakotomala, diplomat, musician, cultural advocate for Malagasy culture
- Pierre Ramampy, politician
- Roseline Emma Rasolovoahangy, candidante for president
