= Herilanto Raveloharison =

Malagasy magistrate and politician (1958–2022)

- Born: April 9, 1958 (age 68); Antsiranana, Madagascar
- Died: January 17, 2022; Antananarivo, Madagascar
- Occupations: Magistrate, military officer
- Title: Minister for Economy and Strategic Planning
- Term: April 2014 - June 2018
- Military career
- Rank: Lieutenant General

Lieutenant General Herilanto Raveloharison (April 9, 1958 - January 17, 2022) was a Malagasy magistrate, politician and military officer. He served as the Minister for Economy and Strategic Planning from April 2014, under Prime Minister Roger Kolo to June 2018 when he was succeeded by Professor Marcel Napetoke under Christian Ntsay government.

== Personal life ==
He was born in Antsiranana, Madagascar. He was a graduate in Administration and Public Management from University of Paris 1 Pantheon-Sorbonne and Institut international d'administration publique of Paris,

== Career ==
Herilanto Raveloharison held important positions in Madagascar. He was the Minister for Environment and Forests under the Albert Camille Vital government during the transition period led by Andry Nirina Rajoelina.

In 2012, he was appointed as the president of Comité pour la Sauvegarde de l'Integrité (Committee for the Safeguard of Integrity ). After Hery Rajaonarimampianina's election as the President of Republic, Major General Raveloharison was one among the 31 ministers of Roger Kolo's government for the fourth Republic.

General Raveloharison served as the Minister for Economy and Strategic Planning between 2014 and 2018. In September 2014, constant power-cuts afflicted the country. Fihenena Richard, Minister for Energy at that time, was dismissed. General Raveloharison was appointed to serve as an acting Minister for Energy. In December 2014, he was promoted to Lieutenant General for his effort in drafting the National Development Plan in less than six months as planned. On January 25, 2015, he was retained in office as the Minister for Economy and Strategic Planning in the government of Prime Minister Jean Ravelonarivo and retained in the government of Olivier Mahafaly Solonandrasana in April 2016 until he went to retire in 2018.

== Death ==
General Raveloharison died on 17 January 2022 after he has succumbed to COVID-19.
