= Jean Ernest Rakotomiandrisoa =

Malagasy politician and former minister

Jean Ernest Rakotomiandrisoa is a Malagasy politician and a general of the National Gendarmerie. He served as a member of the National Assembly of Madagascar for the Antsirabe I constituency and later as the Minister of the Interior and Decentralization.

== Political career ==
Rakotomiandrisoa was elected to the National Assembly as a member of the Tiako I Madagasikara (TIM) party, representing the constituency of Antsirabe I during the 2007–2013 legislative period.

Following his time in the Assembly, he was appointed Minister of the Interior and Decentralization on 18 April 2014 under the government of Prime Minister Roger Kolo. He maintained this portfolio in the following cabinet led by Jean Ravelonarivo until April 2015, when he was succeeded by Olivier Mahafaly Solonandrasana.
