= 2018 Malagasy presidential election =

- 7 November 2018 (first round); 19 December 2018 (second round)
- Turnout: 53.95% (first round); 48.09% (second round)
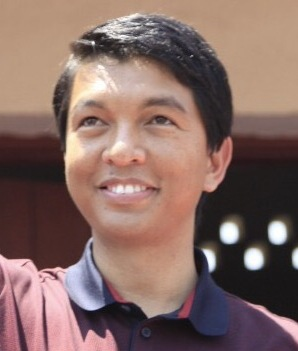

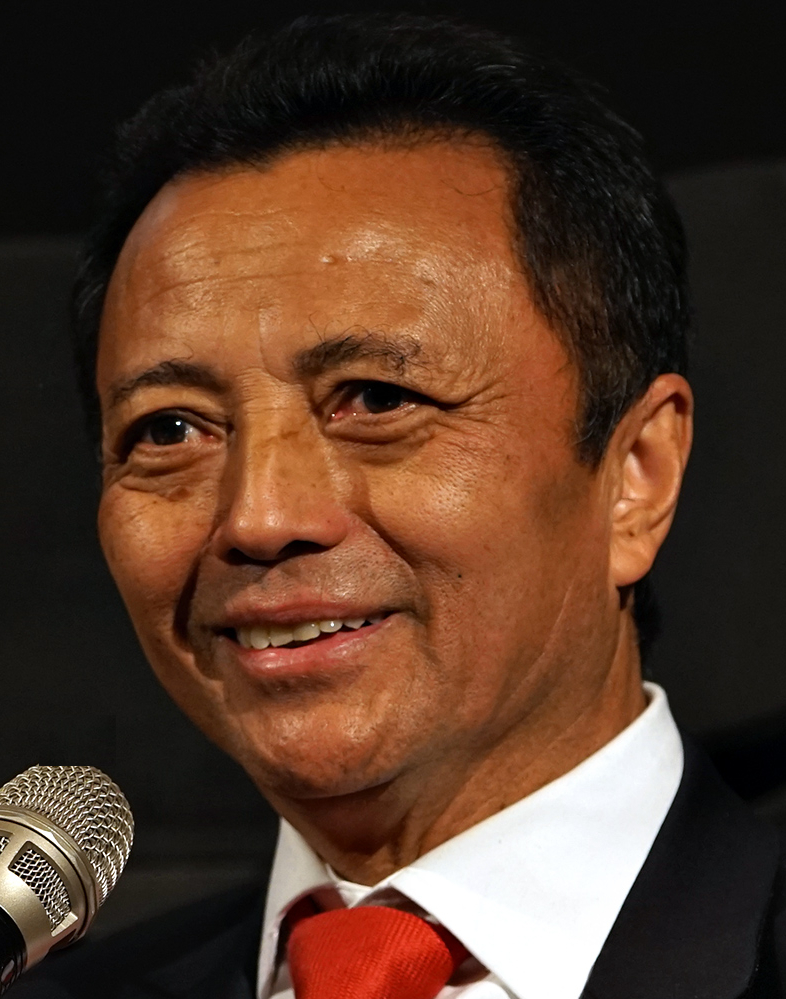
Nominee	Andry Rajoelina	Marc Ravalomanana
Party	TGV	TIM
Popular vote	2,586,938	2,060,847
Percentage	55.66%	44.34%
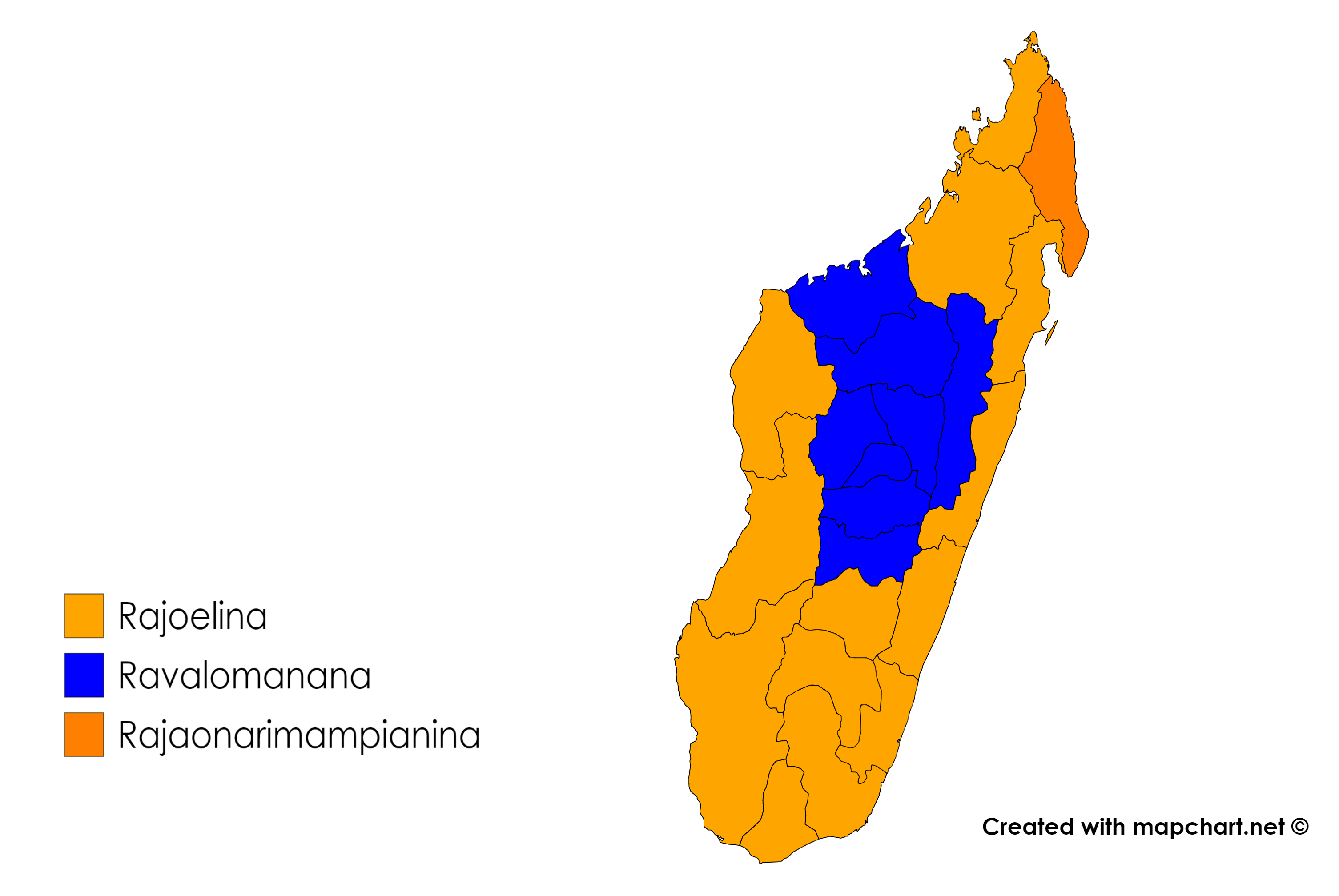
President before election
Hery Rajaonarimampianina
HVM
Elected President
Andry Rajoelina
TGV

Presidential elections were held in Madagascar on 7 November 2018. As no candidate received a majority of the vote, a second round involving the top two candidates, Andry Rajoelina and Marc Ravalomanana, was held on 19 December. On 27 December Rajoelina was announced as the winner with 56% of the vote.

== Electoral system ==
The President of Madagascar is elected using the two-round system; if no candidate receives a majority of the vote in the first round, a run-off will be held.

== Candidates ==
Former President Marc Ravalomanana, who resigned following a political crisis in 2009, announced that he would run again for the presidency. His successor, Andry Rajoelina, also announced his intention to contest the elections. Incumbent Hery Rajaonarimampianina unsuccessfully sought to block Ravaolmanana and Rajoelina from running on grounds that they had participated in the 2009 coup d'état. In September 2018, Rajaonarimampianina stepped down to run for reelection, allowing a caretaker government to administer the vote, in accordance with the constitution.

There were a record 36 candidates in the race (surpassing the previous record of 33), including four of the five most recent presidents. However, only five candidates were women, seen by some of illustrating the historic patriarchal dominance of Malagasy politics and culture.

== Campaign ==
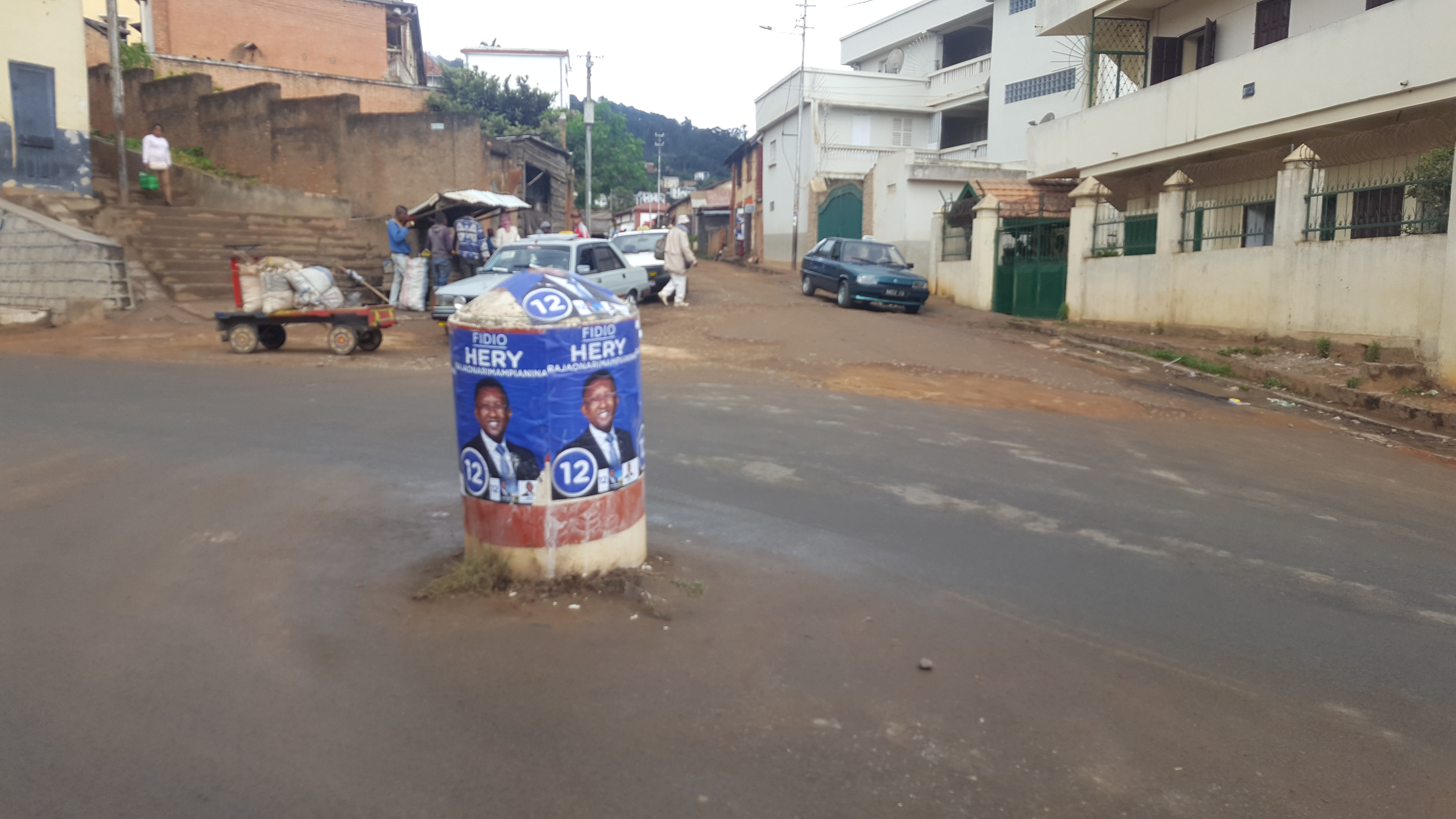
Poster for incumbent president Hery Rajaonarimampianina in Fianarantsoa in October 2018

Despite the majority of Malagasy people living in poverty, the elections were expected to be one of the most expensive per capita in 2018. The top three candidates; Hery Rajaonarimampianina, Andry Rajoelina, and Marc Ravalomanana ended up at a significant financial advantage over the other contenders, with candidate Ny Rado Rafalimanana complaining that due to financial constraints, it was impossible for any other candidate to compete with the top three, as there are no campaign finance limits. Some election observers believed that the winner of the election would have more to do with that candidate's financial power and influence than their political positions. The lavish spending on the election has also been criticized due to the large amount of poverty in the country, with many believing the money could be better spent elsewhere.

Although two-thirds of the population is under 25, turnout and interest among young people is low.

== Results ==
Candidate	Party	First round		Second round	
Candidate	Party	Votes	%	Votes	%
Andry Rajoelina	Young Malagasies Determined	1,954,023	39.23	2,586,938	55.66
Marc Ravalomanana	Tiako i Madagasikara	1,760,837	35.35	2,060,847	44.34
Hery Rajaonarimampianina	Hery Vaovao ho an'ny Madagasikara	439,070	8.82		
Andre Christian Dieu Donne Mailhol	GFFM	63,391	1.27		
Joseph Martin Randriamampionona	Total Refoundation of Madagascar	57,903	1.16		
Ny Rado Rafalimanana	FOMBA	57,476	1.15		
Andrianiaina Paul Rabary	MIASA	48,980	0.98		
Randriamanantsoa Tabera	KINTANA	48,705	0.98		
Haingo Andrianjakamalala Rasolofonjoa	Avotra ho an'ny firenena	47,932	0.96		
Mamy Richard Radilofe	Roso ho amin'ny Demokrasia Sosialy	42,748	0.86		
Eliana Bezaza	Social Democratic Party	40,882	0.82		
Jean Ravelonarivo	Antokom-Bahoaka	29,224	0.59		
Lalaoarisoa Marcellin Andriantseheno	Tafajiaby	28,252	0.57		
José Michel Andrianoelison	ARO-RIAKA	26,572	0.53		
Richard Razafy Rakotofiringa	SJIAM	26,534	0.53		
Andriamparany Benjamin Radavidson	National Unity, Freedom & Development	25,420	0.51		
Saraha Rabeharisoa	Liberal Democratic Party	23,685	0.48		
Olivier Mahafaly Solonandrasana	PARRAINAGE	23,437	0.47		
Didier Ratsiraka	Association for the Rebirth of Madagascar	22,222	0.45		
Roland Ratsiraka	Malagasy Tonga Saina	21,377	0.43		
Serge Jovial Imbeh	Antoky ny Fivoaran'ny Malagasy	18,962	0.38		
Zafimahaleo Dit Dama Mahaleo Rasolofondraosolo	Manajary Vahoaka	16,367	0.33		
Omer Beriziky	Antsika Madagasikara	15,352	0.31		
Jean Jacques Ratsietison	Fahefa-Mividy no Ilain'ny Malagasy	15,281	0.31		
Erick Francis Rajaonary	Malagasy Miray sy Mifankatia	14,758	0.30		
Rivomanantsoa Orlando Robimanana	Madagsikara Vina sy Fanantenana	14,561	0.29		
Fanirisoa Ernaivo	ZAMA–PATRAM	14,117	0.28		
Arlette Ramaroson	PARRAINAGE	12,645	0.25		
Falimampionona Rasolonjatovo	FITAMBOLAGNELA/IAD	12,276	0.25		
Jean Max Rakotomamomjy	LEADER-Fanilo	11,377	0.23		
Rolland Jules Etienne	Madagasikara Fivoarana	10,756	0.22		
Bruno Rabarihoela	Fahazavan'i Madagasikara	9,981	0.20		
Roseline Emma Rasolovoahangy	Ezaka Mampandroso Antsika	8,578	0.17		
Jean Louis Zafivao	Gasy Mifankatia	6,162	0.12		
Stephan Narison	Antoko Gasy Miara Mandroso	5,675	0.11		
Solo Norbert Randriamorasata	Democratic Union of the Christians of Madagascar	5,086	0.10		
Total		4,980,604	100.00	4,647,785	100.00
Valid votes		4,980,604	92.79	4,647,785	97.49
Invalid/blank votes		386,946	7.21	119,557	2.51
Total votes		5,367,550	100.00	4,767,342	100.00
Registered voters/turnout		9,949,083	53.95	9,913,599	48.09
Source: Constitutional Court (first round, second round)
