= Mireille Mialy Rakotomalala =

Malagasy piano player and politician

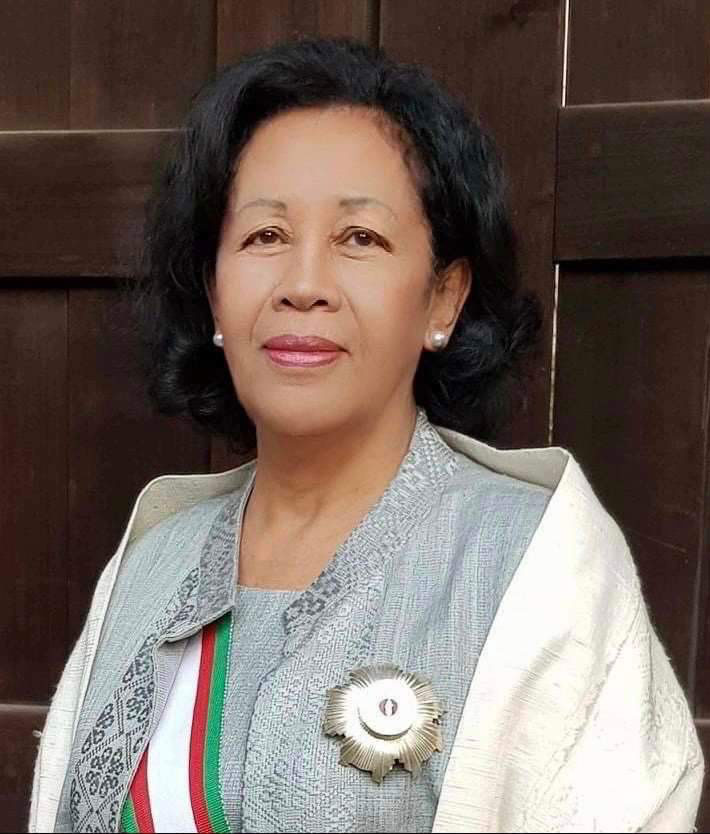
- Occupations: pianist, deputy, minister, ambassador, professor

Mireille Mially Rakotomalala is a leading figure in Madagascar within the fields of music, culture, education, and diplomacy. She is a former Minister of Culture of Madagascar; professor at the Institute of Civilization of the University of Antananarivo; member of Madagascar's National Academy of Arts, Letters and Sciences; member of the Academy of Sciences of the Territories of Overseas France; and was a representative of the Republic of Madagascar to the International Organization of Francophonie and Ambassador Extraordinary and Plenipotentiary of the Republic of Madagascar to Japan.

== Biography ==
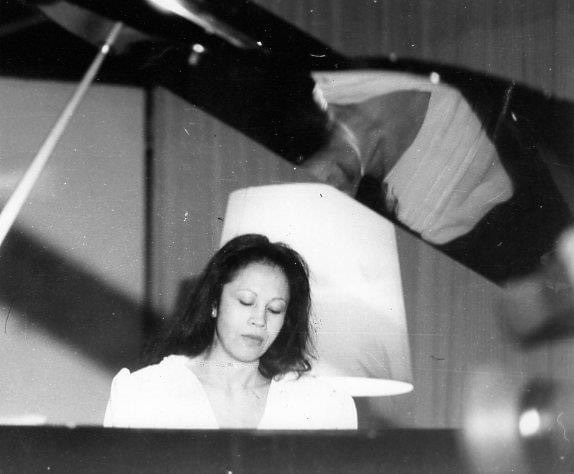
Mireille Rakotomalala in 1993.

Born in Antananarivo, Mireille Rakotomalala is a classical pianist who became the first Malagasy to win the First Prize of the Conservatoire National Supérieur de Musique et de Danse de Paris. Her concert career began when she toured Germany at the age of fifteen. She gained degrees from the national conservatories of music in Kiev, Ukraine, and St. Petersburg, Russia.

Rakotomalala has been a notable advocate and researcher of Malagasy culture. In 1986, she founded a research laboratory within the Museum of Art and Archaeology, now the Institute of Civilization of the University of Antananarivo. There she guided thesis and dissertation works and fostered exchanges with local and foreign institutions, including Indiana University (Bloomington), Tokyo University of the Arts, and the Austrian Academy of Sciences.

== Politics ==
She was elected as a parliament member in Antananarivo and then held the position of advisor to the Minister of Foreign Affairs and Minister of Culture and Communication.

Her commitment to the cultural dialogue between Madagascar and Japan led to her appointment as Ambassador Extraordinary and Plenipotentiary of the Republic of Madagascar to Japan.

== Others ==
She has chaired cultural, educational and charitable associations promoting Malagasy culture. These include the Comité national du patrimoine de Madagascar, the Amis du patrimoine de Madagascar, Mikolo ny Kolotsaina for the preservation and promotion of the city's heritage, the Ligue de Madagascar de l'enseignement, de l'éducation et de la culture populaire the Ligue Internationale de l'enseignement, de l'éducation et de la culture populaire Jeu de Go Madagascar (Association I-GO Madagascar) and the Rotary Club Antananarivo Ivandry.

She is a full member of the Madagascar's National Academy of Arts, Letters and Sciences, an associate member of the Academy of Overseas Sciences of the French Republic, and was a representative of the Republic of Madagascar to the International Organization of Francophonie.

She was an executive member of the Association of Alumni and Friends of Japan in Madagascar, where she was president for three consecutive terms since 1986. Since 2021, she has been the honorary president.

== Awards ==
Mireille Rakotomalala was awarded several titles and distinctions

- Knight of the Malagasy National Order by decree number 94–403 in 1994
- Officer of the Malagasy National Order by the decree number 2002–1466 in 2002
- Commander of the Malagasy National Order by Decree No. 2007–529 in 2007
- Grand Officer of the Malagasy National Order by Decree number 2010–758 in 2010

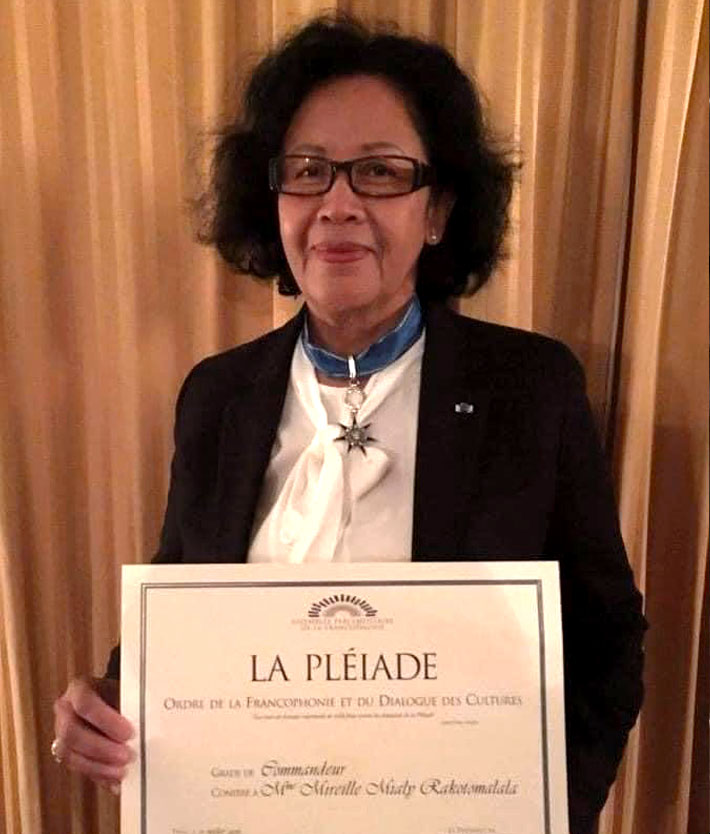
Commander of the Order of La Pléiade (2016)

- Commander of Arts, Letters, and Culture of Madagascar in 2012
- Second Class Grand Cross of the Malagasy National Order by Decree number 2017–466 in 2017
- Commander of the Order of La Pléiade number 709/2016 in 2016
- Knight of the Legion of Honor in 2003

She also received the Order of the Rising Sun, Gold and Silver Star (Order of Japan).

== Artworks ==
Mireille Rakotomalala, Senior Lecturer at the University of Antananarivo · [4], is an ethnomusicologist with contributions to the study of Malagasy music. Her notable artworks include:

- Bibliographie critique sur l'ethnomusicologie malgache, Travaux et Documents n23, Institut de Civilisations (Musée d'Art et d'Archéologie) 1986, Antananarivo
- Évolution de la Musique malgache et ses courants d'influence In, bulletin de l'Académie National Malgache des Arts des Lettres et des Sciences, 1986, Antananarivo
- Drums of Madagascar, in Drums: Heartbeat of Africa, Publication by Gallery Hamrad, African Art, Edition Esther Dagan, 1993, USA
- Réflexion sur la Musique malgache et son évolution, in Cahiers du Cite, Nouvelle série n3, 1996, Antananarivo
- Dances of Madagascar, in the spirit of dance in Africa. Evolution, Transformation, and continuity in Sub-Saharan, Edition Esther Dagan, 1997, Canada
- Performance in Madagascar, in The Garland Encyclopedia of World Music, Editor Ruth M. Stone, p 781–792, 1998, New York and London
- La musique dans l'histoire, Edition ANAKO, 220 p., 2003, France
- Pratiques musicales à Madagascar, in KABARO, Revue internationale des Sciences de l'Homme et des Sociétés, Diversités et spécificités des musiques de l'Océan Indien, VoL II-3, Université de la Réunion, Édité par Y.S. Live et J.F.Hamon, le Harmattan, 2004, Paris
- Les instruments de musique dans la tradition malgache, Vienna Series in Ethnomusicology, Éditeur August Shmidhofer, Institut de Musicologie, Université de Vienne (Autriche), Edition Tsipika, 2009, Antananarivo
- Madagascar: History, Culture, and Geography of Music, in the SAGE International Encyclopedia of Music and Culture, Edited by Janet Sturman, 2019, London
- Rakotomalala Mireille, Les instruments de musique de Madagascar, in Chapter Routledge Malagasy World, sous presse, USA and London.
