= Hery Rajaonarimampianina =

President of Madagascar from 2014 to 2018

His Excellency Hery Rajaonarimampianina
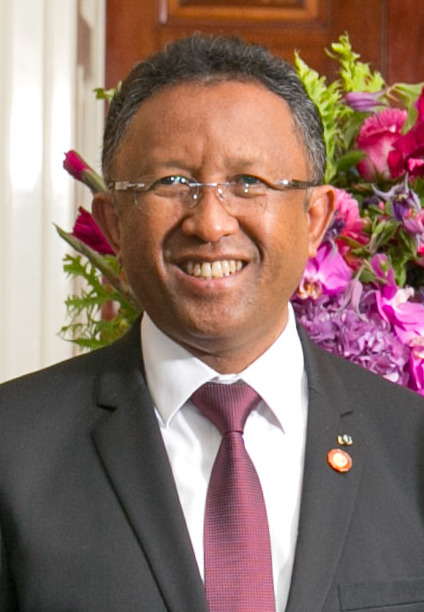
- Rajaonarimampianina in 2014

7th President of Madagascar
- In office 25 January 2014 – 7 September 2018
- Prime Minister: Omer Beriziky; Roger Kolo; Jean Ravelonarivo; Olivier Solonandrasana; Christian Ntsay
- Preceded by: Andry Rajoelina (as President of the High Transitional Authority)
- Succeeded by: Rivo Rakotovao (acting)

Personal details
- Born: Hery Martial Rajaonarimampianina Rakotoarimanana; 6 November 1958 (age 67) Antananarivo, Madagascar
- Party: Hery Vaovao ho an'i Madagasikara
- Spouse: Voahangy Rajaonarimampianina
- Education: University of Antananarivo; University of Quebec, Trois-Rivieres
- Website: Campaign website original link Official Facebook Page

Hery Martial Rajaonarimampianina Rakotoarimanana (Malagasy: [heˈrʲ radzawˌnariˈmampʲanː]; French: [əʁi ʁaʒaɔnaʁimãpjanina]; born 6 November 1958) is a Malagasy politician who served as the seventh President of Madagascar from 2014 to 2018, refusing to run for re-election.

Previously he served as Minister of Finance under President Andry Rajoelina, and he was the Rajoelina political movement's candidate in the 2013 presidential election. He won the vote in a second round, defeating Jean-Louis Robinson, the candidate of Marc Ravalomanana's party. Once he was elected, Rajaonarimampianina held the world record of the head of state with the longest name (44 characters) as well as family name (19 characters).

== Early life ==
Hery Rajaonarimampianina was born to a modest family. He lived in Sabotsy Namehana, neighborhood of Antananarivo, Madagascar. In 1982, Rajaonarimampianina obtained an MBA at the "Etablissement d’Enseignement Supérieur de Droit, d’Economie, de Gestion et de Sciences Sociales (EESDEGS) – Université d’Ankatso Antananarivo. Then, he moved to Canada to complete his training in finance and accounting at Université du Québec à Trois-Rivières, receiving a postgraduate diploma (DEA) in accounting science in 1986. Rajaonarimampianina obtained the Canadian Diploma of Accounting from the Certified General Accountant’s Association (C.G.A) in 1991.

In 1991, Rajaonarimampianina went back to Madagascar and worked as an accountant. He also became the studies director of the National Institute for Business Administration and Accounting Science (INSCAE) in Antananarivo (Madagascar) and teacher assistant at the Antananarivo University (Madagascar) and at the Institute of Business Administration (IAE) of the Metz University (France).

In 1995, Rajaonarimampianina created the accountant firm Auditeurs Associes – C.G.A, in Antananarivo. With 50 associates, the firm operates throughout Madagascar for private commercial companies both domestic and international. It also assists entities in their projects supported by international fundraisers.

In 2003 he was elected President of the "Ordre des Experts Comptables et Commissaires aux Comptes de Madagascar" (Professional Order of Chartered Accountants and Statutory Auditors of Madagascar) and appointed Vice-Président of the "Conseil Supérieur de la Comptabilité" (Superior Accounting Council) and counsel of the "Comité pour la Sauvegarde de l’Intégrité" (Committee for the Safeguarding of the Integrity).

== Political career ==
In 2009, Rajaonarimampianina became Minister of Finance and Budget, at a time marked by the withdrawal of the main international funders of Madagascar since 2008.

=== 2013 presidential election ===
Rajaonarimampianina set up the political organisation "Hery Vaovao hoan'i Madagasikara" in 2013 ("New Forces for Madagascar") and ran for Presidency with 32 other competitors. His major opponents were Andry Nirina Rajoelina from the ruling political party Tanora Gasy Vonona (TGV), the proxy of the former président Marc Ravalomanana, Jean-Louis Robinson from Antoko ny Vahoaka Aloha No Andrianina (AVANA) party and two former Prime Ministers of the High Transitional Authority Albert Camille Vital and Roindefo Zafitsimivalo Monja.

After the first round Rajaonarimampianina received 15.62%, second to Robinson. The sum of all opponents of former President Ravalomanana's party received 55% of the vote.

Before the second round, he gathered his party members and supporters in many rallies, including Roland Ratsiraka, nephew of former President Didier Ratsiraka and Pierrot Rajaonarivelo. He also gained support from Andry Rajoelina, the sitting President of the High Transitional Authority, after it was determined that Rajoelina was ineligible to run because he had not submitted his candidacy documents in time.

In the second round, Hery Rajaonarimampianina quickly led the first preliminary results of the election established by the Independent National Electoral Commission of the Transition (CENIT) in elections that international observers deemed "free, transparent, reliable and credible".

=== Impeachment attempt ===
On 26 May 2015, the Parliament of Madagascar voted to remove the president from office, due to "alleged constitutional violations and general incompetence". The constitutional court disallowed the motion under the grounds the accusations were unfounded and then inadmissible.

=== Religion and politics ===
Rajaonarimampianina has been accused by critics of threatening Madagascar's secular constitution by sponsoring church events and often appearing at churches at rallies. This is not entirely new in Madagascar's history as Rajaonarimapianina's predecessor Marc Ravalomanana was a senior member of the FJKM and Andry Rajoelina was a devout Catholic, both using events of their respective denominations to boost support. Rajaonarimampianina has only appeared and sponsored the events of denominations in Madagascar that have a large number of adherents, namely the Catholic Church, the Church of Jesus Christ in Madagascar, the Malagasy Lutheran Church, and the Anglican Church, while ignoring other smaller religious denominations such as the Seventh-day Adventist Church, the Church of Jesus Christ of Latter-day Saints, Jehovah's Witnesses, and the country's Muslim minority which have fewer followers.

=== 2018 presidential election ===
On 8 September 2018 Rajaonarimampianina officially resigned from the presidential office and declared his candidacy for the 2018 election. According to the Malagasy constitution incumbent candidates must resign at least 60 days before in order to be eligible for reelection. On his last official day of his term Rajaonarimampianina named new army generals and appointed new ambassadors to China and Russia.

== Awards and decorations ==
=== National ===
- Madagascar:
  - Grand Cordon of the National Order of Madagascar (2014) (automatic upon taking presidential office)

=== Foreign ===
- Armenia:
  - Order of Honour (2018)
- Morocco:
  - Collar of the Order of Muhammad (2016)
- Serbia:
  - Second class of the Order of the Republic of Serbia (2016)

=== Organisations ===
- International Organisation of La Francophonie:
  - Grand Cross of the Order of the Pleiades (2016)

Political offices
Preceded by Andry Rajoelina as President of the High Transitional Authority of Madagascar	President of Madagascar; 2014–2018	Succeeded by Rivo Rakotovao (Acting)
