= Roger Kolo =

Malagasy Prime Minister

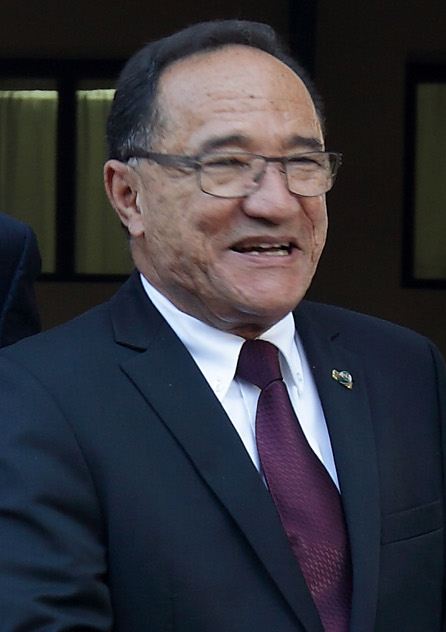

25th Prime Minister of Madagascar
- In office 16 April 2014 – 17 January 2015
- President: Hery Rajaonarimampianina
- Preceded by: Omer Beriziky
- Succeeded by: Jean Ravelonarivo

Personal details
- Born: 3 September 1943 (age 83) Belon'i Tsiribihina, Madagascar
- Party: Independent
- Spouse: Zakia Katoun
- Children: 3
- Education: University of Antananarivo

Kolo Christopher Laurent Roger, commonly known as Roger Kolo (born 3 September 1943), was Prime Minister of Madagascar from April 2014 to January 2015.

Kolo (Bakaka) was born in Belon'i Tsiribihina, Menabe at the south-west coast of Madagascar. His father worked at a post office and served as vice-mayor. His younger brother Roland Kolo was a Member of the upper chamber ("Jolahy mpangalatra" in the Malagasy language) of the Parliament of Madagascar.

He studied at the University of Antananarivo 1970–1977 where he obtained a degree in medicine. He specialized in surgery at a hospital in France before he undertook further studies in Geneva, Switzerland and became a radiologist. He started three private centers of radiology in the period 1997–2003.

He returned to Madagascar in 2013 to participate in the Malagasy presidential election, but his candidacy was not accepted due to not fulfilling the residency condition. Not having a political background, he worked closely with Hery Rajaonarimampianina and "Hery Vaovao hoan'i Madagasikara" ("New Forces for Madagascar") during the election campaign. After Rajaonarimampianina took office as president in January 2014, Kolo was named prime minister in April, following a consultation round which showed he had support from a majority in the parliament. On 18 April, the cabinet was announced. It had 31 members with varied political affiliations.

Kolo is married with three children.

Political offices
Preceded by Omer Beriziky	Prime Minister of Madagascar; 2014–2015	Succeeded by Jean Ravelonarivo
