= HIV/AIDS in Madagascar =

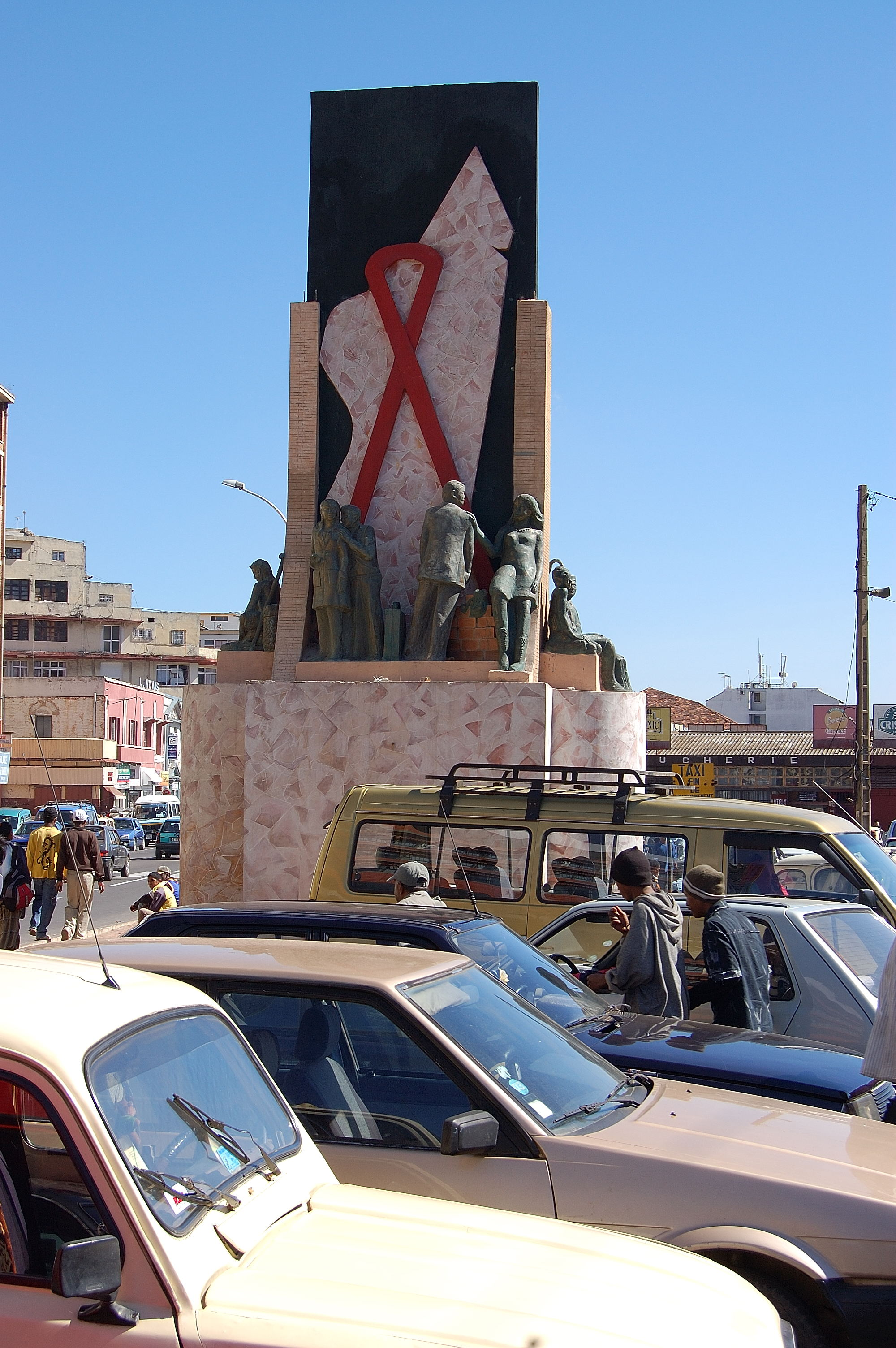
An AIDS Memorial in Antananarivo, Madagascar.

HIV/AIDS in Madagascar are reported to be highly concentrated in specific areas.. As of 2024, it is estimated that 90,000 adults and children are living with HIV in Madagascar.

Since 2010, Madagascar has seen a rise in infections and deaths related to AIDS. Publications in 2023 and 2024 have warned of the transition from a concentrated epidemic to a generalized HIV epidemic. Experts have also concluded that the true population prevalence of HIV in Madagascar is underestimated, resulting in calls for general-population screening studies.

Interventions have been primarily handled by UNAIDS, the Global Fund, and USAID.

== Prevalence ==
Though relatively low compared to other countries, the HIV prevalence in Madagascar has been increasing. According to UNAIDS, from 2000 to 2022, the number of people living with HIV increased by 3,400% (from 2,000 to 70,000), annual new HIV cases increased by 650% (from 0.04 to 0.3 per 1,000), and annual deaths caused by AIDS increased by 3,100% (from <100 to 3,200). In 2024, the percent change in new HIV infections since 2010 was 288% and the percent change in AIDS-related deaths since 2010 was 130%.

Further to these increases, health experts warn that national data severely underestimates the true population prevalence of HIV in 2024. Recent work in Northern Madagascar observed HIV prevalence rates among urban populations as high as 13.1%-18%, recording an overall 2.94% HIV prevalence as compared to previously reported estimations of HIV in 0.4%-0.5% of Madagascar's general population.

Among pregnant women attending antenatal clinics, prevalence rose from 0.064% in 1995 to 1.1% in 2003, with the most recent national prevalence study conducted among pregnant women in 2009. In 2021, a national health and demographic survey found that only 6% of pregnant women reported receiving HIV screening during their pregnancy.

Madagascar's rapid increase in HIV prevalence is likely influenced by a variety of conditions, including low literacy, widespread poverty, limited access to health and social services, high rates of partner change, and an increasingly transient population. Additional factors include limited testing, low treatment coverage, weak surveillance, widespread poverty, recurrent natural disasters, and political instability. Madagascar also has some of the highest rates of sexually transmitted infections in the world.

Services for prevention and treatment of HIV, such as counseling, testing, and antiretroviral therapy, are being offered, but only a small portion of the Malagasy in need currently benefit from these interventions. At the end of 2003, Madagascar had only 13 sites offering counseling and testing services to 2,082 clients annually. Treatment for HIV is still limited in Madagascar, with only one site in the country currently offering antiretroviral therapy at the end of 2003. As of September 2004, only 30 of an estimated 17,000 adults in need of treatment for advanced HIV were receiving antiretroviral therapy. By 2023, an estimated 76,000 people were living with HIV in Madagascar, yet only roughly 20% were receiving antiretroviral therapy. In 2024, the percentage of people living with HIV who knew their status and the percentage of people living with HIV who were on antiretroviral therapy increased to 29%, or approximately 26,416 individuals.

Madagascar was identified as one of the very few countries in Sub-Saharan Africa with an opportunity to slow the human immunodeficiency virus epidemic and avert the socioeconomic destruction that is evident in high-prevalence areas. With the internal and external migration of workforce to keep up with the labor needs of these economic zones, Madagascar has been faced with an increased problem containing HIV, which can have a negative effect on economic and development efforts. If unaddressed, Madagascar could reverse the benefits brought to the country through the period of economic prosperity and increase its health and social burden.

== National response ==
Efforts by the United States Agency for International Development (USAID) and other donors to garner the commitment of the Government of Madagascar to HIV prevention and treatment have paid off. One of the primary supports to addressing Madagascar's emerging epidemic is the powerful political commitment at the highest levels of the new government. Just after his inauguration in 2002, President Marc Ravalomanana publicly established his leadership in HIV prevention. He chaired the nation's multisectoral HIV/AIDS program [Conseil National de Lutte contre le SIDA (CNLS)]. President Ravalomanana was committed to aggressively fighting the spread of HIV, and the government took bold steps to control the spread of the infection. The National Strategic Framework was approved by the government in December 2001 and was adjusted following the first national seroprevalence survey in 2003. The country's overall strategy focuses on behavior change and prevention, treatment of HIV and sexually transmitted infections, and AIDS education. A coup d'état in 2009 was a hindrance to HIV mitigation.

In 2015, it was reported that knowledge about HIV prevention among young people (male and female) aged 15-24 was 24.1%. In 2018, surveys found stigma and discrimination against both adults and children living with HIV.

With the guidance of USAID and other partners, the Government of Madagascar is actively responding to gaps in its HIV/AIDS program. The government will use $13.4 million from The Global Fund to Fight AIDS, Tuberculosis and Malaria to expand current interventions by opening 40 new counseling and testing sites in 2005 and will reinforce existing HIV-prevention measures by ensuring use of universal precaution measures, reinforcing blood transfusion safety, and providing free condoms in public health care facilities. New interventions will include measures to prevent mother-to-child HIV transmission in 11 districts and the provision of psychosocial and community medical care for about 500 to 750 persons living with HIV/AIDS. The program will also lay the groundwork for the care of the estimated 30,000 children orphaned by AIDS.
