= Saraha Georget Rabeharisoa =

Malagasy politician

Sarah Georget Rabeharisoa
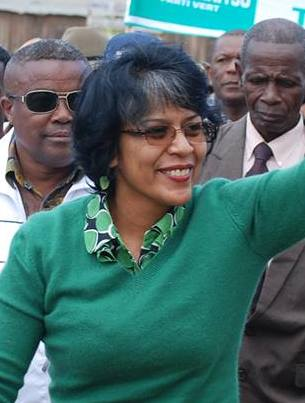

Leader of the Parti vert Hasin'i Madagasikara
- In office 31 January 2009 – 1 November 2013

Personal details
- Born: 1 May 1970 (age 56) Antananarivo, Madagascar
- Party: Parti vert Hasin'i Madagasikara
- Spouse: Alexandre Georget
- Education: Paris Dauphine University

Saraha Georget Rabeharisoa (born May 1, 1970 in Antananarivo, Madagascar) is a Malagasy politician and president of the Madagascar Green Party. She was a presidential candidate in the Malagasy presidential election in 2013.

== Biography ==
Mother of three children, Saraha Georget Rabeharisoa was born in Antananarivo, Madagascar in 1970. Her father, the late Rabeharisoa Samuel, was a public works engineer. Her mother, Raherivololona Henriette, is a doctor. She had her basic education (primary and secondary) in a Catholic school in the capital, Collège Saint Antoine, until obtaining a baccalaureate. She left Madagascar after college to continue her studies in France. In 1994, she obtained a master's degree in Internal Public Law at the University of Aix-en-Provence. In 1995 she continued with a graduate degree in Tax Administration at the Paris-Dauphine University.

== Career ==
At the end of her university studies, Saraha Georget Rabeharisoa returned to Madagascar to contribute to the development of the country. She began a teaching career then turned to sole-proprietorship by creating a transit and maritime consignment company.
