= Berevo =

- Location in Madagascar
- Coordinates: 19°44′S 44°58′E
- Country: Madagascar
- Region: Menabe
- District: Belo sur Tsiribihina
- Elevation: 51 m (167 ft)

Population (2001)
  - Total: 3,000
- Time zone: UTC3 (EAT)
- Postal code: 608

Berevo is a rural municipality in Madagascar. It belongs to the district of Belo sur Tsiribihina, which is a part of Menabe Region. The population of the commune was estimated to be approximately 3,000 in 2001 commune census.

Primary and junior level secondary education are available in town. Farming and raising livestock provides employment for 45% and 25% of the working population. The most important crop is rice, while other important products are cassava and tobacco. Services provide employment for 5% of the population. Additionally fishing employs 25% of the population.

== Rivers ==
Berevo is situated on the Tsiribihina River.

== Personalities ==
- Jean Ravelonarivo (*1959), former prime minister of Madagascar from 2015-2016.
