= AVANA =

Political party in Madagascar

AVANA (lit. 'rainbow'; short for the Malagasy: Antoko ny Vahoaka Aloha No Andrianina, lit. 'Party Where the People Are the Priority') is a political party in Madagascar that was created on 13 April 2013 by Jean-Louis Robinson, its current chairman. Its views are centrist, with the stated goal of steering away from the left-right conflict in the nation's politics.

== History ==
Robinson split off from the Rajoelina coalition to run in the 2013 general election. He was endorsed by former president Marc Ravalomanana, but still felt that he needed to found a party to ensure his credibility with voters. In April 2013, a few months before the election, he created the AVANA party with members of the humanitarian organization Vonjy Avana. Robinson finished second in the election, winning all the regions of Antananarivo Province.

However, after the election, AVANA created the ARD (Alliance for the Restoration of Democracy) coalition, of which it is the spearhead. The ARD is a coalition led by Robinson. The coalition currently consists of 32 parties and about 20 associations. The ARD is now a significant coalition in the Malagasy parliament.

AVANA is also one of the main parties of the alliance Ambodivona, which counted on the support of its 80 deputies to propose a prime minister to the president.
