= Chantal Radimilahy =

Malagasy archaeologist

- Citizenship: Madagascar
- Education: Sorbonne University; University of Uppsala
- Occupations: Archaeologist; curator; academic

Chantal Radimilahy is an archaeologist and museum curator from Madagascar. She was the first woman from the country to earn a PhD in Archaeology and the first woman to direct the Museum of Art and Archaeology at the University of Antananarivo.

== Career ==
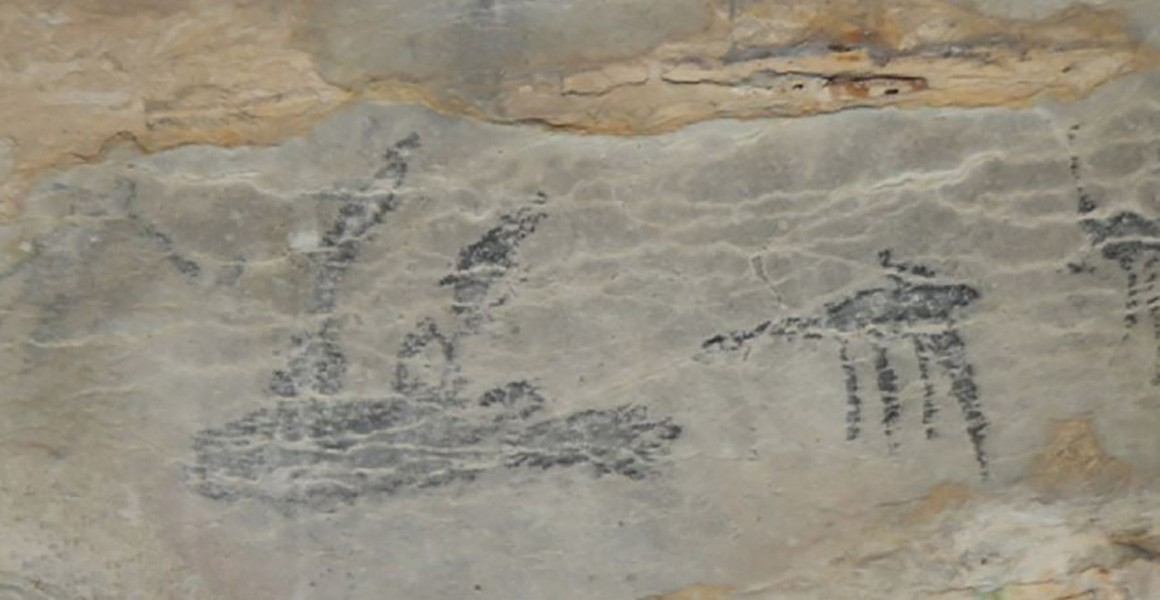
Sloth lemur from Andriamamelo Cave (Melaky)

Radimilahy was a doctoral researcher at the Sorbonne University in France between 1981 and 1985, where she studied prehistoric and protohistoric ethnology. Her thesis explored ancient iron-working in Madagascar. She then moved to the University of Uppsala where she studied for a second doctorate, which she was awarded in 1998. This second research project examined the town of Mahilaka, a medieval town in north west Madagascar. After completing these research projects, Radimilahy has continued to undertake field work at multiple sites in Madagascar and use preventative archeology to protect at-risk sites.

In addition to research, she has worked on the collection of Chinese ceramics held at the university museum, an important indicator of trade across the Indian Ocean. She has also spoken out about the need for preventative conservation at sites in Madagascar and the importance of communities being involved in that process. She has held prominent memberships and positions on different scientific and archeological societies, including being the chair for six years at the International Council of Museums (ICOM). Professor Radimilahy plays an active role in teaching and mentorship, and provides guidance and inspiration to her students, and the younger generation in Madagascar. As co-editor of People, Contacts, and the Environment in the African Past she enabled "a new generation of African archaeologists" to present their research to wider audiences.

Radimilahy's monograph Mahilaka was described as "a major contribution to African and Indian Ocean archaeology" by Mike Parker Pearson. She has acted as principle or co-investigator on a number of projects, including 'Sealinks' a partnership between academics from the Universities of Oxford, Bristol, Michigan, and Sydney and Museum of Art and Archaeology at the University of Antananarivo, which was designed to investigate early links between Madagascar and southeast Asia. She has also co-ordinated the MAGE program of genetic and ethnolinguistic research developed by the University of Bordeaux and the University of Toulouse.

== Selected publications ==
- Chantal M. Radimilahy & Zoë Crossland (2015) Situating Madagascar: Indian Ocean dynamics and archaeological histories, Azania: Archaeological Research in Africa, 50:4, 495–518.
- L’Ancienne Métallurgie du Fer à Madagascar (Oxford, 1988).
- Mahilaka: Excavations in an early town in North Western Madagascar (1998).
- David A. Burney, Julian P. Hume, Roger Randalana, Radosoa A. Andrianaivoarivelo, Owen Griffiths, Gregory J. Middleton, Tanambelo Rasolondrainy, Ramilisonina & Chantal Radimilahy (2020) Rock art from Andriamamelo Cave in the Beanka Protected Area of western Madagascar, The Journal of Island and Coastal Archaeology.
- Elmqvist T, Pyykönen M, Tengö M, Rakotondrasoa F, Rabakonandrianina E, Radimilahy C (2007) Patterns of Loss and Regeneration of Tropical Dry Forest in Madagascar: The Social Institutional Context. PLoS ONE 2(5): e402.
