= Parti Hiaraka Isika =

Political party in Madagascar

Parti Hiaraka Isika (English: Party with us; abbreviated PHI) is a political party in Madagascar, led by Albert Camille Vital. In the 2013 general election, the party won 5 seats.
