= Vondrona Politika =

Political party in Madagascar

Vondrona Politika Miara dia Malagasy Miara Miainga (English: Political-based groups working together; abbreviated VPM-MMM) is a political party in Madagascar, led by Milavonjy Andriasy. In the 2013 general election, the party won 13 seats.
