= Pillar of Madagascar =

Political party in Madagascar

The Pillar of Madagascar (Malagasy: Andrin'i Madagasikara; abbreviated AIM) is a political party in Madagascar, led by Andry Rakotovao. In the 2013 general election, the party won 2 seats.
