= 2013 Malagasy general election =

- Presidential election
- 25 October 2013 (first round); 20 December 2013 (second round)
- Turnout: 61.76% (first round); 50.72% (second round)
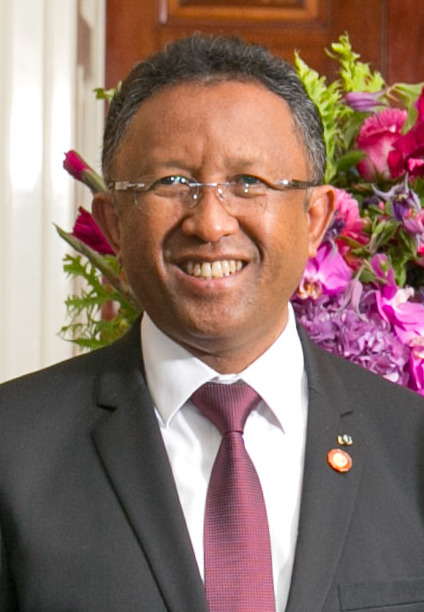

Nominee	Hery Rajaonarimampianina	Jean Louis Robinson
Party	HVM	AVANA
Popular vote	2,060,124	1,791,336
Percentage	53.49%	46.51%
- Results by region Rajaonarimampianina: 50–60% 60–70% 70–80% Robinson: 50–60% 60–70% 70–80%
President before election
Andry Rajoelina
Independent
Elected President
Hery Rajaonarimampianina
HVM
- National Assembly
- 20 December 2013
- 151 seats in the National Assembly; 76 seats needed for a majority
Party	Leader	Vote %	Seats
MAPAR	Andry Rajoelina	17.33	49
Ravalomanana Movement	Marc Ravalomanana	10.75	19
VPM MMM	Hajo Andrianainarivelo	8.29	14
Green		3.56	2
Hiaraka Isika		3.34	5
LEADER-Fanilo		2.81	5
FFF		1.73	2
Pillar of Madagascar		0.98	2
Trano Kasaka		0.56	2
Sambofiaran'i Noé		0.35	2
Parties with one seat		12.08	20
Independent		17.20	25
This lists parties that won seats. See the complete results below.
Prime Minister before	Prime Minister after
Jean Omer Beriziky; Independent	Jean Omer Beriziky; Independent

General elections were held in Madagascar on 20 December 2013, following a first round of presidential elections on 25 October. The presidential elections in December were a runoff between Jean Louis Robinson and Hery Rajaonarimampianina, the top two candidates to emerge from the first round of voting in October. The official results of the second round were announced on 7 January 2014 with Rajaonarimampianina proclaimed the victor with nearly 54% of the vote.

The last elected president, Marc Ravalomanana, was unconstitutionally removed from power by mass protests led by Mayor of Antananarivo Andry Rajoelina in early 2009. Rajoelina dissolved the Senate and National Assembly and took power as the president of the High Transitional Authority (HAT) he created to govern the country in the lead up to elections, which he promised to hold within 18 months. The HAT repeatedly delayed the parliamentary and presidential elections, which were scheduled separately for various dates before finally being merged in May 2011 and postponed to September 2011, May 2012, November 2012, May 2013, July 2013 and August 2013. The 2010 constitutional referendum introduced a new constitution that barred candidates who had not lived in Madagascar for the previous six months, effectively excluding opposition leaders living in exile, including Ravalomanana, who had resided in South Africa since his ouster.

The international community was actively involved in negotiating an end to the political impasse in Madagascar and maintained legitimate and transparent elections as a precondition to international recognition of Madagascar's head of state. In 2012 the African Union demanded that both top candidates - Rajoelina and Ravalomanana - withdraw their candidature. Ravalomanana accepted in December 2012, and Rajoelina followed suit in February 2013. Shortly afterward, Lalao Ravalomanana, wife of the former president, submitted her candidature, causing Rajoelina to add his name to the list of candidates just after the deadline; former president Didier Ratsiraka also submitted his candidature despite having returned from exile in France too recently to meet the six-month requirement. This prompted the international community to withdraw funding for the election then scheduled for May 2013, leading to further delays. All three candidates were removed from the approved list by an electoral court in August 2013, and the international community recommitted to providing financial support for the 2013 elections.

== Presidential elections ==
After becoming transitional President in March 2009, Andry Rajoelina announced that, within 24 months, there would be a new constitution and elections. Rajoelina was effectively handed the presidency on 18 March 2009, when the military handed over the executive power that was given to it by President Marc Ravalomanana upon his resignation. Rajoelina, as president of the High Transitional Authority which he had created weeks before Ravalomanana's resignation, announced he would serve as head of state until the next election. He became the youngest head of state in the country's history at 34 years of age.

On 13 May 2009 it was reported that Rajoelina had stated he did not want to run in the presidential election and that he only wanted to lay the groundwork. According to Rajoelina, he was prepared to accept a proposal from United Nations mediators that no former heads of state run in the election, but only if the other former heads of state also accepted the proposal. On 14 May, Ravalomanana ridiculed the proposal and said that "anyone who is legally eligible to run for president should be allowed to do so". On 23 May 2009 an agreement was reached that all former presidents would be allowed to stand in the election.

Rajoelina announced on 12 July 2009 that the election would be held by the end of 2009 to accommodate the demands of international investors, including the EU. This did not take place, however. In May 2010, the elections were set for 26 November 2010 and Rajoelina announced that he would not be a candidate, though he latter suggested that he was still considering running.

A constitutional referendum, originally scheduled for September 2009, was held in Madagascar on 17 November 2010, in which voters approved a proposal for the state's fourth Constitution. The new constitution contains a clause that requires presidential candidates to have lived in Madagascar for at least six months prior to the elections, effectively barring Ravalomanana, who has been living in exile and faces life in prison upon returning to Madagascar after being convicted in absentia for the deaths of protestors during the coup, from running in the next election. Ravalomanana and Rajoelina engaged in negotiations to allow for Ravalomanana's return to the country, but have failed to come to an agreement.

In April 2012 an amnesty law was passed, but it prevents the return of former president Marc Ravalomanana despite the South African Development Community's attempts at brokering a reconciliation agreement signed by all parties that would allow him to return. In December 2012, Ravalomanana agreed to withdraw his candidacy in compliance with the international community's roadmap to legitimate elections in Madagascar; Rajoelina followed suit two months later. However, when Ravalomanana's wife Lalao submitted her candidacy despite not having met the six-month residency requirement prior to doing so, Rajoelina likewise submitted his candidature after the deadline had officially closed. Former president Didier Ratsiraka also submitted his candidacy, despite also failing to meet the six-month residency requirement. Donors consequently pulled funding for the election, leading it to be postponed twice in 2013. In May 2013, the first round of the presidential elections was scheduled for 23 August 2013 alongside Parliamentary elections, with a second round of presidential elections in October if a runoff were needed. In September 2013, the first round of presidential elections was scheduled for 25 October, with a presidential run-off, if necessary, and parliamentary elections to be held on 20 December 2013.

In August 2013, the special electoral court decided to invalidate the candidacy of Rajoelina, Ravalomanana and Ratsiraka, thereby fulfilling a key criteria for legitimacy set forth by the international community. In August 2013, Foreign Minister Pierrot Rajaonarivelo and Finance Minister Hery Rajaonarimampianina resigned in order to run for the presidency.

Thirty-three presidential candidates were approved to appear on the final ballot used in the first round of voting held in October. None of the candidates won more than fifty percent of the vote, requiring a runoff in December to elect a new president. The candidate with the most votes (21.1%), Jean Louis Robinson, was the declared candidate of former president Ravalomanana. The second place candidate (15.93%), Hery Rajaonarimampianina, was named by Rajoelina as his preferred candidate.

In the second round of voting, held on 20 December, Rajaonarimampianina was elected president with 54% of the votes over Robinson won 46% of the vote, mainly in the densely populated central highlands around the capital of Antananarivo. The election was declared peaceful and legitimate by international observers, although both candidates accused the other of fraud. The results were announced by the electoral commission on 7 January 2014; the commission stated that the results would be officially confirmed on 18 February. Robinson conceded defeat in late January, and Rajaonarimampianina was sworn in as president in an inauguration attended by foreign dignitaries, including the French Ambassador and American Attache.

== Parliamentary elections ==
On 19 March 2009, Rajoelina dissolved the National Assembly of Madagascar and the Senate of Madagascar. Parliamentary elections were planned for 2011, after being postponed from 20 March 2010 and then 30 September 2010. Parliamentary and presidential elections were previously scheduled separately for various dates before finally being merged in May 2011 and postponed to September 2011, May 2012, November 2012, May 2013, July 2013 and August 2013.

Rajoelina announced on 16 December 2009 that parliamentary elections would be held in March 2010. In May, it was announced they would be held on 30 September 2010. On 14 August 2010, they were again postponed to 16 March 2011. Another postponement was announced in January 2011, with no new date specified. Parliamentary elections were held on 20 December 2013. It was the first time parliamentary elections were held concurrently with the presidential election.

== Presidential candidates ==
Thirty-three approved contenders ran in the 2013 presidential election. In August 2013, the three top candidates were barred from running by a Madagascar legal body charged with election oversight. These included Rajoelina, barred for not submitting his candidacy by the deadline; Lalao Ravalomanana, barred for not having lived in Madagascar for 6 months before the poll; and Didier Ratsiraka, barred for filing paperwork for the candidacy only 2 days after returning from exile. Ravalomanana publicly endorsed medical doctor and politician Jean Louis Robinson from Antananarivo. On 24 September 2013, the official starting date of the campaign, online news magazine Afrik.com identified the top candidates as Jean-Louis Robinson, Hery Rajaonarimampianina (endorsed by Andry Rajoelina), Hajo Andrianainarivelo, Camille Vital, Pierrot Rajaonarivelo and Saraha Georget Rabeharisoa.

== Results ==
=== President ===
Jean Louis Robinson and Hery Rajaonarimampianina emerged as the two candidates with the most votes in the first round held in October 2013, receiving 21% and 16% of the vote respectively. Election results for the second round, held in December 2013, were announced on 7 January. Rajaonarimampianina won with 53.5% of the vote while Robinson had 46.5%.

Candidate	Party	First round		Second round	
Candidate	Party	Votes	%	Votes	%
Hery Rajaonarimampianina	Hery Vaovao ho an'i Madagasikara	721,206	15.93	2,060,124	53.49
Jean Louis Robinson	AVANA	955,534	21.10	1,791,336	46.51
Hajo Andrianainarivelo	Malagasy Miara Miainga	476,153	10.51		
Roland Ratsiraka	MTS	407,732	9.00		
Albert Camille Vital	Parti Hiaraka Isika	310,253	6.85		
Saraha Georget Rabeharisoa	Madagascar Green Party	203,699	4.50		
Edgard Razafindravahy	Edgard Razafindravahy	197,081	4.35		
Pierrot Rajaonarivelo	MDM	121,999	2.69		
Joseph Martin Randriamampionona	RTM (Dadafara)	105,184	2.32		
Benjamin Radavidson Andriamparany	National Unity, Freedom & Development	100,890	2.23		
William Ratrema	GAM/PATRAM	96,715	2.14		
Jean Eugène Voninahitsy	LES AS	96,547	2.13		
Julien Razafimanazato	Eto Sehatry ny Daholo	72,875	1.61		
Monja Roindefo	Madagascar for the Malagasy	68,563	1.51		
Brigitte Ihantanirina Rabemananantsoa	AMP	62,652	1.38		
Willy Sylvain Rabetsaroana	PNJ Mazava Sylvain	57,829	1.28		
Clément Zafisolo Ravalisaona	AME	52,083	1.15		
Rakoto Andrianirina Fetison	RDS	49,599	1.10		
Tabera Randriamanantsoa	KINTANA	40,253	0.89		
Laza Razafiarison	Avotra Ho An'ny Firenena	39,952	0.88		
Jean Lahiniriko	KML	39,648	0.88		
Patrick Rajaonary	Vonjeo Madagasikara	38,934	0.86		
Rakotomaharo Rajemison	MAMAFISOA	38,827	0.86		
Roland Dieudonne Rabeharison	FAMA	32,157	0.71		
Djacoba Alain Tehindrazanarivelo	ENNA	25,974	0.57		
Faharo Ratsimbalson	Independent	24,536	0.54		
Patrick Raharimanana	Vitatsika Io	19,684	0.43		
Mickaël Brechard Dofo	MIM	15,538	0.34		
William Noelson	MITM	14,096	0.31		
Lezava Fleury Rabarison	HARENA	11,347	0.25		
Guy Ratrimoarivony	HOP	10,913	0.24		
Jean Pierre Rakoto	RJP	9,965	0.22		
Freddy Tinasoa	OBAMA	9,971	0.22		
Total		4,528,389	100.00	3,851,460	100.00
Valid votes		4,528,389	93.72	3,851,460	95.26
Invalid/blank votes		303,277	6.28	191,786	4.74
Total votes		4,831,666	100.00	4,043,246	100.00
Registered voters/turnout		7,823,305	61.76	7,971,790	50.72
Source: CENIT, HCC

=== National Assembly ===
Party	Votes	%	Seats
Together with President Andry Rajoelina	648,334	17.33	49
Ravalomanana Movement	402,121	10.75	19
Vondrona Politika Miara dia Malagasy Miara Miainga (VPM MMM)	310,119	8.29	14
Madagascar Green Party	133,147	3.56	2
Parti Hiaraka Isika	125,024	3.34	5
LEADER-Fanilo	105,039	2.81	5
Mientana Ho An'ny Demokrasia Et Madagasikara (MDM)	100,014	2.67	1
Malagasy Tonga Saina (MTS)	71,838	1.92	1
Firaisam-pirenena ho an'ny Fahafahana sy ny Fandrosoana (FFF)	64,868	1.73	2
Zanak i Dada	58,490	1.56	1
Antoko ny Vahoaka Aloha no Andrianina (AVANA)	41,882	1.12	0
Pillar of Madagascar	36,513	0.98	2
Ezaka Marina Mampandroso Antsika (EMMA)	35,821	0.96	0
Fanasina Ho Fampandrosoana	31,231	0.83	1
Firaisankina Ho An'ny Fanovana	29,449	0.79	0
Antoko Miombona Ezaka (AME)	26,991	0.72	0
PNJ MAZAVA	26,134	0.70	0
Malagasy Mandroso ao anatin ny Fihavanana sy ny Soatoavina (MAMAFISOA)	24,846	0.66	0
Les Autres Sensibilités (LES AS)	23,287	0.62	1
Madagasikara Fivoarana (MAFI)	22,467	0.60	0
Social Democratic Party of Madagascar (PSD)	21,037	0.56	1
Trano Kasaka	21,003	0.56	2
FANAMBY 88	20,689	0.55	1
Roso Ho Amin'ny Demokrasia Sosialy (RDS)	18,168	0.49	0
Madagascar for the Malagasy (MONIMA)	18,162	0.49	0
Fitambolagnela - Identité, Ambition, Developpement	16,917	0.45	0
Eto Sehatry ny Daholobe ou Espace de Solidarité pour le Developpement (ESD)	16,863	0.45	0
PAPASOLO	15,738	0.42	1
Union Nationale pour le Développement et le Patriotisme (UNDP)	15,177	0.41	0
Association Didier Ratsirakiste (ADR)	14,411	0.39	0
HARENA	14,097	0.38	1
Malagasy Revolutionary Party (AREMA)	13,190	0.35	0
Sambofiaran'i Noé	13,100	0.35	2
Fitarikandro	12,373	0.33	1
Ezaka Fampandrosoana An'antanifotsy	12,281	0.33	0
Tambatra	11,768	0.31	1
Gideona Fandresena Ny Fahantrana Eto Madagasikara (GFFM)	11,766	0.31	1
Alefa Madagasikara Hery Zo	11,558	0.31	0
Madagasikara Afaka (MAF)	11,365	0.30	0
Ensemble pour l'Intérêt de la Nation (ENINA)	10,738	0.29	0
Vahoaka Ihany	10,302	0.28	0
Mampiray Antsika	10,188	0.27	1
Malagasy Iray Tsy Mivaky (MITM)	9,445	0.25	0
303 Ihany Ny Antsika - Association des Jeunes Entrepreneurs d'Ambalavao	9,378	0.25	1
Mpirahalahy Mian'ala	9,311	0.25	1
Kongresy hoan ny Malagasy Liam-pivoarana (KML)	8,855	0.24	0
FIMAMI	8,568	0.23	0
Association Toliara Miaranga (ATM)	8,188	0.22	1
Fikambanan Ny Zanak Atsimondrano	8,029	0.21	0
Ampela Manao Politika (AMP)	7,997	0.21	0
BAINGA	7,668	0.20	1
Malagasy Miray sy Mifankatia (MAMIMI)	7,419	0.20	0
Vohibato Miray Hina	7,339	0.20	0
Malagasy Tompon Andraikitra Matoa	7,287	0.19	0
MISAFA	7,264	0.19	0
Raiso Ny Dimy	7,180	0.19	0
Iray Ny Malagasy	7,171	0.19	0
Tanindrazantsika Mivoatra (TAMI)	7,148	0.19	0
Association Zanak Ambanivolo	6,669	0.18	0
Gasy Manankarena No Tanjona (GMT)	6,360	0.17	0
Gasikara manan-kasina / Parti Travailliste Malagasy (GAM-PATRAM)	6,172	0.16	1
Komity Manohana An'i Edgard (KME)	6,085	0.16	0
Malagasy Sahy sy Mijoro (MASAH)	5,948	0.16	0
Taniko Madagasikara	5,856	0.16	0
Madagasikarantsika	5,587	0.15	0
Mpitolona ho an'ny Fandrosoan'i Madagasikara (MFM)	5,543	0.15	0
GRAD-Iloafo	5,445	0.15	0
Tanora Mandray Andraikitra (TMA)	5,251	0.14	1
A.TRA.BO.	5,114	0.14	0
MATSILO	5,069	0.14	0
Zakatsika "Hetsiky Ny Olom-Pirenena"	4,993	0.13	0
Hetsiky Ny Olom Pirenena Zakatsika	4,889	0.13	0
Action pour le Développement Humaniste et Ecologique de Madagascar (ADHEM FIZAFA)	4,856	0.13	1
Association Mitahy	4,789	0.13	0
Avotry Ny Taniko	4,748	0.13	0
Ambilobe Manongalaza	4,596	0.12	0
Front des Organisations Malagasy pour la Bienveillance de l'Avenir (FOMBA)	4,430	0.12	0
ZABEMI	4,328	0.12	0
FIAM	4,244	0.11	0
Ombilahy Marangitra	4,226	0.11	0
FIMA	4,128	0.11	0
KINTANA	3,961	0.11	0
Gasy Afaka, Saina Iray, Kolon-Tsaina Arafitra Hikojana Ny Olom-Pirenena (GASIKARAKO)	3,869	0.10	0
Tantsaha Mandroso	3,780	0.10	0
Ny Fanahy Maha Olona	3,646	0.10	0
Vahoaka Mijoro	3,641	0.10	0
FITAMIFA	3,566	0.10	0
Tanora Vognogno Hagnasoa (TVH)	3,544	0.09	0
Rodobe Matsilo	3,404	0.09	0
Gasy Tia Tanindrazana (GTT)	3,305	0.09	0
Vahoaka Miray (VAMI)	3,232	0.09	0
Association AMi	3,220	0.09	0
Tonga Ilay Nandrasana	3,185	0.09	0
Hery Vaovao Ho An'ny Betafo (HVB)	2,976	0.08	0
Tanora Miray (TAMI)	2,907	0.08	0
Ezaka ho an ny Rahampitso (EZRA)	2,832	0.08	0
ASA	2,772	0.07	0
SARIAKA	2,771	0.07	0
Miara-Mirona Amin'ny Fampandrosoana	2,654	0.07	0
AFAM	2,650	0.07	0
Firaisan Kina No Hery	2,638	0.07	0
Lohavohitsy Mifanolo Tagna (LMT)	2,510	0.07	0
Fikambanan Ny Zafin Iharana Mivoatra (FIZIM)	2,397	0.06	0
Ankazobe Mijoro	2,389	0.06	0
Ambilobe Miray Tsy Manavaka (AMTM)	2,382	0.06	0
Viavy Mandray Andraikitra	2,367	0.06	0
MAHEFA	2,224	0.06	0
Nosy Varika Miray	2,172	0.06	0
Antoky Ny Soa Ho An'ny Ho Avy (ASOA)	2,147	0.06	0
Malagasy Tia Tanindrazana (MATITA)	2,132	0.06	0
Avec 2002	2,117	0.06	0
FMTM	2,102	0.06	0
AFDM	2,093	0.06	0
Union Nationale pour la Démocratie et le Développement (UNDD)	2,089	0.06	0
Action des Jeunes pour le Developpement d'Atsimondrano (AJDA)	2,088	0.06	0
Gny Rano Voho Gny Fandriampahalema Ro Antoky Gny Fampandrosoana An'i Menabe	1,996	0.05	0
Mibanjina	1,979	0.05	0
Boriboritany Faha 6 Misandratra	1,976	0.05	0
Jeunes Espoirs de Madagascar (JEM)	1,945	0.05	0
Fikambanana Tsiry	1,939	0.05	0
UNDP RA SEFO	1,908	0.05	0
MMF	1,901	0.05	0
Nouveau Vent de Madagascar (NOVEMA)	1,891	0.05	0
Fiombonan'ny Bemiray Malagasy (FBM)	1,811	0.05	0
Tanora Miara Miainga	1,806	0.05	0
HIAROZO	1,745	0.05	0
Parti Démocrate-Chrétien Malagasy (PDCM)	1,742	0.05	0
Miara Mandroso	1,707	0.05	0
Zanak Avaratra	1,705	0.05	0
Fanjava Velogno	1,656	0.04	0
Antsiranana Miray Ho An'ny Fampandrosoana (AMF)	1,655	0.04	0
Tanora Avaradrano Mandray Andraikitra (TAMA)	1,638	0.04	0
Farimbona Ho An'i Madagasikara Vaovao	1,635	0.04	0
Plateforme HAT	1,579	0.04	0
Madagasikara Mandroso (MAMAN)	1,553	0.04	0
Tanjona Iraisana	1,552	0.04	0
FIVOY	1,527	0.04	0
SOLIDE	1,516	0.04	0
Ainga Vaovao	1,491	0.04	0
Firaisan-Kinan Ny Bongolava	1,460	0.04	0
Ho An Ny Mpiara Belona	1,442	0.04	0
VITAL Fampandrosoana	1,413	0.04	0
Association Jira	1,409	0.04	0
HFF	1,355	0.04	0
Antoko Fampandrosoana An'i Madagasikara (AFM)	1,352	0.04	0
MFV	1,292	0.03	0
Patience	1,265	0.03	0
Tsaralaza de Bemarivo	1,256	0.03	0
Zanak Ambohimanarina Mandray Andraikitra (ZAMA)	1,234	0.03	0
IRAY AINA	1,229	0.03	0
Sidilahy Sahy	1,225	0.03	0
Antokon'ny Kongresin'ny Fahaleovantenan'i Madagasikara (AKFM)	1,169	0.03	0
ADM	1,054	0.03	0
Fikambanana Ny Fanahy Maha Olona	1,049	0.03	0
MIAMI	1,045	0.03	0
Fiainam Baovao Takin Ankarabe (FIBATA)	1,035	0.03	0
Kintan'i Betafo	1,032	0.03	0
CRJM	1,026	0.03	0
AMADES	1,018	0.03	0
ARONNY VAHOAKA	1,007	0.03	0
As.Hu.Mi.	1,005	0.03	0
VMFM	995	0.03	0
Association Miezaka	991	0.03	0
Malagasy Vanona	973	0.03	0
Mamiratra Iombonan'ny Malagasy (MIM)	947	0.03	0
Asa Fanabeazana ho an'ny Be sy ny Maro (AFABE)	935	0.02	0
Fiaraha Mientana Ho Fampandrosoana Ny Faritra Ambohimanarina (3FA)	916	0.02	0
Refondation Totale de Madagascar (RTM)	914	0.02	0
TVM	897	0.02	0
Groupement Régional des Représentants des Associations et des Partis Politiques de l'Etat (GRAPPE)	890	0.02	0
Ny Fanahy No Maha Olona	884	0.02	0
Solofon'ny Firaisana Faharoa (SFF)	882	0.02	0
Groupement des Jeunes Mouvances Ravalomanana (GJMR)	873	0.02	0
Atrefa Madagasikara	863	0.02	0
SFDM	854	0.02	0
Hery Vaovao ho an'i Madagasikara	849	0.02	0
FILAMATRA	836	0.02	0
Malagasy Atambatry ny Soa ho an'ny Tanindrazana Ezaka ho an'izay Rehetra Sahy (MASTERS)	832	0.02	0
Fivondronan'ny Vahoaka Madinika Miavo-tena (FVMM)	775	0.02	0
Ny Soa Fianatsa	758	0.02	0
Association Flash-Mada	742	0.02	0
Fanambinana Madagasikara (FAMA)	719	0.02	0
Fihavanana Sy Firaisankina	706	0.02	0
MAMAZAY	687	0.02	0
F34 FMM	674	0.02	0
T@FA	659	0.02	0
Miray hina ho Fampandrosoana an i Manandriana (MIFAMA)	657	0.02	0
BEMIRAY	650	0.02	0
Fanevan'i Madagasikara	649	0.02	0
MIARA TAFITA	640	0.02	0
OLOM BAOVAO	634	0.02	0
IRAKA	627	0.02	0
Fikambanan ny panakanto Malagasy (FIMPAMA)	619	0.02	0
Plateforme des Militants pour la Défense de la République (PMDR)	619	0.02	0
Tanora Iharana Fandrosoana (TIF)	614	0.02	0
Tanora Ho Fanilon Ikalamavony (TFI)	613	0.02	0
ABAD	598	0.02	0
APDH	595	0.02	0
FANALAHIDY	550	0.01	0
Aingamben'ny Tia Tanindrazana Antoky ny Fampandrosoana (ATTAFA)	547	0.01	0
BRIMIMI	544	0.01	0
Ny Manandrify Tsa Mba Miolaka	526	0.01	0
Soa Ny Miara Dia	523	0.01	0
Komity Manohana An'i Lahiniriko (KLM)	506	0.01	0
Association Miara Mamindra	492	0.01	0
Tanora Sahy Sy Vonona	481	0.01	0
Vehivavin Ny Kandreho Mandray Andraikitra	475	0.01	0
Rassemblement pour la Démocratie Républicaine (RDR)	473	0.01	0
Professeurs Chargés de Mission e l'Education	464	0.01	0
Hery Politika Mitambatra (HPM)	460	0.01	0
Tanora Mivoatse	451	0.01	0
Vahoaka Mandroso	449	0.01	0
MAYE	431	0.01	0
Atsika Jiaby	426	0.01	0
KMDT	424	0.01	0
Ny fanahy no vatsy	410	0.01	0
FITELO	393	0.01	0
Malagasy Sambatra (MASA)	393	0.01	0
FAPHA Ambositra	390	0.01	0
Fikambanan'ny Tanora Mpitolona Malagasy (FTPM)	386	0.01	0
Zanak i Madagasikara	372	0.01	0
Irakin Ny Vavarano Fampandrosoana (IVF)	361	0.01	0
Vaovao	360	0.01	0
MA.MI.TA.	355	0.01	0
Fikambanana Maro Zanaka (FMZA)	354	0.01	0
Avotako Imamo	342	0.01	0
ONG Harena Manasoa	338	0.01	0
OMDHL	321	0.01	0
Fahamarinana Sy Fahazavana Ho Fandrosoana An'i Madagasikara (3FAMA)	306	0.01	0
Hery Vaovao Ho Anantsirabe	305	0.01	0
4M	290	0.01	0
MANITRA	281	0.01	0
HBM	280	0.01	0
Vondrona Tia Tanindrazana (VTT)	277	0.01	0
Malagasy Filamatra	267	0.01	0
Tanora Andrin Ny Fampandrosoana (TAFA)	246	0.01	0
NOMAMIMA	225	0.01	0
Diego Miara-Mientana	216	0.01	0
Association Lalam Baovao	204	0.01	0
Malagasy Malaigny Raha Ratsiratsy	201	0.01	0
Isika Tanora Miasa	190	0.01	0
Eto Sehatry Ny Demokrasia (ESD)	189	0.01	0
Tanora Miaro Ny Demokratika (TMD)	186	0.00	0
Firaisankina Ho An'ny Firenena	162	0.00	0
Groupe d'Actions et de Réflexion pour la Défense des Usagers et des Consommateurs (GARDUC)	157	0.00	0
Betafo Mandroso	156	0.00	0
Tanora Malagasy Miroso (TAMAMI)	151	0.00	0
Union Nationale Malagasy Démocrate (UNAMAD)	150	0.00	0
AJNM	135	0.00	0
FJDM	129	0.00	0
DHD	126	0.00	0
Solofo Dimby Vanona (SDV)	126	0.00	0
MAVANA	124	0.00	0
Avotantsika Miaraka i Madagasikara (AMM)	110	0.00	0
Tanora Vonona Hiasa	108	0.00	0
MJF	102	0.00	0
FANAVOTAM-BAHOAKA	100	0.00	0
VITATSIKA	93	0.00	0
Hampisandratra An I Merina	89	0.00	0
MANA	75	0.00	0
Sahia Mijoro	68	0.00	0
Vahaolana	59	0.00	0
Soa Ny Antsika	57	0.00	0
Independent	643,412	17.20	25
Invalidated			4
Total	3,740,981	100.00	151
Valid votes	3,740,981	94.92	
Invalid/blank votes	200,108	5.08	
Total votes	3,941,089	100.00	
Registered voters/turnout	7,781,036	50.65	
Source: HCC, Election Passport

== Aftermath ==
=== 2014 by-elections ===
After the parliamentary elections results in the districts of Ambanja, Marovoay, Sainte Marie, and Belo Sur Tsiribihina were invalidated, there were rerun elections held on 29 August 2014.

Party	Votes	%	Seats
Vondrona Politika Miara dia Malagasy Miara Miainga (VPM MMM)	11,053	14.86	1
Parti Hiaraka Isika	8,122	10.92	1
Together with President Andry Rajoelina	7,388	9.93	0
Malagasy Revolutionary Party (AREMA)	4,444	5.97	0
Madagasikara Mandroso (MAMAN)	2,447	3.29	0
Antoko ny Vahoaka Aloha no Andrianina (AVANA)	1,519	2.04	0
Malagasy Mandroso ao anatin ny Fihavanana sy ny Soatoavina (MAMAFISOA)	1,088	1.46	0
Ravalomanana Movement	1,031	1.39	0
Madagascar Green Party	817	1.10	0
Antoko Miombona Ezaka (AME)	801	1.08	0
Zanak i Dada	676	0.91	0
LEADER-Fanilo	522	0.70	0
Gideona Fandresena Ny Fahantrana Eto Madagasikara (GFFM)	515	0.69	0
Malagasy Tonga Saina (MTS)	500	0.67	0
HARENA	260	0.35	0
Firaisam-pirenena ho an'ny Fahafahana sy ny Fandrosoana (FFF)	252	0.34	0
PNJ MAZAVA	188	0.25	0
Mpitolona Ho An'ny Fandrosoan'i Madagasikara (MFM)	172	0.23	0
Roso Ho Amin'ny Demokrasia Sosialy (RDS)	156	0.21	0
Les Autres Sensibilités (LES AS)	141	0.19	0
Ensemble pour l'Intérêt de la Nation (ENINA)	131	0.18	0
Ampela Manao Politika (AMP)	121	0.16	0
Malagasy Iray Tsy Mivaky (MITM)	103	0.14	0
Gasy Manankarena No Tanjona (GMT)	95	0.13	0
Ezaka Marina Mampandroso Antsika (EMMA)	64	0.09	0
OBAMA	38	0.05	0
Mibanjina	26	0.03	0
Independent	31,730	42.65	2
Total	74,400	100.00	4
Valid votes	74,400	96.20	
Invalid/blank votes	2,942	3.80	
Total votes	77,342	100.00	
Registered voters/turnout	190,757	40.54	
Source: HCC, Election Passport
