= Roseline Emma Rasolovoahangy =

Malagasy politician

Roseline Emma Rasolovoahangy is a Malagasy scientist, entrepreneur, environmental advocate, and a public servant. She was a candidate in the Madagascar presidential elections of 2013 and 2018.

== Regenerating Madagascar's ecosystems ==
At the moment, Emma Rasolovoahangy is working on projects that involve restoration of large-scale ecosystems as well as creation of employment and food resilience through land and ocean regeneration in Madagascar. This will greatly contribute towards combating climate change.

== Political and civic experience ==
Emma Rasolovoahangy first ran for President of Madagascar in the 2013 elections. At that time, her campaign themes included leadership, prosperity, and true independence in a New Madagascar, and focused specifically on reducing poverty, developing infrastructure, attracting overseas investment, and stimulating job growth. Rasolovoahangy traveled around Madagascar, meeting with villagers in a campaign called the Emma Listening Tour Program.

She ran for a second time in 2018, and gained support from several political parties, organizations, and associations.

She currently serves as president of the Ezaka Mampandroso Antsika (E.M.A.) political party, and president and founder of the Ezaka Marina Mampandroso Antsika (E.M.M.A.) association, with 420 offices and 117,000 members throughout Madagascar.

Emma is also President and Founder of Malagasy Mivoatra ny Tanjona (M.M.T), a non-governmental organization with a focus on poverty alleviation, whose goal is to increase the living standard of Malagasy households.

== Professional career ==
Emma Rasolovoahangy is the Founder and CEO of ASE PPP sarl, a "public private people" partnership dedicated to fishery restoration, cement production, construction, and water projects in Madagascar.

She is also the Founder and President of MinMad S.R.A.L., a company focused on mining, energy, agribusiness, and infrastructure projects in Madagascar.

She is also the Founding President of Petromad (Mauritius) Limited. Petromad holds rights to the Bezaha exploration located in the Morondava Oil Basin, south-west of Madagascar. She is the first native Malagasy to win a bid for a concession to search for oil in Madagascar. Since Petromad's establishment in 2005, more than 300 jobs have been created for Malagasy workers.

Emma has 25 years of experience working in the oil and gas industry with Shell International E&P, Anadarko Petroleum, VRMT International, in Houston, TX, USA.

== Early life and education ==
Emma Rasolovoahangy was born in the city of Fianarantsoa, Madagascar in 1967. She is the second of eight children; both of her parents are teachers. She is married with two children.

Her early education was in Antananarivo. In 1984, she was the captain of the national women's basketball team. Subsequently, her three months of basic military training led to a junior high teaching assignment in a remote rural village. In 1991, she majored in Natural Gas Engineering and graduated with a Master of Science from the Algerian Institute of Petroleum in Algeria. Afterwards, she went to Texas A&M University in the United States, where she graduated with a Master of Science, Petroleum Engineering and Environmental Engineering in 1994. Determined to expand her portfolio and skills, she graduated with Master (2000) and Ph.D. degrees in geophysics (2002) from Stanford University.
