= University of Madagascar's Museum of Art and Archaeology =

Museum of Art and Archaeology
- Established: 1970
- Location: Isoraka, Antananarivo
- Coordinates: 18.9118°S 47.5208°E
- Type: Ethnology museum, Paleontology museum
- Director: Chantal Radimilahy

University of Madagascar's Museum of Art and Archaeology is a museum located in Isoraka in Antananarivo, Madagascar. It is operated by the University of Antananarivo and was established on January 27, 1970. The director of the museum is Chantal Radimilahy, the first woman from Madagascar to earn a PhD in archaeology.
