= Madagascar Green Party =

Political party in Madagascar

Madagascar Green Party Antoko Maitso Hasin’i Madagasikara Parti vert Hasin'i Madagasikara
- President: Alexandre Georget
- Founded: June 2009
- Headquarters: Antananarivo
- Ideology: Green politics Ecologism
- Political position: Centre-left
- Regional affiliation: Federation of Green Parties of Africa
- International affiliation: Global Greens
- Seats in the National Assembly: 2 / 147

Website
- http://hasinimadagasikara.mg

The Madagascar Green Party/Parti Vert (Malagasy: Antoko Maitso Hasin’i Madagasikara, AMHM) is a political party in Madagascar, led by Alexandre Georget. In the 2013 general election, the party won 2 seats.
