= Jean Louis Robinson =

Malagasy politician

AVANA candidate for President of Madagascar
- Election date 20 December 2013
- Opponent: Hery Rajaonarimampianina
- Incumbent: Andry Rajoelina

Personal details
- Born: 22 March 1952 (age 74)
- Party: AVANA
- Children: 2
- Profession: Politician, medical doctor
- Website: www.robinson2013.mg

Jean-Louis Richard Robinson (born 22 March 1952) is a Malagasy politician and medical doctor.

Robinson was the top contender in the first round of the 2013 general election held in September 2013. He lost the run-off against Hery Rajaonarimampianina in the second round of presidential elections held in December 2013, earning 46.5% of the vote against 53.5% for Rajaonarimampianina. Robinson served in the government of Madagascar as Minister of Health under President Marc Ravalomanana, and he was the Ravalomanana camp's candidate in the 2013 election.

== Political career ==
He had been twice the minister of health from 2004 to 2006 (in the government of Jacques Sylla) and from 2007 to 2008 (in the government of Charles Rabemananjara) before being named mister of sports in the same government of Rabemananjara from 2008 to 2009.

== Ambassador ==
He was appointed ambassador of Madagascar in China on 2019.
