= Order of La Pléiade =

Award of the Francophonie

Order of La Pléiade Ordre de la Pléiade
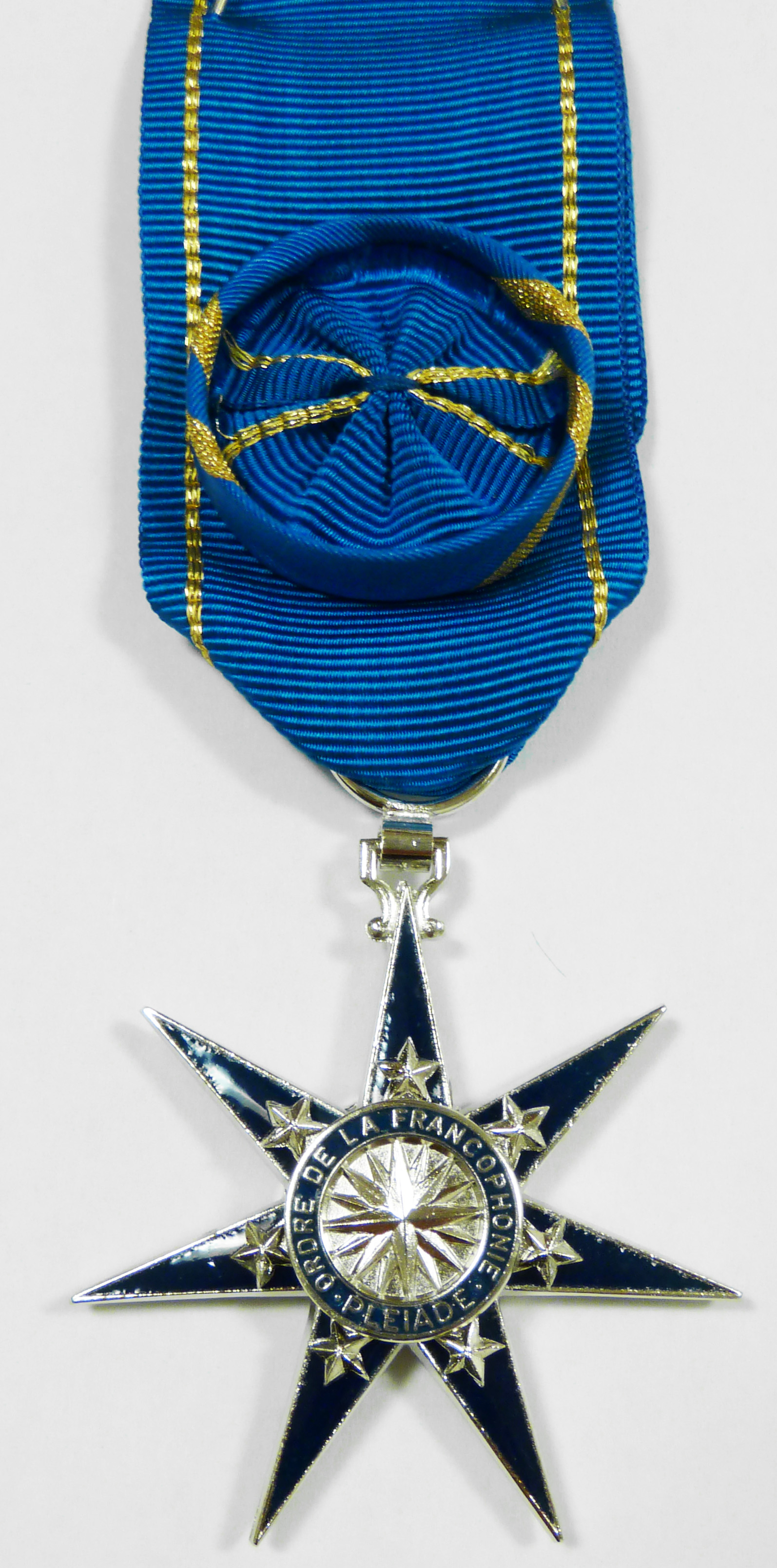
- Insignia of the Officer's Cross
- Status: Currently constituted
- Grades: Grand Cross; Grand Officer; Commander; Officer; Knight

Statistics
- First induction: 1976
- Ribbon bar of the order

The Order of La Pléiade (French pronunciation: [la ple.jad]; French: Ordre de la Pléiade de l'Association des parlementaires de langue française) is an honorary order of the Organisation internationale de la Francophonie. It recognizes people who particularly distinguished themselves in the service of its ideals of cooperation and friendship, promoting the role of the French language in their own countries or in the world. It was created in 1976 on initiative of the Assemblée parlementaire de la Francophonie.

== Origin of the name ==
In this reverse chronological list, each item intentionally referred to the following (historically preceding) one:

1. Order of La Pléiade;
2. La Pléiade, a group of (originally seven) French Renaissance poets;
3. the Alexandrian Pleiad of seven Alexandrian poets and tragedians (3rd century B.C.);
4. the seven main stars of the Pleiades star cluster in the western astronomical tradition, and the Pleiades, seven sisters in the Greek mythology.

== Classes ==
There are five classes (in descending order of precedence):

1. Grand Cross (Grand-croix)
2. Grand Officer (Grand Officier)
3. Commander (Commandeur)
4. Officer (Officier)
5. Knight (Chevalier)

== Insignia ==
The badge of the Order of La Pléiade is a seven-pointed star, blue enameled at both sides. The obverse silver central disc features a silver-colored compass rose, surrounded by a blue enamel and silver edged ring with the text "la Pléiade, ordre de la Francophonie", itself surrounded by seven small silver stars. The reverse silver central disc features the Adolphe Bridge in Luxembourg, where the Assemblée parlementaire de la Francophonie was founded, and symbolizes unity.

The ribbon is sky blue with small yellow stripes near each border.
