= National Unity, Freedom & Development =

Political party in Madagascar

National Unity, Freedom & Development (Malagasy: Firaisam-pirenena ho an'ny Fahafahana sy ny Fandrosoana; abbreviated FFF) is a political party in Madagascar, led by Andriamparany Benjamin Radavidson. In the 2013 general election, the party won 2 seats.
