= Parliament of Madagascar =

Legislative body of Madagascar

Parliament of Madagascar Antenimieran' i Madagasikara Parlement de Madagascar

Type
- Type: Unicameral (de facto) Bicameral
- Houses: National Assembly; Senate (suspended)
- Seats: 163 (National Assembly)

Elections
- National Assembly voting system: single and two-member constituencies

Meeting place
- Antananarivo

Website
- Assembly; Senate

The Parliament of Madagascar (Malagasy: Antenimieran' i Madagasikara; French: Parlement de Madagascar) has two chambers:

- The National Assembly (Malagasy: Antenimieram-Pirenena / French: Assemblée Nationale) has 163 members, elected for five-year terms in single-member and two-member constituencies
- The Senate (Malagasy: Antenimierandoholona / French: Sénat) was 18 members. 12 are elected, one from each district of Madagascar, and 6 more are appointed by the President, all for five-year terms.

== See also ==
- Politics of Madagascar
- List of legislatures by country
