= University of Antananarivo =

Public university in Madagascar

- French: Université d'Antananarivo
- Former name: University of Madagascar
- Type: Public
- Established: 16 December 1955; 70 years ago
- President: Raoul Mamy Ravelomanana
- Students: 40000
- Location: Antananarivo, Madagascar; 18.9152°S 47.5558°E
- Website: www.univ-antananarivo.mg

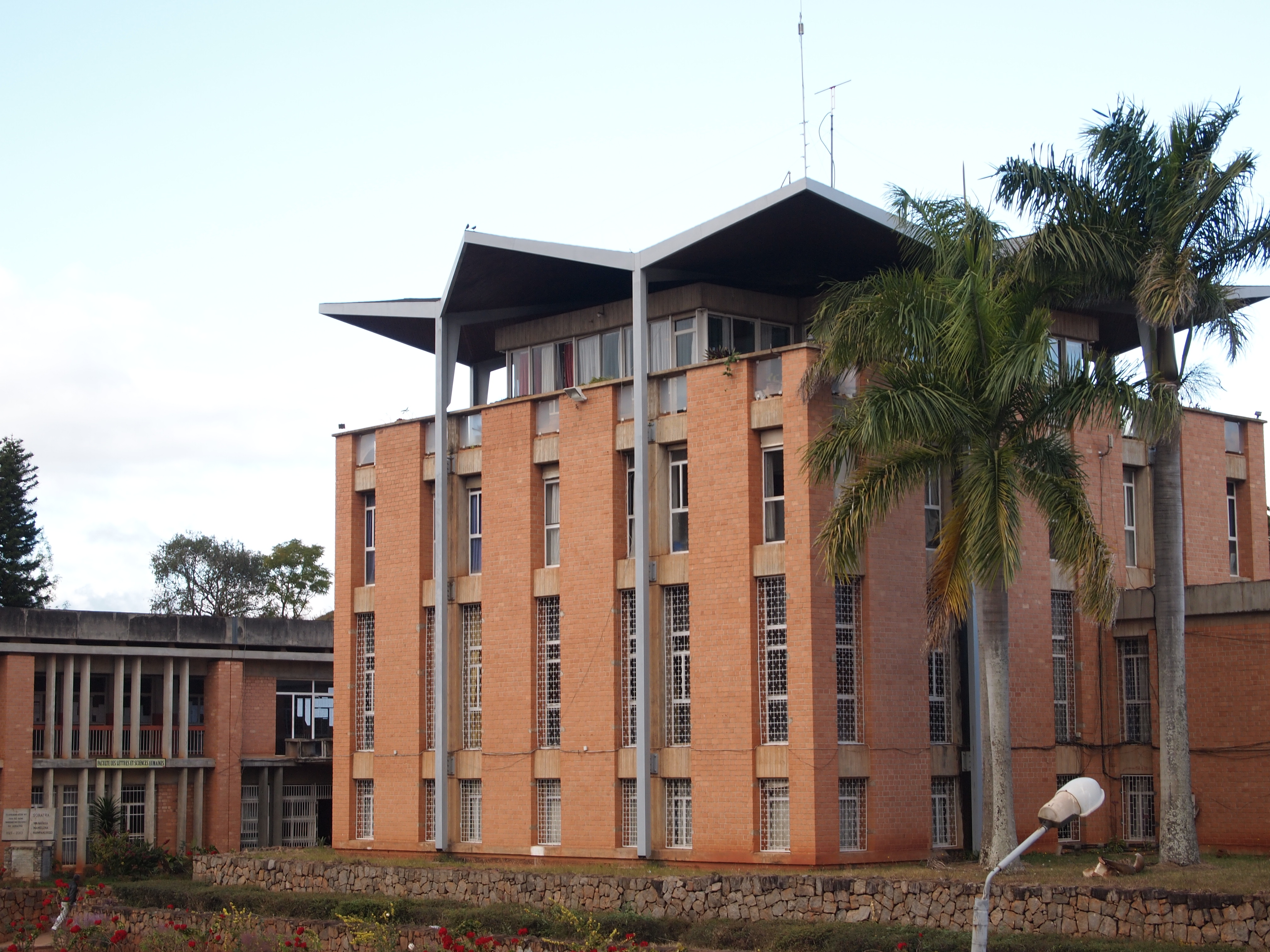
University of Antananarivo, in Antananarivo, Madagascar.

University of Antananarivo (French: Université d'Antananarivo) is the primary public university of Madagascar, located in the capital Antananarivo.

== History ==
The university traces its founding to 16 December 1955 and the formation of the Institute for Advanced Studies in Antananarivo. It established itself as the main center for higher education in the country, and was renamed the University of Madagascar in 1961. It later opened five more branches in Antsiranana, Fianarantsoa, Toamasina, Toliara, and Mahajanga.

Robert Mallet taught in Madagascar from 1959 to 1964, where he founded the Faculty of Letters at the University of Antananarivo, of which he was the first Dean.

The University of Antananarivo runs the Museum of Arts and Archaeology. The Institute of Higher Education of Soavinandriana Itasy and the Institute of Higher Education of Antsirabe Vakinankaratra are its two regional branches.

With the Ministère de l’Enseignement Supérieur et de la Recherche Scientifique (Ministry of Higher Education), staff of the university oversee MadaRevues, a website compilation of scientific journals published in Madagascar. PDF articles are viewable for free.

The university, in conjunction with UNESCO, has begun digitizing its archives. The archives include rare documents written with the Sorabe alphabet.

== Sports ==
The university's sports facilities were used for the official 2011 African Basketball Championship.

== Notable people ==
- Chantal Radimilahy, Madagascar's first woman archaeologist and director of the Museum of Arts and Archaeology.
- Hery Rajaonarimampianina, Malagasy politician who served as the sixth President of Madagascar from 2014 to 2018, resigning to run for re-election.

== See also ==
- List of universities in Madagascar
- Education in Madagascar
