= Albert Camille Vital =

Former Prime Minister of Madagascar

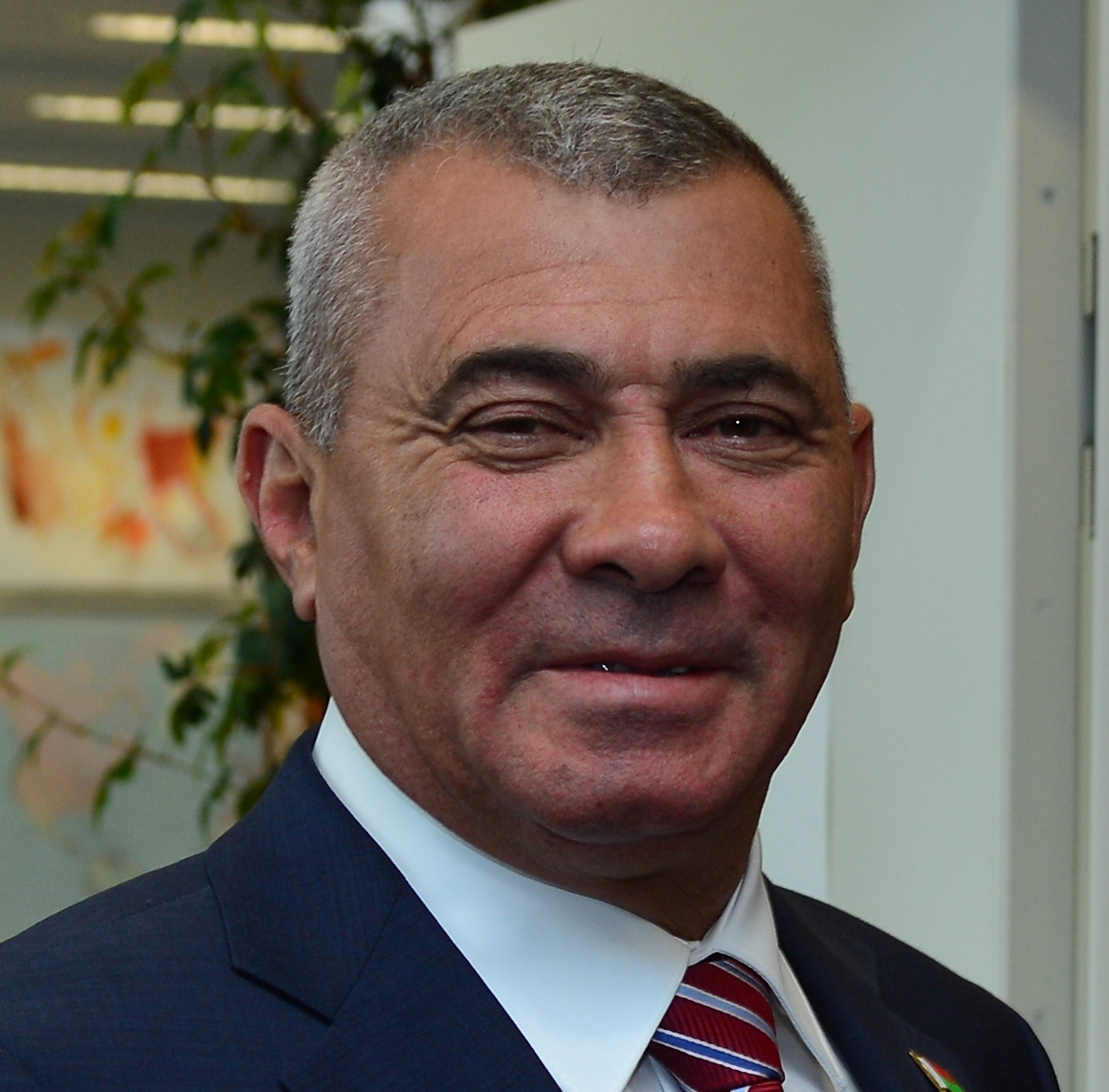

23rd Prime Minister of Madagascar
- In office 20 December 2009 – 2 November 2011
- President: Andry Rajoelina
- Preceded by: Cécile Manorohanta (Acting)
- Succeeded by: Omer Beriziky

Personal details
- Born: 18 July 1952 (age 74) Toliara, French Madagascar
- Party: Parti Hiaraka Isika
- Education: Special Military School of Saint Cyr

Brigadier General Albert Camille Vital (born 18 July 1952) is a Malagasy army officer, politician and civil engineer who was Prime Minister of Madagascar from 2009 to 2011 after the 2009 coup d'état. He is the president of Parti Hiaraka Isika.

== Life and career ==
Vital was born in the city of Toliara, in southern Madagascar. Trained in the Soviet Union, Vital was Chief of the Technical Office of the State Forces Staff Development (1987–1991), and then appointed corps commander of the first regiment of the Military Region No. 5 Toliara (1998–2001) before training at the Ecole Supérieure de Guerre in Paris from 2001 to 2002.

On 20 December 2009, Vital was appointed as Prime Minister by President Andry Rajoelina, succeeding Eugène Mangalaza. After nearly two years in office, Vital was succeeded by Omer Beriziky on 28 October 2011.

After serving as Prime Minister, Vital was appointed as Permanent Representative to the United Nations Office at Geneva; he presented his credentials as Permanent Representative in August 2012. He stood as the candidate of the Parti Hiaraka Isika in the October 2013 presidential election, placing fifth with 6.85% of the vote. He supported Jean-Louis Robinson, the candidate associated with Marc Ravalomanana, in the second round of voting, held in December 2013.

Vital was named as ambassador to Mauritius in September 2018.

In the 2023 presidential election, Vital endorsed incumbent president Andry Rajoelina.

Political offices
Preceded by Cécile Manorohanta; Acting	Prime Minister of Madagascar; 2009–2011	Succeeded by Omer Beriziky
