= Jean Ravelonarivo =

Malagasy military officer and politician

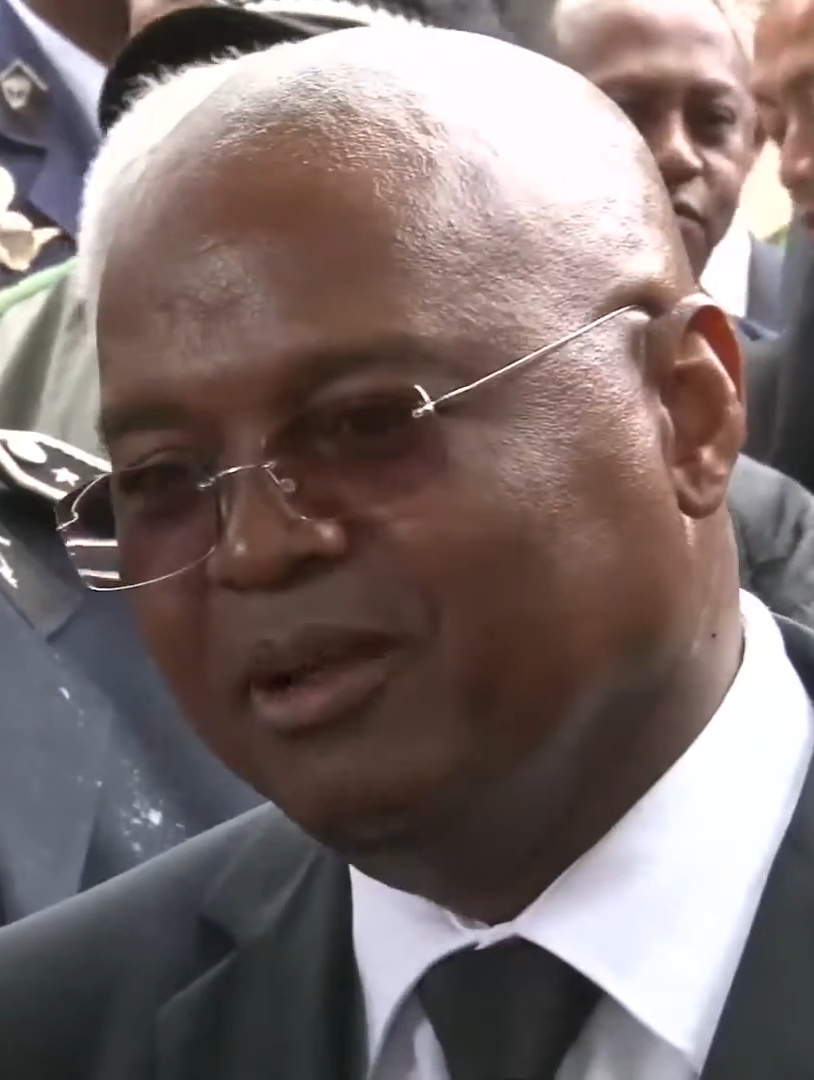

26th Prime Minister of Madagascar
- In office 17 January 2015 – 13 April 2016
- President: Hery Rajaonarimampianina
- Preceded by: Roger Kolo
- Succeeded by: Olivier Mahafaly Solonandrasana

Personal details
- Born: 17 April 1959 (age 66) Sakadomo, Madagascar
- Party: Independent

Jean Ravelonarivo (born 17 April 1959) is a Malagasy military officer and politician who was Prime Minister of Madagascar from 17 January 2015 to 13 April 2016.

== Career ==
Ravelonarivo was born on 17 April 1959 in Sakadomo, Berevo, Madagascar. He was a pilot stationed at the Ivato Aeronaval Base between 1985 and 1997.

Ravelonarivo was appointed successor to Prime Minister Roger Kolo on 17 January 2015. Opposition members Andry Rajoelina, Jean Louis Robinson and Albert Camille Vital complained over the appointment because Ravelonarivo's wife is close friends with President Rajaonarimampianina's wife. He presented his cabinet on 23 January.

On 8 April 2016 it was announced that Ravelonarivo along with his cabinet resigned from their posts. Ravelonarivo denied the announcement that he had resigned although he would tender resignation at a "a more opportune moment". On 10 April President Rajaonarimampianina named Olivier Mahafaly as new prime minister. Ravelonarivo subsequently stated that he would sign a letter of resignation.

In September 2021, the criminal court of the Antananarivo anti-corruption pole called for six individuals and a company to appear. Jean Ravelonarivo, Prime Minister between 2015 and 2016 and direct beneficiary of fraudulent contracts, five years in prison were required against him. The defendants were ordered to pay a total of 6 billion ariary in damages to the CNAPS, the civil party in this case.

== Fleeing criminal sentence ==
On October 16, 2021 he arrived onboard of a small vessel in Mayotte that he quit on October 22, 2021 on a regular flight to Paris. He was in possession of a regular immigration visa, established in Madagascar by the French authorities. He is expected to settle in Switzerland.

Political offices
Preceded by Roger Kolo	Prime Minister of Madagascar; 2015–2016	Succeeded by Olivier Mahafaly Solonandrasana
