= Stephan Narison =

Malagasy physicist

- Born: Stephan Narison; 17 September 1951 (age 74); Antsakabary, Madagascar
- Education: Antananarivo University, Madagascar; Aix-Marseille University, France
- Known for: Quantum Chromodynamics (QCD)
- Scientific career
- Fields: High-Energy Physics
- Workplaces: LUPM, CNRS-IN2P3 and Montpellier 2 University
- Doctoral advisor: Prof. Eduardo de Rafael

Stephan Narison is a Malagasy theoretical high-energy physicist specialized in quantum chromodynamics (QCD), the gauge theory of strong interactions. He is the founder of the Series of International Conferences in Quantum Chromodynamics (QCD-Montpellier) and of the Series of International Conferences in High-Energy Physics (HEPMAD-Madagascar).

He works on QCD spectral sum rules (QSSR) or SVZ sum rules which have been introduced by M.A. Shifman, A.I. Vainshtein and V.I. Zakahrov for studying the non-perturbative dynamics of hadrons.

== Scientific contributions ==
Among his various publications (237 papers as of January 2014), his most famous work is the first determination of the QCD coupling α_{s} from hadronic heavy lepton τ-decays where the running of α_{s} from the τ-mass until the Z-boson mass demonstrates its 1/log Q^2 behavior predicted by asymptotic freedom.

He has contributed to the definition of the running and invariant quark masses in QCD and on the tests of the gluonium/glueball nature of the scalar meson σ/f_{0}(500) using QSSR, ππ and γγ scatterings data. His important estimates of the light and heavy quark masses and leptonic heavy-light mesons decay constants are compiled in the Particle Data Group (PDG).

He has also contributed to the QCD U(1) anomaly effect in the spin of the proton and on the parametrization of the non-calculated higher order terms of the perturbative series in terms of the square of the tachyonic gluon mass not included in the standard Wilson Operator Product Expansion (OPE).

He has contributed to the estimation of the hadronic contribution to the muon anomalous magnetic moment a_{μ}=(g_{μ}-2)/2.

== Selected bibliography ==
- Techniques of Dimensional Renormalization and Applications to the Two Point Functions of QCD and QED, Phys. Rep. 84 (1982) 263.
- QCD Spectral Sum Rules, World Scientific Publishing Company, 1990.
- QCD as a Theory of Hadrons: from partons to confinement, Cambridge Monographs on Particle Physics, Nuclear Physics and Cosmology, Vol 17 (2004).
- HEP-MAD '01: Proceedings of the First Madagascar International Conference on High-Energy Physics, Antananarivo, Madagascar 27 September – 5 October 2001.
- QCD-Montpellier Conference Series, Nuclear Physics, Proceedings Supplements.
- Particles and the Universe: From the Ionian School to the Higgs Boson and Beyond (World Scientific, 2016).

== Awards ==
- 1981-82: Fellow at the CERN Theory division.
- 1987-91 : Deutsche Forschungs Gemeinschaft (DFG) fellowship for a qualified Researcher at the University of Heidelberg.
- 1992 : Alexander-von-Humboldt Foundation, Research Senior Fellow at the University of Heidelberg.
- 2000 : Japan Society for Promotion of Sciences (JPS) Associate Professor at KEK-Tsukuba.
- 2010-2013: ICTP-Trieste consultant for developing science in Madagascar.

== Honors and appearances ==
Stephan Narison belongs to different scientific societies:

- 2000: Outstanding Man of the 20th century by the American Biographical Institute (ABI).
- 1998: Outstanding People of the 20th century by the International Biographical Centre (Cambridge.
- 1998: Included in the Marquise Who's Who in science and engineering.
- 1996: Included in the International Directory of Distinguished Leadership by ABI.
- 1995: Invited member of the New-York Academy of Science.
- 1993: Invited member of the American Association for the Advancement of Science.
- 1983: Member of the French and European Physical Societies.

For a recognition of his actions for developing science in Madagascar, he has been nominated as:

- 2012: Associate Member of the Malagasy Academy of Sciences.
- 2011: Grand Officier de l'Ordre National Malgache.
- 2006: Commandeur de l'Ordre National Malgache.

== Associations ==
For developing science in Madagascar, he founded two associations where he is the honorary President:

- 2010: Association Gasy Miara-Mandroso (AGMM) in Madagascar.
- 1993: Association Culturelle Malgache de Montpellier (ACMM)in France.
