= Omer Beriziky =

Malagasy politician and diplomat

Jean Omer Beriziky
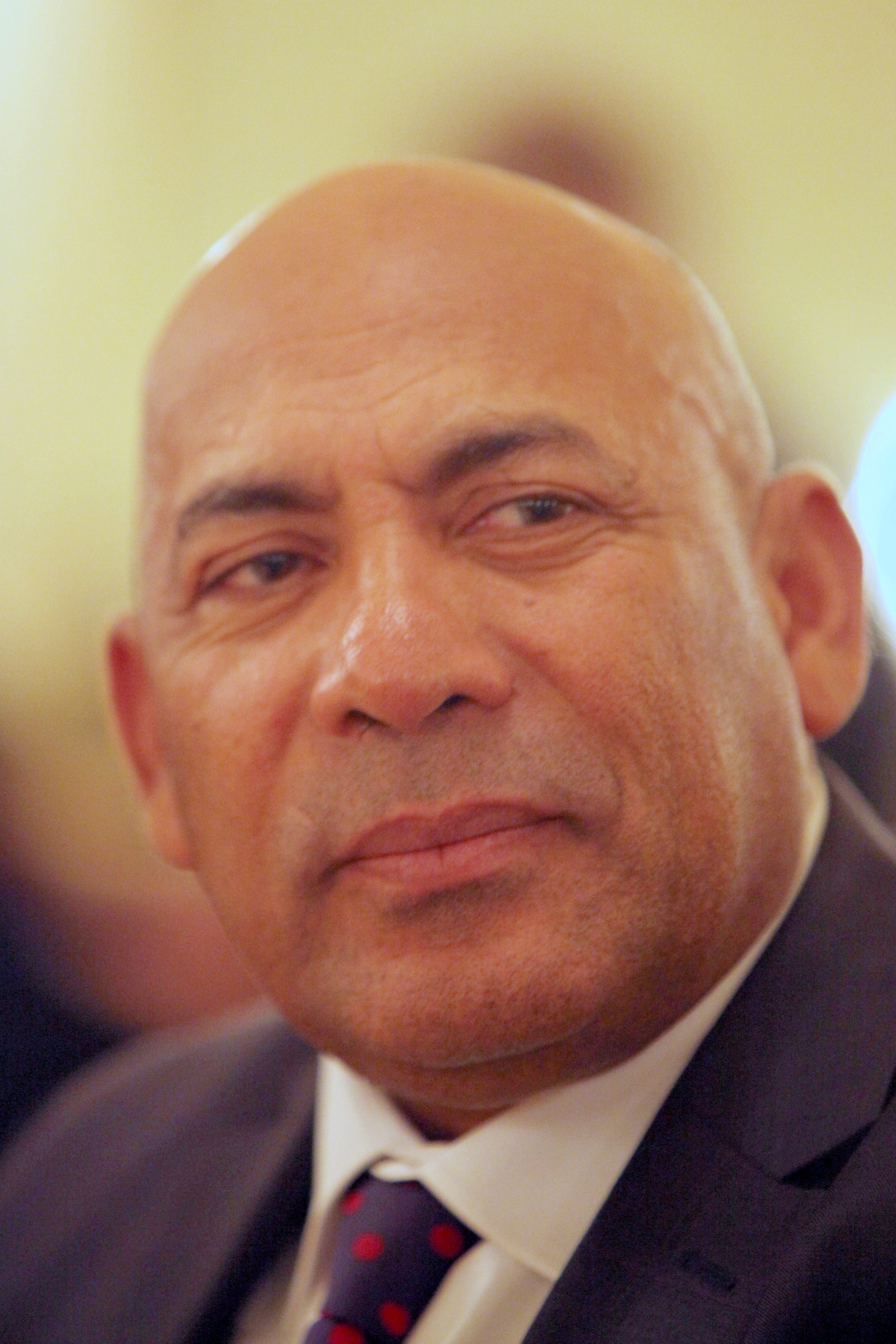

24th Prime Minister of Madagascar
- In office 2 November 2011 – 16 April 2014
- President: Andry Rajoelina; Hery Rajaonarimampianina
- Preceded by: Albert Camille Vital
- Succeeded by: Roger Kolo

Personal details
- Born: 9 September 1950 (age 76) Antsirabe Nord, Madagascar
- Party: Economic Liberalism and Democratic Action for National Recovery

Jean Omer Beriziky (born 9 September 1950 in Vohemar) is a Malagasy politician and diplomat who was Prime Minister of Madagascar in the government of consensus of President Andry Rajoelina from 2011 to 2014.

Beriziky, who hails from the northern part of the island, worked as a history professor. He was posted in Brussels as Madagascar's Ambassador to the European Union and Benelux from 1995 to 2006. A member of the LEADER Fanilo political party, Beriziky was appointed as Prime Minister on 28 October 2011 on the proposal of the party of former President Albert Zafy. He took office on 2 November 2011. He was succeeded by Roger Kolo after newly elected president Hery Rajaonarimampianina appointed Kolo to the post following the 2013 elections.

Political offices
Preceded by Albert Camille Vital	Prime Minister of Madagascar; 2011–2014	Succeeded by Roger Kolo
