= Olivier Mahafaly Solonandrasana =

Malagasy politician

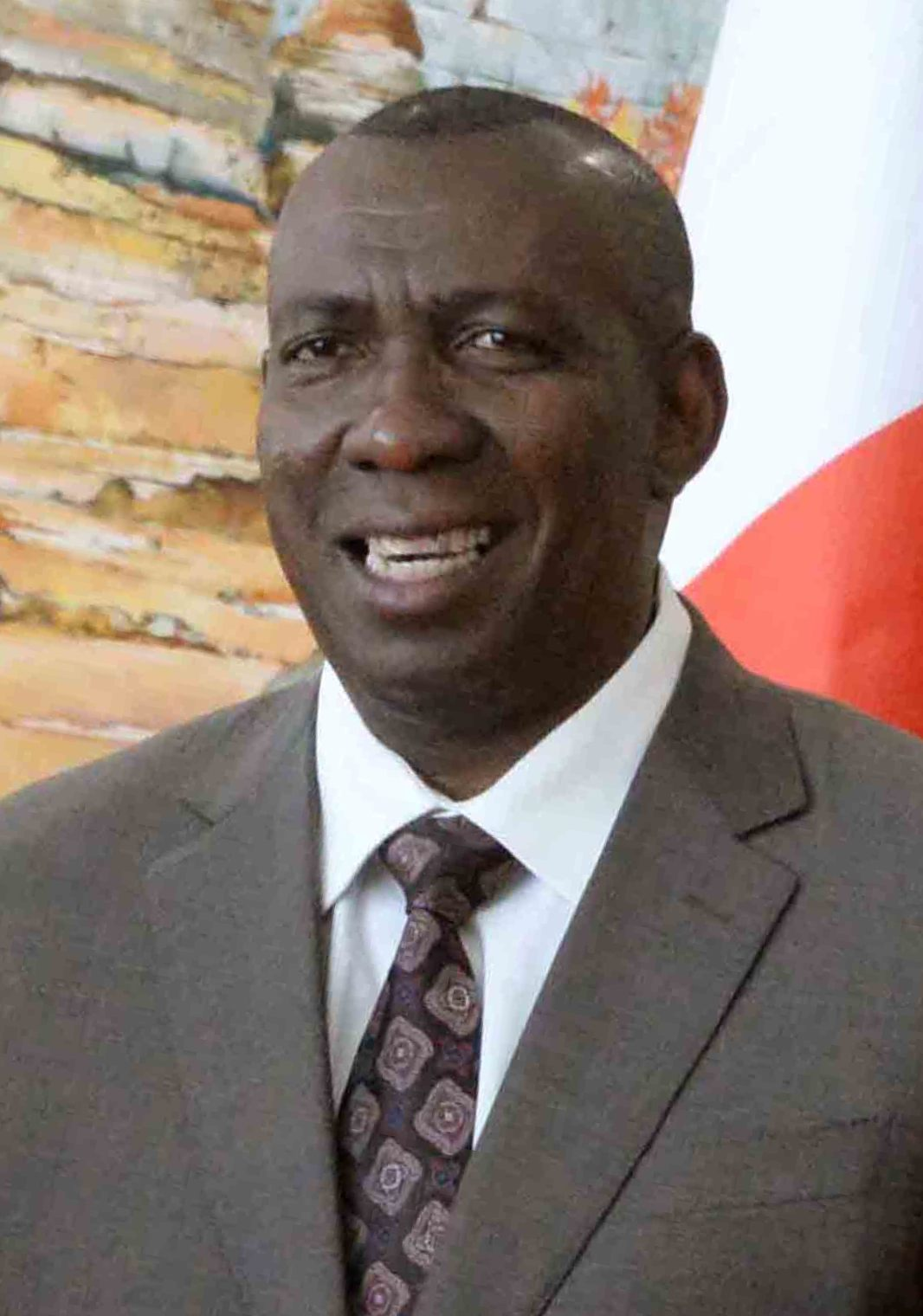

27th Prime Minister of Madagascar
- In office 13 April 2016 – 4 June 2018
- President: Hery Rajaonarimampianina
- Preceded by: Jean Ravelonarivo
- Succeeded by: Christian Ntsay

Personal details
- Born: 21 June 1964 (age 61) Nosy Be, Madagascar
- Party: Independent

Olivier Mahafaly Solonandrasana (born 21 June 1964, Nosy Be, Madagascar) is a Madagascar politician who was Prime Minister of Madagascar from 2016 to 2018. He succeeded Jean Ravelonarivo. Until his appointment as Prime Minister he was Minister of Interior.

On 4 June 2018, he announced his resignation.

He was candidate at the 2018 Malagasy presidential election but he obtained only 0.47% of the votes.

Political offices
Preceded by Jean Ravelonarivo	Prime Minister of Madagascar; 2016–2018	Succeeded by Christian Ntsay
