= Parti des déshérités de Madagascar =

Party of the Disinherited of Madagascar Parti des déshérités de Madagascar
- Founded: June 1946
- Dissolved: 1960
- Succeeded by: Parti Social Démocrate de Madagascar (PSD); Union Démocratique et Sociale de Madagascar (UDSM)
- Ideology: Anticolonialism; Malagasy nationalism Republicanism; Côtier nationalism
- Colors: Green

Party flag

The Parti des déshérités de Madagascar (PADESM, "Party of the Disinherited of Madagascar") was a political party active in French Madagascar from June 1946 until independence from France and the establishment of the First Malagasy Republic in 1960. It was formed largely in opposition to rapid political success of the Mouvement Démocratique de la Rénovation Malgache (MDRM), a predominantly Merina pro-independence nationalist party.

While the MDRM and other nationalist parties enjoyed broad support across various ethnic communities, PADESM focused on empowering and ensuring fair governance for the historically marginalized coastal people which had a long history of conflict with the agrarian and caste-oriented Merina. PADESM strategically campaigned along ethnic lines, initially welcoming both coastal people and descendants of Merina slaves from other ethnic groups. The French colonial administration actively supported PADESM's formation and helped facilitate its political success.

The nationalist Malagasy Uprising of 1947 led the French colonial administration to dissolve the MDRM and temporarily suspend all other political parties in Madagascar, including PADESM in spite of their previous support. During the uprising, political tensions escalated into targeted acts of violence between supporters of the rival groups. It is estimated that pro-MDRM fighters killed between 1,900 and 5,000 PADESM supporters killed during the uprising. However, by December 1948 the uprising had been largely suppressed by colonial authorities, allowing PADESM to resume its political activities while the MDRM would be banned due to its involvement, with most of its leaders either imprisoned or killed in the conflict. As a result, PADESM experienced an increase in popularity, aided by continuing French support.

Although PADESM won several key political elections in the 1950s, the party would grow increasingly fragmented between conservative and progressive factions. Friction between the two groups increased as France increased the political autonomy of its overseas territories, with the progressives and conservatives split over how the country would be run when the day of independence inevitably came. In December 1956, the progressives, led by Philibert Tsiranana, left to form the Parti sociale démocrate (PSD, Social Democratic Party). With this split and independence in 1960, PADESM grew irrelevant and would eventually cease to exist as a political force.

Nevertheless, PADESM has had a lasting impact on political life in Madagascar. Philibert Tsiranana went on to become Madagascar's first president upon independence in 1960. Many other major political figures in Madagascar have connections to the former PADESM, including former president Didier Ratsiraka and former prime minister Jacques Sylla. More importantly, it was the formation of PADESM that cemented ethnic rivalries within Malagasy politics, linking the interests of specific ethnic groups with particular political parties. This has persisted in defining the political development in Madagascar into the present day, as it has for much of Africa in the post-colonial era.

== History ==
=== Founding and ideology ===
Following the conclusion of the Second World War, a constituent assembly convened in Paris in November 1945 to draft the constitution of the French Fourth Republic. In addition to representatives from Metropolitan France, delegations from France's colonial empire were invited to attend. Representing Madagascar were two doctors: Joseph Raseta and Joseph Ravoahangy.

Alongside the Malagasy Négritude writer Jacques Rabemananjara, whom they met in Paris, Raseta and Ravoahangy would found the Mouvement Démocratique de la Rénovation Malgache (MDRM) in Early 1946. All three leaders were the descendants of Hova Merina, the ethnic group that formed the elites of the old Merina Kingdom and had thus lost the most with the beginning of French rule in 1897 . The party's platform was built on national independence from France and garnered mass support that cut across geographic, ethnic and class divisions. In November 1946 the three were elected to represent Madagascar in Paris as deputies (députés) in the French National Assembly, which, with the foundation of the Fourth Republic and the reorganization of France's overseas Empire into the French Union, would now include representatives from the colonies.

However, not all in Madagascar looked forward to a MDRM-led independence movement. Historically marginalized and coastal peoples, such as the Vezo and the Antanosy organized around communal subsistence fisheries, were especially suspicious of the MDRM and its Merina leaders. In pre-colonial Madagascar, the less-developed costal populations were frequently the target of predation by their better-organized and better-armed inland neighbors. Their memory of the old Merina Kingdom was not one characterized by nostalgia, but of rather one of misery, rigid caste hierarchy, and enslavement. In comparison to the Merina-led independence movement, they did not view French rule in such a negative light. They were deeply suspicious of the MDRM, with many fearing that the Merina would use independence to reassert the domination they had once enjoyed.

In reaction to the growing popularity of the MDRM, the Parti des déshérités de Madagascar (PADESM, "Party of the Disinherited of Madagascar") was founded as a party for ethnic groups subjugated by the Merina empire as well as highland-based descendants of former Merina slaves. The militant leader Mahasampo Raveloson was key in the creation of the party. Other founding members included Philibert Tsiranana (who became Madagascar's first president after independence), Albert Sylla (who became Minister of Foreign Affairs under Tsiranana, and whose son, Jacques Sylla, would go on to become Prime Minister of Madagascar under Marc Ravalomanana), Albert Ratsiraka, and Pascale Velonjara, the latter two being father and father-in-law of future president Didier Ratsiraka respectively.

In July 1946, PADESM was changed to become a direct opposition party to MDRM. Initially a non-nationalist party, PADESM eventually favored a gradual process toward independence that would preserve close ties to France and prevent the reemergence of the precolonial Merina hegemony. It actively recruited membership along ethnic lines to include coastal peoples and the descendants of Merina slaves. At the center of the PADESM were intellectual elites and political leaders from coastal areas. The party's platform focused on increasing resource distribution and investment to coastal areas to counterbalance decades of colonial investment in the wealthier central highlands. Over time, the party grew more conservative and ethnic-oriented, with Mahasampo Raveloson leading a successful effort to exclude any Merina from the party, even descendants of those who had been enslaved by nobles of their own ethnic group under the Merina Kingdom and shared their coastal compatriots' concerns regarding Merina political dominance.

The Socialist-dominated French authorities actively supported PADESM. The French embraced PADESM's ethnic discourse, characterizing their support as an effort to champion the oppressed masses and protect them against exploitative Hova-Merina elites. Governor General Jules Marcel de Coppet provided the party with space in public buildings for meetings. In the January 1947 provincial elections, PADESM received financial support from French settlers due to the party's favorable disposition to the colonial administration.

In the critical November 1946 election to select the first ever deputies to represent Madagascar at the French National Assembly, MDRM accused the French administration of stuffing ballot boxes, tampering with electoral rolls, intimidating MDRM candidates, supporters, and blatantly falsifying election results to ensure PADESM victory. Despite these irregularities, MDRM won 71% of the vote and none of the PADESM candidates were elected. While MDRM won decisive victories in the central and eastern province, results were close in the western province, where the MDRM candidate Joseph Raseta won 21,475 votes and the PADESM candidate Totelehibe won 19,014 votes.

=== Role during and after the Malagasy Uprising ===
In early 1947 the French administration instituted a new rule that increased the weight of the French vote over the Malagasy vote in the selection of candidates. As a result, three PADESM candidates favored by French conservatives were elected to the Conseil de la République. The results of the election and popular discontent with French interference intensified widespread Malagasy frustration against colonial authorities and a desire for Malagasy self-governance. These factors finally erupted in a nationalist uprising that began on the evening of 29 March 1947 with attacks against a police camp and several French plantations in the eastern rainforest. These were carried out by militant Malagasy nationalists, chief among them the members of the nationalist secret societies Vy Vato Sakelika (VVS) and Jiny.

Despite the role of the militants - not the legal independence movement - in leading the Uprising, the colonial authorities immediately accused the MDRM of instigating the conflict. This view was echoed by PADESM leaders and shared by the majority of French settlers. The French authorities responded by targeting not only MDRM leaders and members, but also their supporters, drawing the wider population into the conflict. Attacks against the colonial authority in the east were immediately followed by similar actions in the south of the island before rapidly spreading throughout the country. The movement enjoyed particularly strong support in the south, where as many as one million peasants joined the revolt. The French responded with severe military forrce and psychological warfare, some of which have been classified as crimes against humanity. Between July and September 1948, most of the key leaders of the Uprising were captured or killed and the last of the fighters disbanded and fled into the forests in December 1948.

The eruption of the conflict provided the pretext for the outbreak of ethnic violence between highland Merina and coastal Malagasy of other ethnic groups. An estimated 1,900 to 5,000 Malagasy PADESM supporters were killed by pro-MDRM nationalists during the conflict.

Although the MDRM leadership consistently maintained its innocence, the French administration banned the party on 10 May 1947, and all other political parties were temporarily suspended including PADESM. The banning of MDRM further strengthened PADESM's prominence after the end of the uprising. Between 1951 and 1956, PADESM candidates won three consecutive legislative elections.

=== Decline ===
Despite the outward appearance of success, the party was suffering from internal divisions. Other countries under French colonial rule, including Morocco, Indochina and several in West Africa, had either become independent or had begun to negotiate the process to independence; this inspired the hope that Madagascar could follow suit, allowing for the tantalizing opportunity for PADESM to wield unfettered power in Malagasy politics. This emerging possibility fragmented the party, which became paralyzed by in-fighting. Led by Philibert Tsiranana, a French-educated school teacher of Tsimihety coastal origin, and Andre Raseta, the progressive faction split off to form the Parti sociale démocrate (PSD, Social Democratic Party) in Mahajanga in December 1956.

== Legacy ==
The PSD that emerged from the disintegration of PADESM was a powerful force in Malagasy politics throughout the First Republic. When Madagascar achieved independence in 1960, PSD leader Tsiranana was named the country's first president, a position he held until the rotaka protests forced him to resign in 1972. His administration was succeeded by the socialist nationalist Second Republic under Didier Ratsiraka.

== Bibliography ==
- Galibert, Didier (2009). Les gens du pouvoir à Madagascar: État postcolonial, légitimités et territoire, 1956–2002 (in French). Paris: Karthala Editions. ISBN 978-2-8111-0213-5.
- Mazrui, Ali AlʼAmin; Wondji, Christophe (1993). Generale History of Africa – Vol. VIII – Africa since 1935. Paris: UNESCO. ISBN 978-92-3-102758-1.
- Quemeneur, Tramor (2004). 100 fiches d'histoire du XXe siècle (in French). Paris: Editions Bréal. ISBN 978-2-7495-0341-7.
- Raison-Jourde, Françoise; Randrianja, Solofo (2002). La nation malgache au défi de l'ethnicité (in French). Paris: Karthala Editions. ISBN 978-2-84586-304-0.
- Shillington, Kevin (2004). Encyclopedia of African History. New York, NY: Routledge. ISBN 978-1-135-45670-2.
- Thomas, Martin (2014). Fight Or Flight: Britain, France, and Their Roads from Empire. London: Oxford University Press. ISBN 978-0-19-969827-1.
- Thompson, Virginia; Adloff, Richard (1965). The Malagasy Republic: Madagascar Today. Stanford CA: Stanford University Press. ISBN 978-0-8047-0279-9.
