= Malagasy Uprising =

1947–1949 anti-French revolt in Madagascar

- Part of the decolonisation of Africa
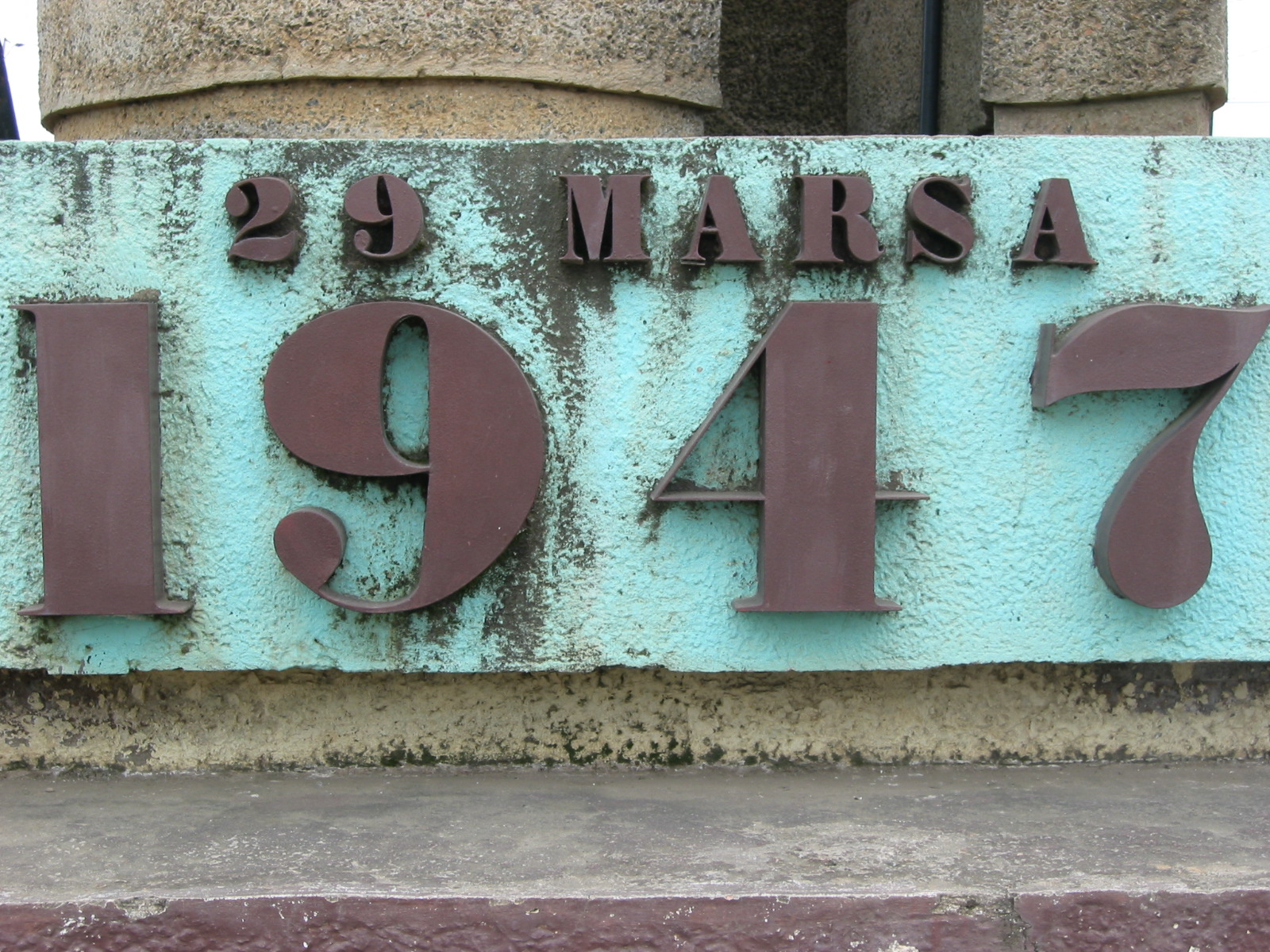
- The Malagasy Uprising against French colonial rule, which began on 29 March 1947, is commemorated by a national monument in Moramanga.
Date	29 March 1947 – February 1949
Location	Madagascar
Result	Uprising crushed by French forces, various Malagasy participants tried and executed.

Belligerents
France: French Union; PADESM (limited involvement)	Malagasy secret societies: Jiny; Panama; Local militias MDRM (limited involvement); Supported by: United Kingdom (disputed; French intelligence claims)

Commanders and leaders
Jules Marcel de Coppet (High Commissioner until Dec. 1947); Pierre Gabriel de Chevigné (High Commissioner from Feb. 1948)	Victorien Razafindrabe (DOW); Michel Radaoroson †; Lehoaha (surrendered); Ralaivao (POW); Monja Jaona (POW); Samuel Rakotondrabe

Strength
18,000 (1947); 30,000 (1948)	Initially 2,000, later hundreds of thousands

Casualties and losses
590 French soldiers killed	Unknown
- 11,342 to 89,000 (average estimate of 30,000 to 40,000) Malagasy civilians and combatants killed; 240 French civilians killed

The Malagasy Uprising (French: Insurrection malgache; Malagasy: Tolom-bahoaka tamin' ny 1947) was a Malagasy nationalist rebellion against French colonial rule in Madagascar, lasting from March 1947 to February 1949. Starting in late 1945, Madagascar's first French National Assembly deputies, Joseph Raseta, Joseph Ravoahangy, and Jacques Rabemananjara of the Mouvement démocratique de la rénovation malgache (MDRM) political party, led an effort to achieve independence for Madagascar through legal channels. The failure of this initiative and the harsh response it drew from the Socialist Ramadier administration radicalized elements of the Malagasy population, including leaders of several militant nationalist secret societies.

On the evening of 29 March 1947, coordinated surprise attacks were launched by Malagasy nationalists, armed mainly with spears, against military bases and French-owned plantations in the eastern part of the island concentrated around Moramanga and Manakara. The nationalist cause was rapidly adopted in the south and spread to the central highlands and the capital of Antananarivo by the following month, with the number of Malagasy nationalist fighters estimated at over one million.

By May 1947, the French began to counter the nationalists. The French tripled the number of troops on the island to 18,000, primarily by transferring soldiers from French colonies elsewhere in Africa. The colonial authorities sought to fight on the physical and psychological fronts and engaged in a variety of terror tactics designed to demoralize the population. The French military force carried out mass execution, torture, war rape, torching of entire villages, collective punishment, and other atrocities such as throwing live Malagasy prisoners out of airplanes (death flights).

The estimated number of Malagasy casualties varies from a low of 11,000 to a high of over 100,000. The nationalists killed approximately 550 French nationals, as well as 1,900 Malagasy auxiliary men of the French army. By August 1948, the majority of the nationalist leaders were killed or captured, and the Uprising was effectively put down by December 1948, though the last armed resistance was only defeated in February 1949.

The violent repression of the nationalist insurgency left deep scars in Malagasy society. A generation of the managerial class was wiped out, creating challenges for the country when it achieved independence in 1960. Madagascar's first three deputies were arrested, tortured and kept in prison until they were given amnesty in 1958. Another leader who survived the conflict, Monja Jaona, was also jailed for nine years and then founded the Madagascar for the Malagasy Party (MONIMA), which has had considerable influence on Malagasy politics. France classified most documents related to the Uprising, and the French government maintained silence on the subject until French president Jacques Chirac termed it "unacceptable" during an official visit to Madagascar in 2005. Several Malagasy directors have set films in the period of the Uprising. In 1967, the Malagasy government declared 29 March an annual holiday, and in 2012, a museum dedicated to the Uprising was inaugurated in Moramanga.

== Background ==
A map showing Madagascar (highlighted) within modern-day Africa.

By the close of the 19th century, Madagascar was largely under the control of the Kingdom of Imerina, with its royal palaces at its capital in Antananarivo. Although the kingdom had existed since the early 16th century, it expanded its control beyond its traditional borders in the 1820s under King Radama I, who the British government officially recognized as the sovereign over the entire island of Madagascar. After several failed attempts to impose its authority over the island, France used military force to capture the royal palace in September 1894 and exiled Prime Minister Rainilaiarivony upon officially colonizing the island in February 1895. Queen Ranavalona III was allowed to remain as a figurehead until the emergence of a popular uprising, termed the Menalamba rebellion, for which the queen was held responsible. The rebellion was harshly crushed, and the queen was exiled in 1897.

The Menalamba rebellion was only the first manifestation of ongoing opposition to French rule that occasionally erupted in violent clashes between the Malagasy and the colonial authorities in Madagascar. Secret nationalist societies began to form in the 1910s. Conscription of Malagasy soldiers to fight for France in World War I strengthened resentment of foreign rule, and in the interwar period these nationalist organizations proliferated. Germany's defeat of the French Army and occupation of France in 1940, the imposition of a Vichy regime in Madagascar and the subsequent capture of the island by the British in 1942 further tarnished the colonial government's image. Popular anger was especially aroused by its policies of forced labor in lieu of taxes, involuntary conscription into the army to fight in World War II, and the required contribution of large quantities of rice per head annually.

Malagasy hopes for greater sovereignty were stirred by remarks given by General Charles de Gaulle at the Brazzaville Conference in 1944, where de Gaulle announced all colonies were thereafter French overseas territories entitled to representation in the French National Assembly, and promised citizenship rights to residents of its overseas colonies. Despite the partial implementation of these reforms, forced labor on French-owned plantations and other rights abuses in Madagascar continued unabated. The nationalist secret society Panama (Patriotes nationalistes malgaches) was founded in 1941, followed in 1943 by another called Jiny after a type of local red bird. Both organizations, which sought to achieve independence by force if necessary, saw their membership swell during this period.

Following the end of the Second World War, several key Malagasy nationalist leaders attempted to achieve independence for Madagascar through legal means. At the first post-war constituent assembly convened in Paris in November 1945 to draft the constitution of the French Fourth Republic, Madagascar was represented by two doctors named Joseph Raseta and Joseph Ravoahangy. Together with future writer Jacques Rabemananjara, in early 1946 they formed the Mouvement démocratique de la rénovation malgache (MDRM) political party, whose platform was built on national independence from France.

All three leaders were the descendants of Hova who had been politically prominent in the former Merina royal court. The movement was pacifist, and while it sought independence for Madagascar, it embraced the French vision of the island as part of the global Francophone economic and cultural community. Their platform garnered mass support that cut across geographic, ethnic and class divisions, and in November 1946 the trio were elected to represent Madagascar as deputies (députés) in the French National Assembly. The Malagasy deputies submitted a bill to grant independence for Madagascar from French rule, but French deputies rejected it.

The deputies attracted the disapproval of France's Socialist Prime Minister, Paul Ramadier, and the Minister of the Colonies, Marius Moutet. The French had humiliatingly had to ask Britain to yield Madagascar after World War II ended, and French political leaders suspected that Britain or South Africa would attempt to wrest Madagascar from France. The MDRM quest for independence was therefore received as a blow to French prestige and authority, and it raised the specter of the violent conflict launched by Vietnamese nationalists in French Indochina the month before.

Moutet responded stridently, declaring a "war against the Malagasy autonomy movement". The refusal of the French government to support a democratic process toward independence for Madagascar drew criticism from the United States government, which strongly denounced the French reaction and criticized its leadership. It also radicalized the leadership of the militant nationalist groups in Madagascar. Sensing the worsening mood in the country, on 27 March 1947 deputies Raseta, Ravoahangy and Rabemananjara jointly issued a statement, urging the public to "maintain absolute calm and coolness in the face of manoeuvrings and provocations of all kind destined to stir up troubles among the Malagasy population and to sabotage the peaceful policy of the MDRM."

== Independence movement ==
=== Nationalist insurgency ===
A nationalist fighter from the rural southeast. The rebels were poorly armed, as only a few had rifles. Most faced the modern French military with spears.

The Malagasy Uprising began on the evening of 29 March 1947, the evening before Palm Sunday. The timing had additional significance as the historic date of the traditional Merina Kingdom fandroana new year's festival, historically celebrated by a ritual period of anarchy followed by the Merina sovereign's reestablishment of order. Malagasy nationalists, chief among them the members of the nationalist secret societies Panama and Jiny, coordinated surprise attacks in the eastern part of the island at the Tristani police camp near the rail line at Moramanga, in the coastal town of Manakara and at several points along the lower Faraony River where key French plantations were located. Furthermore, a unit of the Tirailleurs Malgaches (Malagasy colonial troops) mutinied at Diego-Suarez and defected to the rebels.

Most historians share the view that the militants escalated the conflict toward violence on the basis of false information transmitted by duplicitous individuals or groups attempting to neutralize the nationalist influence. Members of VVS and Jiny involved in the initial attacks have stated that their organizations were obliged to attack after the signal to take action was transmitted to them by a group that was later discovered to have secret ties to the national police. Researchers have documented reports of nationalists whose member organizations joined the conflict upon commands issued by the colonial police and French settlers living in Madagascar. Despite the role of the militants in leading the uprising, the colonial authorities immediately held MDRM responsible for the movement and responded by targeting the party's members and supporters. The extent to which the MDRM was actually involved in the uprising is disputed; most leaders of the party later claimed that they were innocent, whereas French intelligence maintained that the party had forged links with foreign powers like United Kingdom to channel arms and ammunition to militants. Later appraisals suggest that the MDRM was infiltrated by members of militant secret societies before the rebellion, and that though members of the party aided the insurgency, the party as whole did not.

The French generally suspected that the rebellion was secretly supported by foreign powers, most significantly by the United Kingdom. Two British nationals, namely ex-Major John Morris, and Major Nicholson who worked at the British consulate in Antananarivo, were accused of stirring up Malagasy nationalist activities. Morris was eventually expelled from the island as a result. There also circulated rumours about American support for the rebels, though no evidence emerged to support these claims. In fact, the rebels were almost completely isolated from outside aid, and extremely poorly supplied with modern weaponry. They likely never possessed more than 150 rifles and three machine guns. Most rebels had to resort to spears, and had minimal protection from the firearms of the French military. Nevertheless, the rebels invented encirclement, ambush and human wave tactics that allowed them to defeat their better armed opponents on several occasions.

The attacks in the east were immediately followed by similar actions in the south of the island before rapidly spreading throughout the country. By early April, when violence first erupted in Antananarivo, the number of nationalist fighters was estimated at around 2,000. Attacks against French military bases multiplied over the course of the month throughout the central highlands as far south as Fianarantsoa and as far north as Lake Alaotra. The movement enjoyed particularly strong support in the south, where the revolt attracted as many as one million peasants to fight for the nationalist cause.

Two guerrilla zones were established in the eastern rainforest and the fighters extended their control from these points. The nationalists grouped together under various established or new configurations, including several militias with their own leadership structure, including generals and war ministers. Militias were sometimes led by traditional leaders (mpanjaka) of local communities. Many of the insurgents were demobilized soldiers of the Tirailleurs Malgaches returning from World War II and frustrated with the limited recognition and opportunity afforded them by the French colonial government. Numerous others were railway workers who hid themselves in the dense eastern rainforest and made use of guerrilla tactics to attack French interests along the rail line connecting Antananarivo to the eastern port town of Toamasina. At the height of the movement, nationalist insurgents gained control of one third of the island. The rebel territory was home to about 1,600,000 people, and a provisional government was set up: The head of the northern zone was Victorien Razafindrabe, a Merina and low-ranking ex-official, whereas Betsileo ex-teacher Michel Radaoroson served as insurgent leader in the south. The rebel provisional government followed a policy of total war, and instructed all civilians under its control to assist the war effort by producing weapons, uniforms, and food for the rebels, to build air shelters to protect insurgents from air strikes and air reconnaissance, and to gather intelligence for the rebellion.

The eruption of the conflict provided the pretext for violence between highland Merina and coastal Malagasy of other ethnic groups that were linked to precolonial history and politics. Merina Hova elites founded the MDRM not only in the interest of ending French rule, but also in regaining the political dominance of the Merina upon independence. In reaction to the founding of the MDRM, in 1946 the Party for the Disinherited of Madagascar (Parti des déshérités de Madagascar, PADESM) was formed. It attracted membership from members of coastal communities formerly subjugated by the Merina empire, as well as highland-based descendants of former Merina slaves. Initially a non-nationalist party, PADESM eventually favored a gradual process toward independence that would preserve close ties to France and prevent the reemergence of the precolonial Merina hegemony. The French authorities tacitly supported PADESM, which accused MDRM of launching the uprising to re-establish Merina rule. By aligning itself with PADESM, Socialist-dominated French politicians sought to cast themselves as champions of the oppressed masses against the exploitative Hova elites. Though the uprising indeed remained geographically limited, it enjoyed broad support among several ethnic groups, not just Merina.

=== French response ===
French security forces were initially taken by surprise and were unable to organize an effective response to contain the uprising. By May 1947, however, the French military had begun to counter the nationalists' attacks. Five North African infantry battalions from Algeria and Morocco arrived in Madagascar at the end of July 1947, enabling the French to take the initiative. However, French army strength remained modest with soldiers numbering 18,000 in April 1947. The number of troops increased to about 30,000 in 1948. The French forces now included paratroopers, soldiers of the French Foreign Legion, and tirailleurs (colonial infantry) brought in from the French territories of Comoros and Senegal.

The French strategy followed the "oil spot" method of General Joseph Gallieni, the first governor of the island (1896–1905) to root out, demoralize and crush the guerrilla fighters. In addition, the security forces adopted a strategy of terror and psychological warfare involving torture, collective punishment, the burning of villages, mass arrests and executions, and war rape. Many of these practices were later employed by the French military during the Algerian War. The intensity and cruelty of the French response was until then unprecedented in the colonial history of France. On 6 May 1947, in Moramanga, soldiers machine-gunned MDRM officials detained in wagons, killing between 124 and 160 mostly unarmed MDRM activists. In Mananjary, hundreds of Malagasy were killed, among them 18 women and a group of prisoners thrown alive out of an airplane. Other massacres of 35 to 50 people occurred in Farafangana, Manakara, and Mahanoro.

The rebels had expected that the United States might intervene in their favor, but no such action was taken by Washington. In addition, the majority of the population did not rise up to join them in their fight. The rebels were thus steadily pushed back by the superior French military. Razafindrabe was forced to give up his headquarters at Beparasy in August 1947, while Radaoroson was usurped as leader of the southern insurgents by another rebel leader, Lehoaha, whose forces were better armed than those of Radaoroson. The rebels further fragmented in the next months. The French counter-attacks remained rather limited until April 1948, however, as their forces were hindered by disease, the weather, and the unfamiliarity of the imported troops with local conditions, with over a thousand men hospitalized. With the end of the wet season, however, the French launched a large-scale offensive and overran the rebel territories. Between July and September 1948, most of the key leaders of the Uprising were captured or killed. Radaoroson died in combat on 20 July, Razafindrabe was captured on 2 September and died shortly afterwards, while Lehoaha surrendered on 11 November. The last rebel stronghold, named Tsiazombazaha ("That which is inaccessible to Europeans"), fell in November 1948. Defeated, most of the remaining nationalist fighters disappeared into the eastern rainforest in December 1948. The last senior rebel leader, Ralaivao, was captured in February 1949, effectively ending the armed resistance.

=== Casualties ===
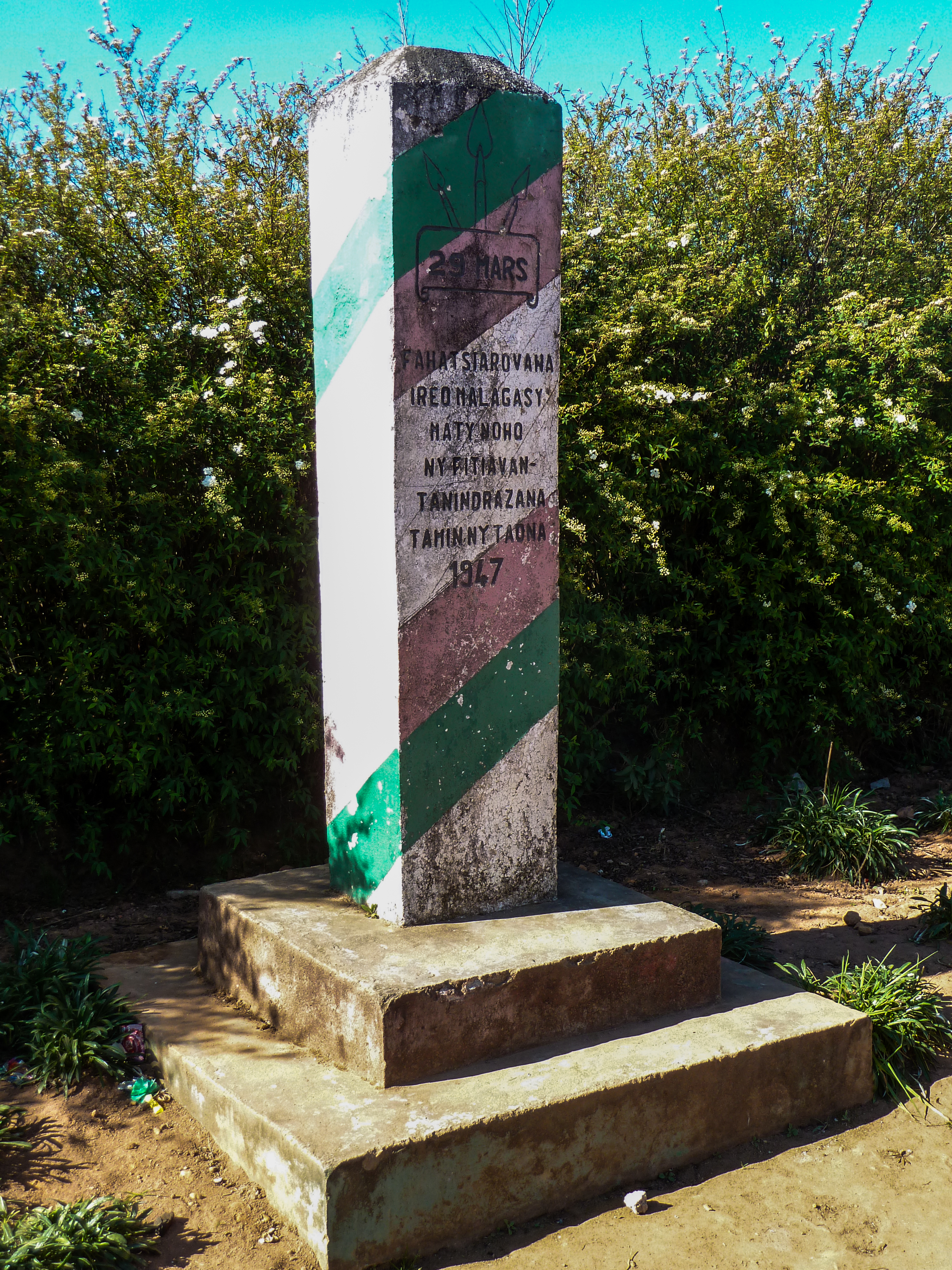
Monument for the Malagasy Uprising in the village of Antoetra. The memorial reads: "In memory of the Malagasy who died in 1947 for the love of their homeland."

The French government's first official estimate of the number of Malagasy killed in the conflict was 89,000. In 1949 the High Commissioner of Madagascar added to this figure the estimated number who fled into the forest and were believed dead, declaring the true number of dead at over 100,000. Many Malagasy believe this to be an underestimate of the actual number killed. The population of Madagascar at the time of the Uprising was approximately four million, and these estimated losses represented nearly two percent of the population. In 1950, the colonial administration revised the casualty number to 11,342 "known dead". According to official French figures 4,928 of these had been killed in rioting while the remainder had died of starvation or exhaustion after fleeing the fighting.

Historians continue to disagree over the number of casualties during the Malagasy Uprising. The original figure of 89,000 casualties is often quoted. Historian Jean Fremigacci contested the 89,000 estimate, noting that losses of this magnitude normally should have manifested on the demographic curve, but in Madagascar population growth began again and even accelerated from 1946 to 1949. He estimates 30–40,000 Malagasy deaths, of which 30,000 were violent and the remainder attributable to disease and starvation in the conflict areas. Fremigacci's interpretation was challenged by demographer Alfred Sauvy, who suggested the trauma to population growth that would normally be observed by these casualties may have been masked by improvements in malaria survival rates resulting from a major colonial anti-malaria campaign undertaken in the same period. According to Fremigacci, "There were war crimes in Madagascar in 1947 but without intent to exterminate."

An estimated 550 French nationals died during the conflict, of whom 350 were soldiers. In addition 1,900 Malagasy auxiliary men of the French army were killed.

== Aftermath ==
Although the MDRM leadership consistently maintained its innocence, the party was outlawed by the French colonial rulers. The French government classified the Malagasy Uprising documentation of the military, the Ministry of Foreign Affairs and the Ministry of the Colonies.

The French media reported little on the event as it happened, and relatively little mention of the nationalist struggle was mentioned in Les Temps Modernes, the leftist publication that would become considered the leading anti-colonial advocate after the launch of the French offensive in Indochina. Other private publications served as forums for the Francophone intelligentsia to express their condemnation of the French government's response to the Uprising. The most commentary appeared in the left-leaning Catholic monthly L'Esprit, with criticisms also published in such other leftist publications as Humanité, Combat, Franc-tireur and Témoignage Chrétien. Albert Camus penned a seething rebuke of the French colonial administration that was published on 10 May 1947 in Combat. Very few details of the rising and subsequent repression were reported at the time outside France.

Over the decades that followed independence the French government and news sources in France remained largely silent on the issue of the Malagasy Uprising. In 1997, a Malagasy official criticized the French for never having had a diplomat present at the annual commemoration ceremonies. The first official condemnation of the Uprising's suppression by the French colonial authorities was expressed by president Jacques Chirac during his official visit to Madagascar on 21 July 2005, when he met with Malagasy president Marc Ravalomanana and qualified the repression of the Malagasy uprising as "unacceptable". On the 65th anniversary of the Uprising in 2012, Malagasy Prime Minister Omer Beriziky issued a request to the French government to declassify their archival materials related to the Uprising, but the request was not approved. In April 2025, France announced the creation of a joint commission of historians on the "atrocities" of decolonization. This commission will be tasked with investigating the violent repression of the 1947 uprising by the French army.

=== Trials and executions ===
Trial of former deputies Joseph Ravoahangy, Joseph Raseta, and Jacques Rabemananjara (far left to right)

From July to October 1948 in Antananarivo, the French organized a large public trial of the uprising, charging 77 officials of the MDRM. The French authorities claimed that MDRM appeals for calm immediately prior to the outbreak of violence had been a diversion tactic to mask their involvement in organizing the rebellion, which the French alleged was secretly launched by way of an encoded MDRM telegram. Deputies Ravoahangy and Rabemananjara were arrested and imprisoned on 12 April 1947, followed two months later by Raseta (who was in Paris when the Uprising began), in violation of their right to diplomatic immunity. Debates about the Malagasy Uprising in the French National Assembly on 1 August 1947 concluded with the decision to revoke this immunity for all three deputies, who were tortured in prison.

The trial, which was held from 22 July to 4 October 1948, was marked by numerous irregularities. The principal witness for the prosecution was shot dead three days before the trial, and much of the evidence against the defendants was obtained through torture. All three were found guilty of conspiracy against the state and endangering national security. Although these points were raised at the trial, Ravoahangy was sentenced to death, along with Raseta and four other nationalists, while Rabemananjara was sentenced to life in prison. In July 1949, the convicts' death sentences were commuted to life in prison, and the trio remained imprisoned until they were granted amnesty in 1958. Few individuals, with the notable exception of Monja Jaona, the founder of Jiny in the south, have claimed responsibility for a leadership role in the insurrection.

Beside this "trial of the parliamentarians", military courts relayed by civilian courts condemned 5,765 Malagasy nationals (865 by military courts and 4,891 by civilians). The military courts delivered 44 death penalties but carried out only eight executions, while 16 of the 129 death penalties pronounced by the civilian courts were enacted. Through amnesties and remissions, all prisoners (except the leaders) were freed in 1957.

=== National trauma ===
The uprising and its repression caused trauma that continues to manifest in the Malagasy population. Many Malagasy nationals fought each other and struggle to reconcile themselves to the remorse and guilt. Healing at the national level is further complicated by the fact that the same leaders who proclaimed Madagascar's independence in 1960 were those who had been major players in the PADESM political party, which had been favored by the colonial administration after the crushing of the revolt.

According to historian Philippe Leymarie, the French crushing of the Uprising resulted in the near annihilation of the managerial class in Madagascar, with consequences that continued to reverberate for decades after the country's independence. Many of the leading figures in the Uprising went on to dramatically shape the political and social landscape of Madagascar after independence. Monja Jaona, who was jailed by the French for nine years, founded the Madagascar for the Malagasy Party (MONIMA) in 1958 shortly after his release. His party was key in leading the rotaka peasant uprising against President Philibert Tsiranana which brought down his neo-colonial administration the following year. After initially supporting Admiral Didier Ratsiraka, Tsiranana's successor, in 1992 Jaona led demonstrations against it and in favor of federalism, being severely wounded in the process. His son, Monja Roindefo, is also an active member of MONIMA and served as Prime Minister under Andry Rajoelina.

== Commemoration ==
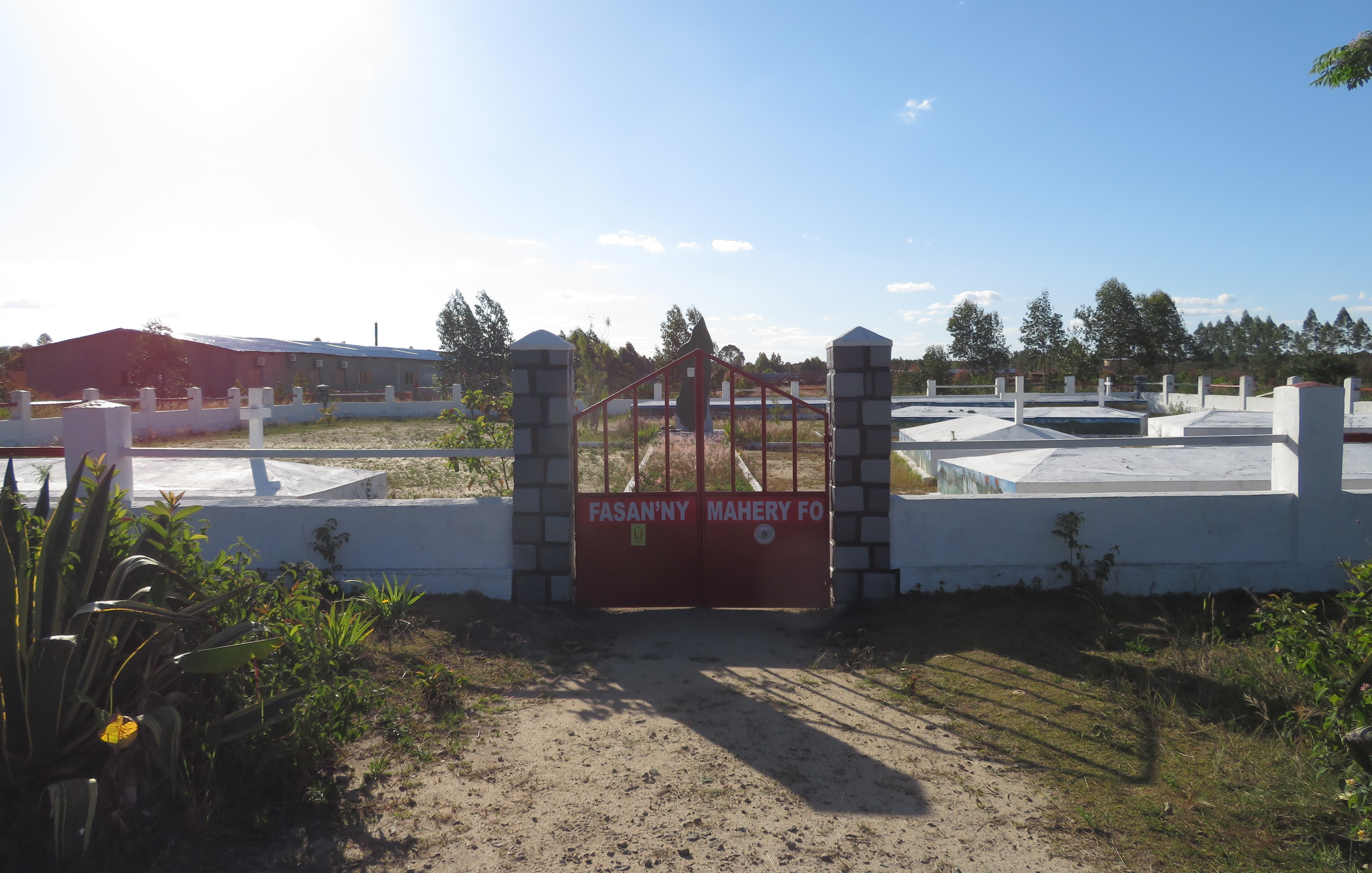
Memorial in Moramanga

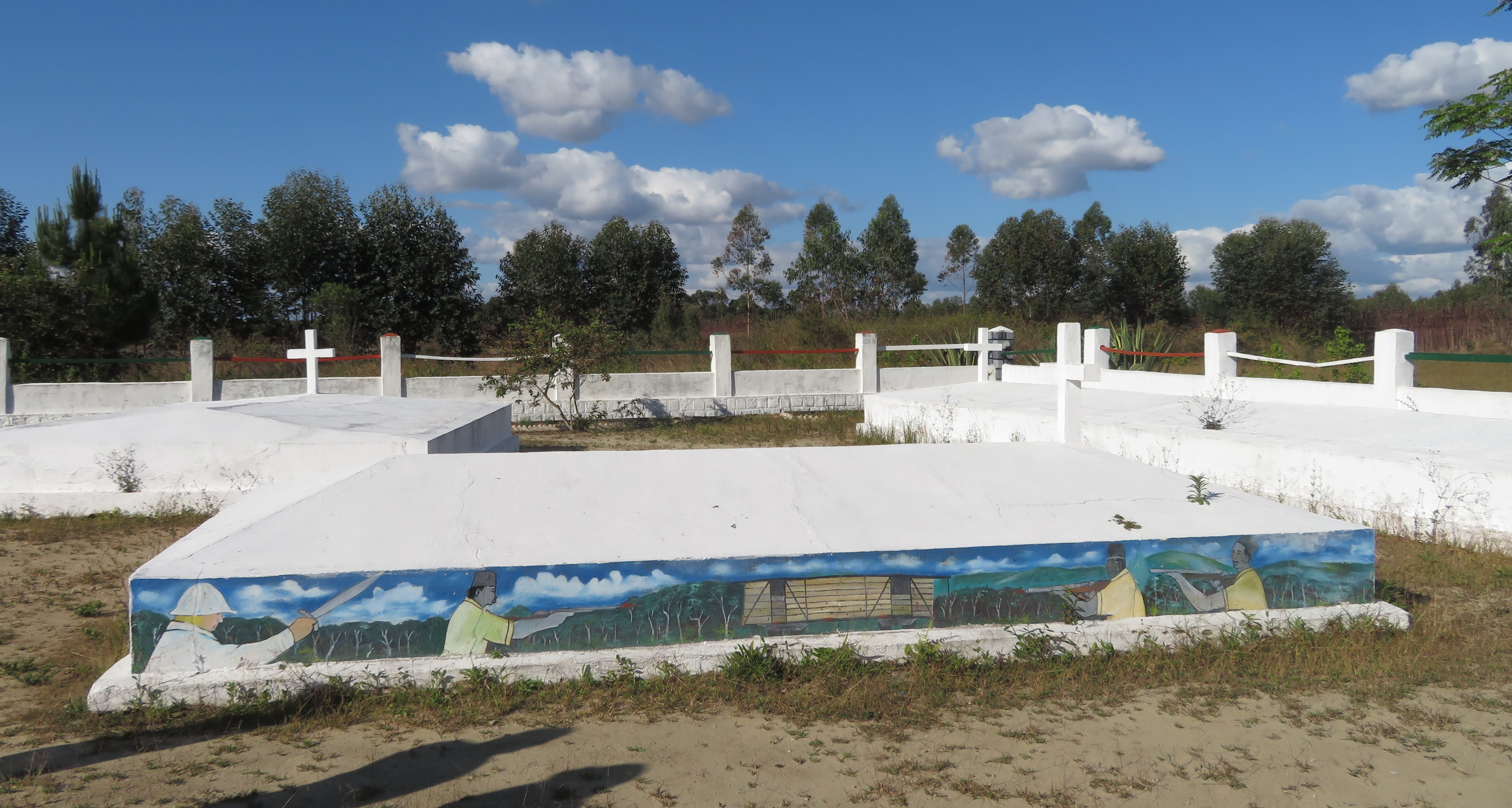
Cemetery of the victims in Moramanga

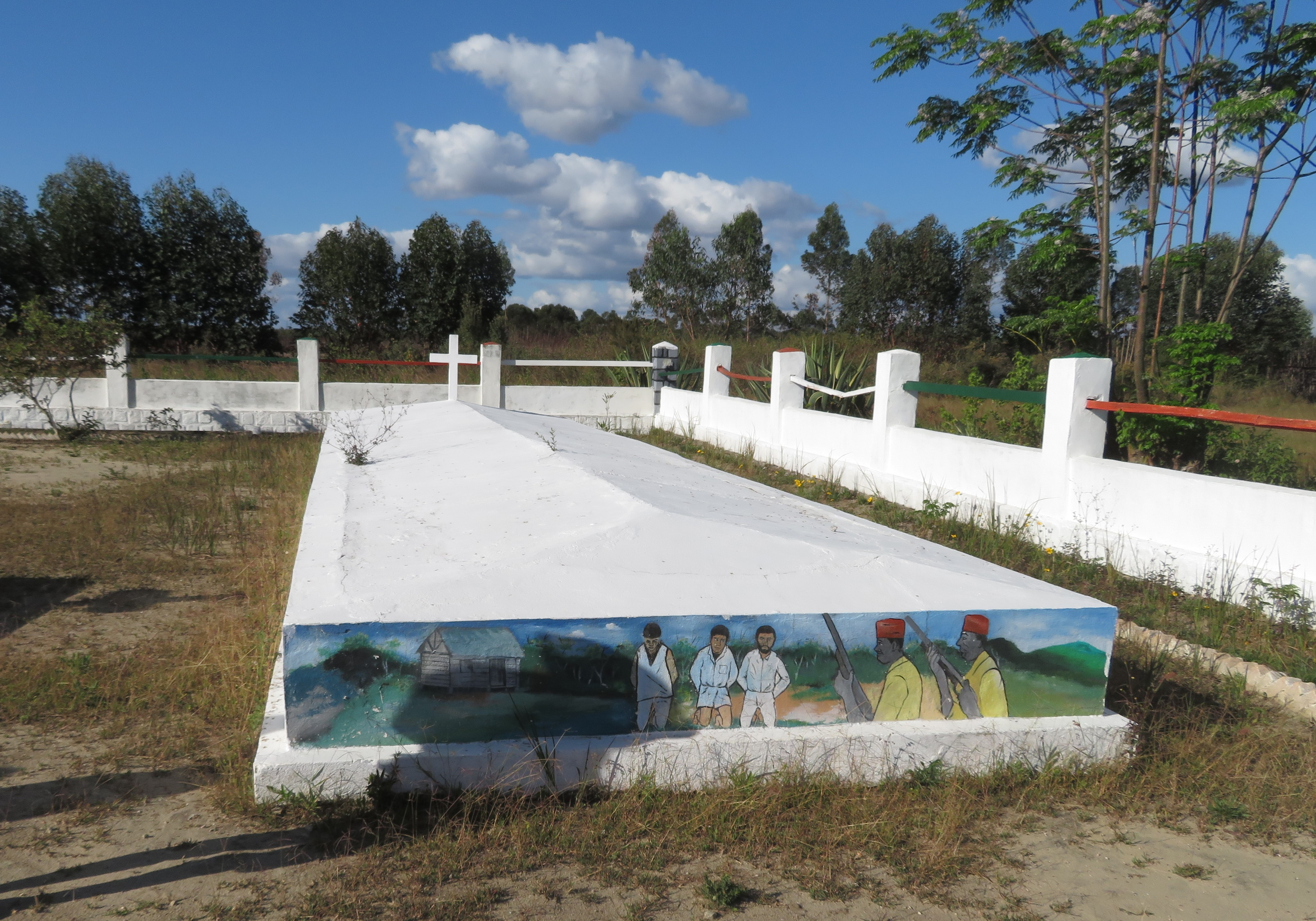
Cemetery of the victims in Moramanga

The Malagasy government has organized official annual commemorations of the Uprising since 1967, when 29 March was first declared a day of mourning by President Tsiranana. It is now observed as Martyrs' Day. The annual commemorations under his administration brought together perpetrators of war crimes, their surviving victims, former nationalist guerrillas and leaders, and family members of those killed, and characterized the Uprising as a tragic mistake. In the late 1970s under the Ratsiraka administration, the commemorations took on a new tone of pride and gratitude to nationalist fighters who sacrificed for their ideals and paved the way for later nationalist leaders.

A national museum dedicated to the Uprising was inaugurated in 2012 by President Andry Rajoelina at Moramanga, 100 kilometers east of Antananarivo. The town has long been the site of the national monument to the conflict, as well as a mausoleum at the town entrance near Ampanihifana containing the remains of an estimated 2,500 local nationalists killed in the conflict.

The Malagasy Uprising has been commemorated in print and cinema. The film Tabataba (1989), directed by Raymond Rajaonarivelo, relates the experience of the insurrection through the eyes of an adolescent boy named Solo. It won awards at the Cannes Film Festival and the Carthage Film Festival. The term tabataba means "noise" or "troubles" in the Malagasy language, and remains a common euphemism to refer to the Uprising. The film Ilo Tsy Very by director Solo Randrasana also depicts the Uprising, and was remade in 2011 to include references to the 2009 Malagasy political crisis. In 1994, French directors Danièle Rousselier and Corinne Godeau produced a documentary on the Uprising entitled L'Insurrection de l'île rouge, Madagascar 1947.
