= Democratic Movement for Malagasy Rejuvenation =

Political party in Madagascar

Democratic Movement for Malagasy Rejuvenation Mouvement démocratique de la rénovation malgache
- Founder: Joseph Ravoahangy; Joseph Raseta; Jacques Rabemananjara
- Founded: February 22, 1946
- Banned: May 10, 1947
- Ideology: Anticolonialism; Malagasy nationalism

The Democratic Movement for Malagasy Rejuvenation (French: Mouvement démocratique de la rénovation malgache, MDRM) was the first Malagasy political party to be represented in the French National Assembly, taking advantage of the reforms announced by Charles de Gaulle at the Brazzaville Conference of 1944.

== Founding and ideology ==
At the first post-war constituent assembly convened in Paris in November 1945 to draft the constitution of the French Fourth Republic, the non-citizen population of Madagascar was represented by two doctors, Joseph Raseta and Joseph Ravoahangy. They formed the MDRM political party together with Négritude poet Jacques Rabemananjara in early 1946; all three leaders were descendants of prominent Hova courtiers. The party's platform was built on national independence from France. The movement was pacifist, and while it sought independence for Madagascar, it embraced the French vision of the island as part of the global Francophone economic and cultural community. Their platform garnered mass support that cut across geographic, ethnic and class divisions, and in November 1946 the trio were elected to represent Madagascar as deputies (députés) in the French National Assembly.

Merina Hova elites founded the MDRM not only in the interest of liberating all Malagasy from French rule, but to regain the political dominance of the Merina upon independence. In reaction to the founding of the MDRM, in 1946 the Parti des déshérités de Madagascar ("Party of the Disinherited of Madagascar"; PADESM) was formed. It attracted membership from coastal communities formerly subjugated by the Merina empire, as well as highland descendants of slaves of Merina masters. Initially a non-nationalist party, PADESM eventually favored a gradual process toward independence that would preserve close ties to France and prevent the reemergence of the precolonial Merina hegemony. The Socialist-dominated French authorities tacitly supported PADESM, seeking to cast themselves as champions of the oppressed masses against the exploitative Hova elites.

== Role in nationalist movement ==
The MDRM deputies submitted a bill in late 1946 for the independence of Madagascar from French rule, but French deputies rejected it. The deputies' nationalist efforts attracted the disapproval of France's Socialist Prime Minister, Paul Ramadier, and the Minister of the Colonies, Marius Moutet, who received the MDRM quest for independence as a blow to French prestige and authority. It also raised the specter of the violent conflict launched by Vietnamese nationalists in French Indochina the month before.

Moutet consequently responded by declaring a "war against the Malagasy autonomy movement", leading to a radicalization of the militant nationalist groups in Madagascar. Sensing the worsening mood in the country, on 27 March 1947 deputies Raseta, Ravoahangy and Rabemananjara jointly issued a statement, urging the public to "maintain absolute calm and coolness in the face of maneuverings and provocations of all kind destined to stir up troubles among the Malagasy population and to sabotage the peaceful policy of the MDRM."

This entreaty was not obeyed, and on 29 March 1947 militant nationalists launched a two-year insurrection against colonial rule, known as the Malagasy Uprising. On 6 May 1947, in Moramanga, soldiers machine-gunned MDRM officials detained in wagons, killing between 124 and 160 mostly unarmed MDRM activists. According to the official accounts of the French general staff the repression caused 89,000 Malagasy deaths in the first 20 months of the insurrection. The colonial forces lost 1,900 Malagasy auxiliary men in battle. 550 Europeans were killed, including 350 soldiers.

== Banning of MDRM ==
Although the MDRM leadership consistently maintained its innocence, the party was outlawed by the French colonial rulers. From July to October 1948 in Antananarivo, the French organized a large public trial of the uprising, charging 77 officials of the MDRM. The French authorities claimed that their public statements calling for calm immediately prior to the outbreak of violence had been a diversion tactic to mask their involvement in organizing the rebellion, which they had secretly launched by way of an encoded telegram. Deputies Ravoahangy and Rabemananjara were arrested and imprisoned on 12 April 1947, followed two months later by Raseta (who was in Paris when the Uprising began), after their parliamentary immunity was revoked by the National Assembly. Debates about the Malagasy Uprising in the French National Assembly on 1 August 1947 concluded with the decision to revoke this immunity for all three deputies, who were tortured in prison.

The trial, which was held from 22 July to 4 October 1948, was marked by numerous irregularities. The principal witness for the prosecution was shot dead three days before the trial, and much of the evidence against the defendants was obtained through torture. All three were found guilty of conspiracy against the state and endangering national security. Although these irregularities were raised at the trial, Ravoahangy was sentenced to death, along with Raseta and four other nationalists, while Rabemananjara was sentenced to life in prison. In July 1949, the convicts' death sentences were commuted to life in prison, and the trio remained imprisoned until they were granted amnesty in 1958. Few individuals, with the notable exception of Monja Jaona, the founder of the Jiny political movement in the south, have claimed responsibility for a leadership role in the insurrection.

== See also ==
- Congress Party for the Independence of Madagascar—Merina-dominated Communist party which claimed the legacy of the MDRM
- Vy Vato Sakelika—nationalist secret society involved in the Insurrection

== Bibliography ==
- Masson, Antoine; O'Connor, Kevin (2007). Representations of Justice. Brussels: Peter Lang. ISBN 978-90-5201-349-7.
- Quemeneur, Tramor (2004). 100 fiches d'histoire du XXe siècle (in French). Paris: Editions Bréal. ISBN 978-2-7495-0341-7.
