= Betsileo people =

Ethnic group in Madagascar

Betsileo
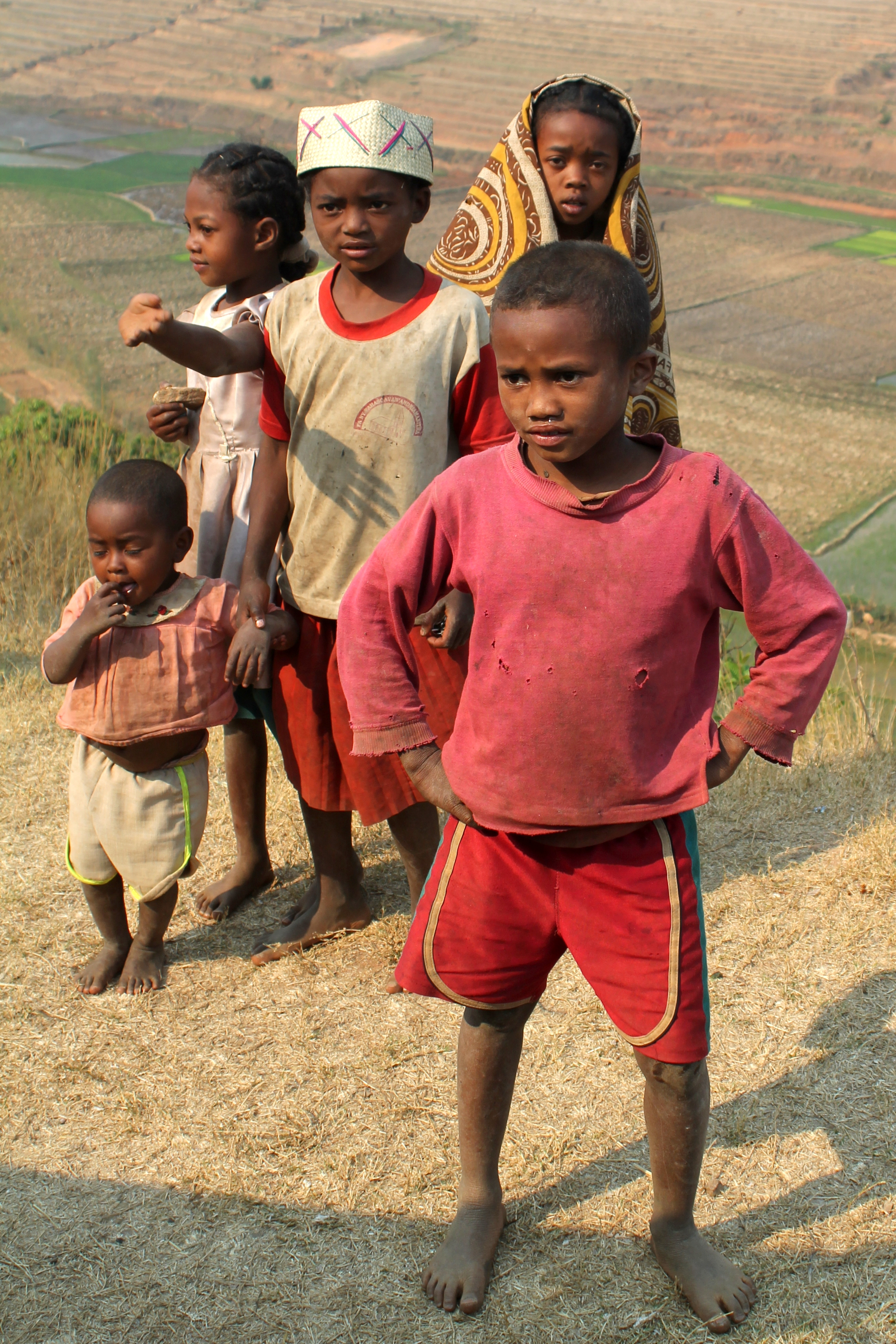
- Betsileo children

Total population
- c. 4.359 million

Regions with significant populations
- Madagascar

Languages
- Betsileo

Related ethnic groups
- Austronesian peoples, Bantu people, Merina, other Malagasy people

The Betsileo are a highland ethnic group of Madagascar, the third largest in terms of population. They derive their name, meaning "The Many Invincible Ones", from King Besilau who repelled an invasion by the Sakalava-Menabe kingdom in the 1670s.

== Territory ==
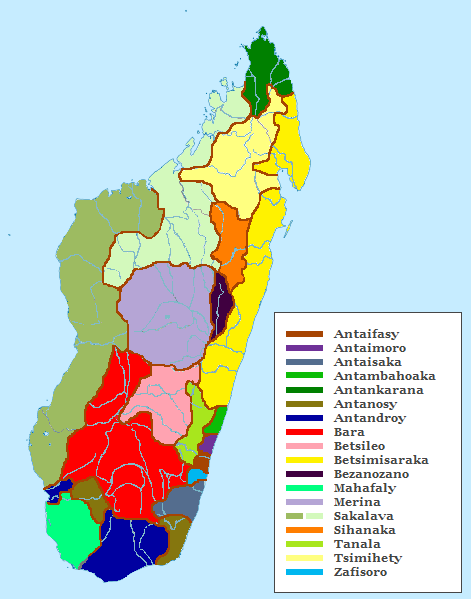
Distribution of Malagasy ethnic groups: the Betsileo in pink at center

The Betsileo occupy the south of the Madagascar plateau. Their traditional territory extends from the north of the Mania River in the north to the foot of the Andringitra Massif in the south; to the west by the Bongolava chain and the east by the Eastern Forest, occupied by the Tanala tribe. Most of the Betsileo region lies within the boundaries of the Malagasy province of Fianarantsoa, where their capital city of the same name can be found.

Traditionally their territory and their people are divided into three major parts. The Northern Betsileo (or Fisakana) is defined by the Ivato and Manandona rivers in the north and the Sahanivotry and Mania rivers to the south. The Central Betsileo (or Manandriana) is found between the Ivato and the Matsiatra rivers. The Southern Betsileo is all the Betsileo territory to the south of the Matsiatra river (the Isandra, Lalangina, Iarindrano and Andringitra).

== History ==
The different Betsileo kingdoms (Fandriana, Fisakana, Manandriana, Isandra, etc.) existed independently of each other with oral traditions dating back to the 17th century. They were all eventually conquered and reorganized by Radama I. A large portion of the Betsileo people were made into slaves and traded domestically or sold to European slave traders. Radama I made Fianarantsoa the administrative capital of the central and southern Betsileo people. The north was attached to Antsirabe. Thus the Betsileo as a group began in the 19th century as an administrative subdivision by the Malagasy government.

Kotomanga, a Betsileo man in Saint Mary of Marovoay 1911-1912.

== Society ==
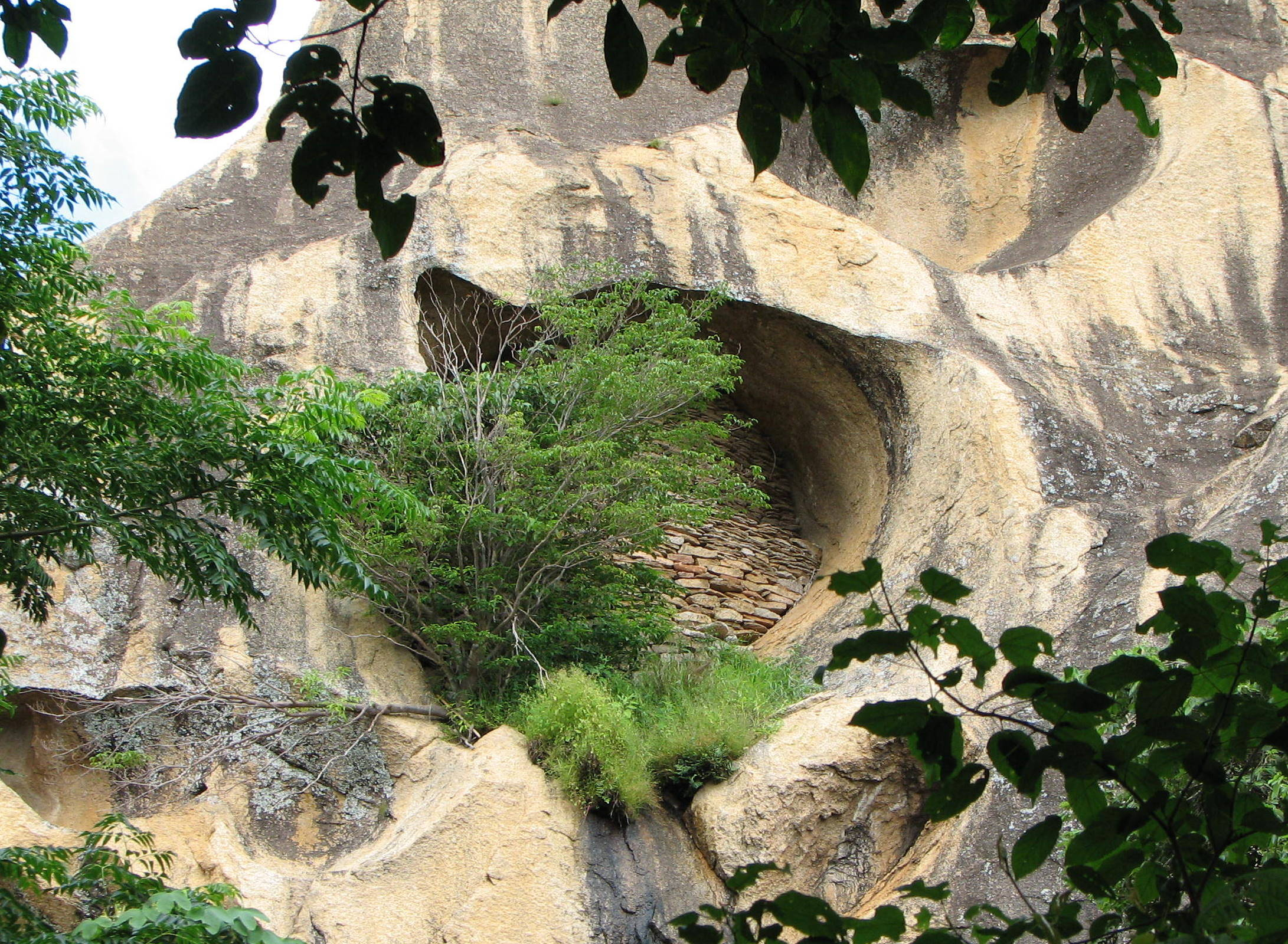
Betsileo tomb

The Betsileo identity is closely associated with the Merina culture, since they are both highland-dwelling groups. The Betsileo social structure is determined by a very complex system of kinship. There is a close connection between family members permeating society to the level of administrative roles and jobs, as most Betsileo are obligated to join their relatives in the family occupation. There is also considerable emphasis on the role of elders as community leaders. Community elders often hold more authority than those in formal government positions.

=== Class affiliation ===
Betsileo society is influenced by a long history of slavery before its abolition during the French colonization. The Betsileo have a complex system of social organization determined through a number of stratifications. The status structure of the Betsileo is principally determined by the ancestry of an individual’s family. Status was historically split between andriana (nobles), hova (free commoners) and andevo (slaves), the latter being a highly stigmatized term for the lowest social class in contemporary Betsileo society.

=== Religious affiliation ===
Since the arrival of European missionaries in the nineteenth century, much of the Malagasy population has since been converted to Christianity. About 94% of Betsileo are Christians. Most Betsileo are either Protestant or Catholic, but much of their ancestral traditions and religious tenets are still observed, often alongside or in concert with Christian practices. Pre-Christian Betsileo beliefs recognized a supernatural realm of ancestral spirits, ghosts, and nature spirits similar to animism practiced in other parts of the world. A creator deity named Zanahary was also recognized, and is still invoked for ceremonial purposes. The competing influences of European monotheism and native religion in Madagascar resulted in a unique system of religious customs in which Christian practices and traditional tenets were combined in ceremonies and belief.

One of the most significant Betsileo ceremonies that still takes place is the famadihana, or “turning of the bones,” during which the remains of Bestileo ancestors are taken out of their tombs and wrapped in new linens and celebrated. Similar religious ceremonials can also be found in Toraja, South Sulawesi and Dayaks in Kalimantan and also in various other places in Indonesia.

== Culture ==
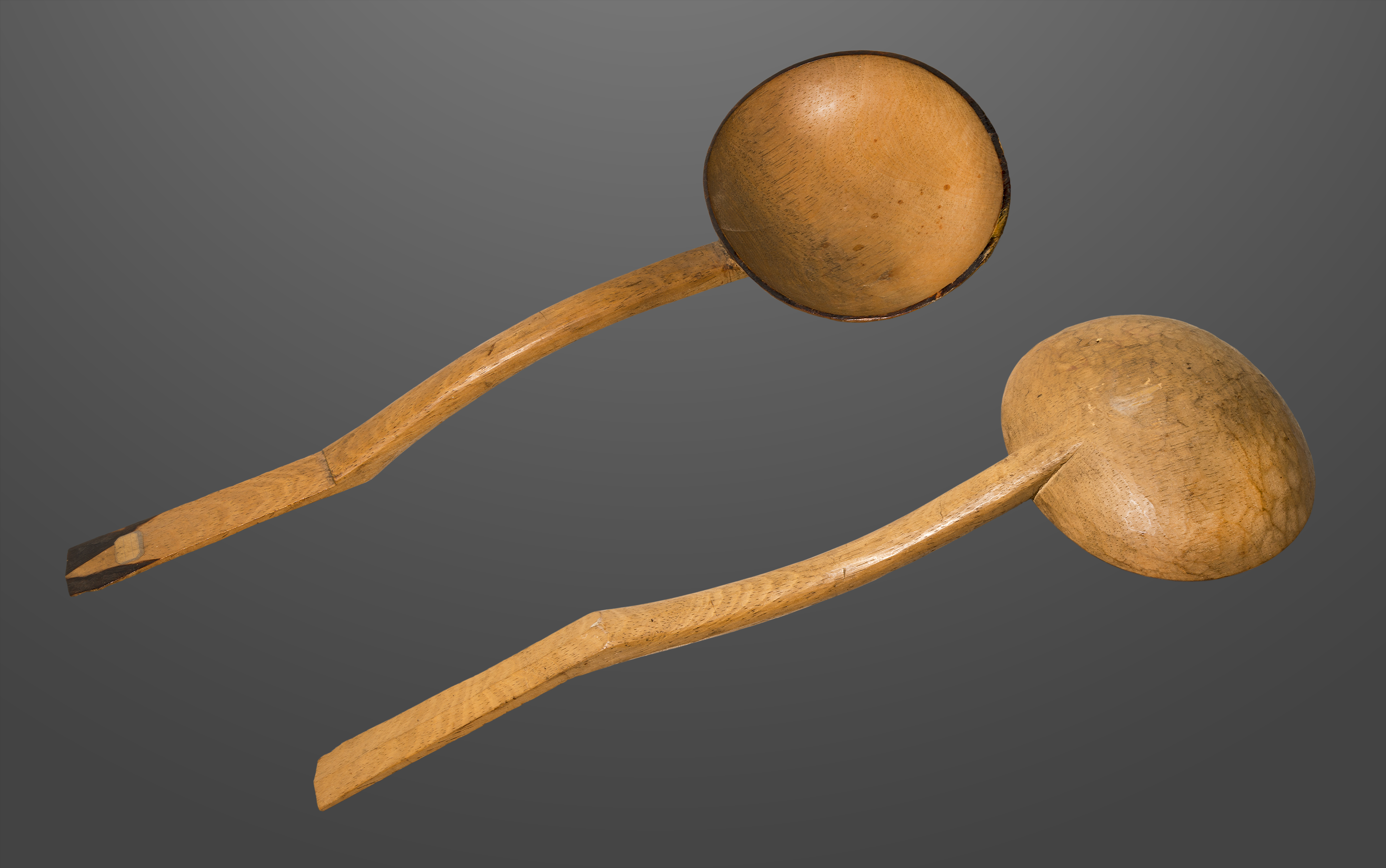
Wooden spoons, 19th century (kept at the MHNT)

The Betsileo are, like the majority of Madagascar's population, a mix of Bantu African and Austronesian descent. They have a more pronounced Bantu phenotype than the Merinas, but a more pronounced Austronesian phenotype than the Malagasy coastal ethnic groups.

Traditionally, they claim a common heritage with the Antemoro from the east coast and the Bara from further south. They traditionally lived in huts made of vegetable fiber, reserving wooden huts for the nobles, per Malagasy architectural norms. Both were often adorned with decorative motifs or even the horns of zebu. Nowadays mud and brick houses are more common.

The Betsileo region of Fianarantsoa is characterized by hills and valleys with rice paddies carved into the sides of them in elaborate terracing systems, in a style reminiscent of those in Southeast Asia. The Betsileo diet almost invariably consists of rice accompanied with livestock such as beef, chicken, or duck and secondary crops like cassava, beans and other farm vegetables. Cattle raising is also important, though not as significant as in neighboring groups like the Bara. The people are excellent woodcarvers and are known for their large wooden sculptures.

Despite the prevalence of Christianity, the role of diviners, astrologists and witch doctors in Betsileo society is also still significant. Witch doctors are believed to be able to manipulate magic as well as converse with ancestors, and can be consulted for reasons ranging from health issues to poisoning. Astrologists and diviners are consulted to set dates for ceremonies or read people’s futures.

== Language ==
The Betsileo speak a dialect of the Malagasy language, which is a branch of the Malayo-Polynesian language group derived from the Barito languages, spoken in southern Borneo.

== Economy ==
The Betsileo are known for their agricultural background and prowess as farmers. Their economic mainstay is rice cultivation, which is a staple food in Madagascar. The size and yield of a family's rice plot often demarcates the wealth of that family.

== Notable people ==
- Jean Ralaimongo
- Manandafy Rakotonirina
