= Samuel Rakotondrabe =

Malagasy politician and nationalist leader

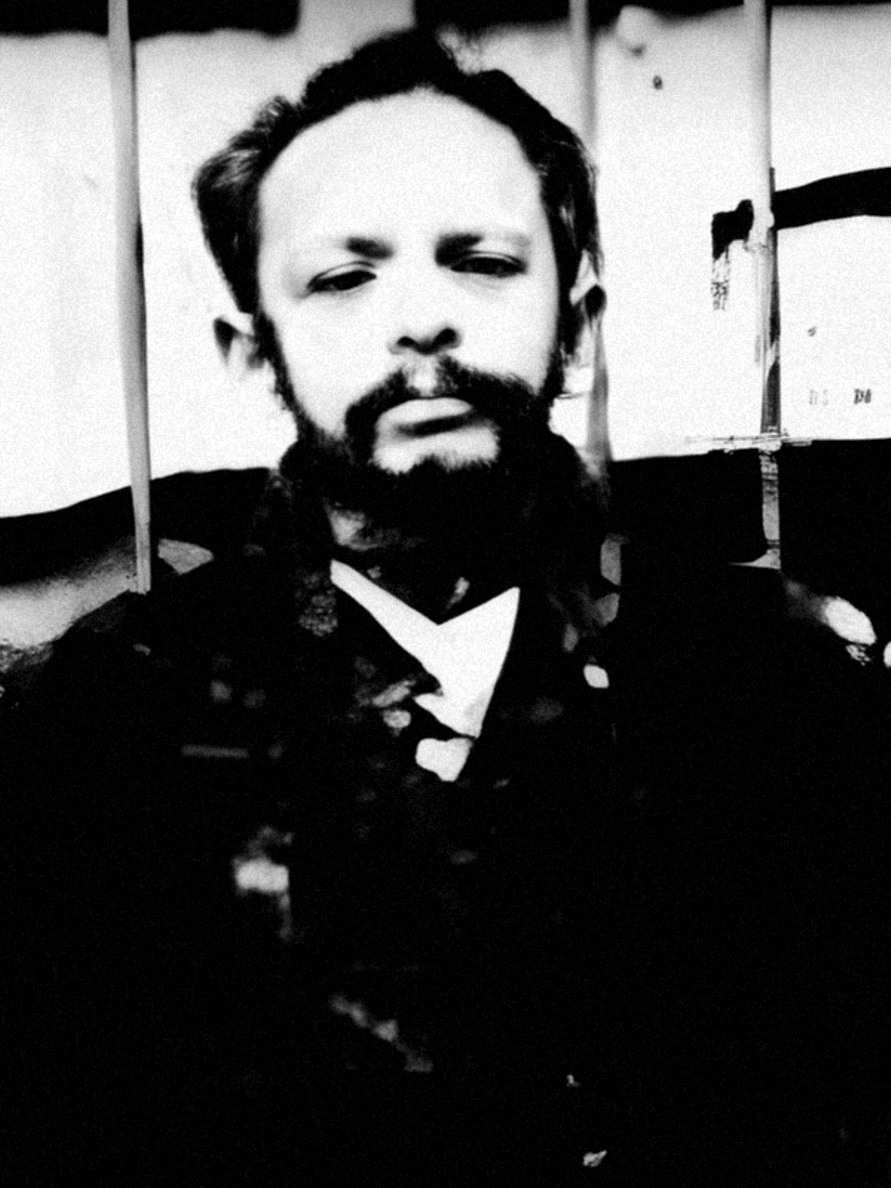
- Samuel Rakotondrabe, mastermind of 1947 Uprising in Madagascar

Personal details
- Born: 1901 Soavina, Betafo, Madagascar
- Died: July 19, 1948 (aged 46–47) Ankatso, Antananarivo, Madagascar
- Citizenship: French (from 1944)
- Party: MDRM (until 1946), JINA (leader)
- Children: 6
- Occupation: Businessman, nationalist leader

Military service
- Battles/wars: Malagasy Uprising

Samuel Rakotondrabe (born 1901 in Soavina, Betafo, Madagascar – executed 19 July 1948 in Ankatso, Antananarivo) was a Malagasy businessman and nationalist figure, remembered as one of the main leaders of the Malagasy Uprising.

== Biography ==
Samuel Rakotondrabe is a Merina born in 1901 at Soavina, Betafo, in today Vakinankaratra region, Madagascar. Rakotondrabe was one of the most prominent Malagasy entrepreneurs of his time. He developed business ventures in retail trade, tobacco processing, transport, real estate, and rural product collection. He founded Bateravola, which became the first major Malagasy-owned industrial group.

His company directly rivaled several major colonial firms such as Henri Fraise & Fils, François Bonnet & Fils, Compte & Cie, Cie Mellis, Plantation Millot, Cie Marseillaise, Cie Larochefortaise, and the Groupe Bourbon.

In December 1944, he became a French citizen and moved to Tananarive to manage Bateravola's main factory. He joined the MDRM in early 1946 but resigned in September the same year. He later became one of the key organizers and funders of the clandestine nationalist youth movement JINA, which played a central role in preparing the uprising. JINA, active since the interwar period, was considered an ultra-nationalist secret society. Alongside the Malagasy Nationalist Party (PANAMA), it operated through rituals rooted in traditional beliefs and framed the fight for independence as a form of spiritual warfare.

In July 1946, Rakotondrabe played a leading role in early resistance movements. By March 1947, during the Malagasy Uprising, he was considered the generalissimo of the rebellion. He left Tananarive for his country home on 27 March 1947. Arrested during the night of 16 May 1947, he was interrogated by French authorities, then sentenced to death by a military tribunal following a summary trial. He was executed by firing squad on 19 July 1948 in Ankatso, Antananarivo, just as his request for clemency reached the administration. He was 47 years old.

His execution took place only weeks after that of Albert Randriamaromanana, a former French colonial army lieutenant accused of planning an attack on Tananarive. The deaths of both men, who were prominent in the nationalist underground, left the main MDRM trial lacking crucial witnesses. Following Rakotondrabe's execution, the French colonial administration confiscated all his property and assets. The land where the Bateravola company headquarters once stood, located in Antanimena, was later taken over and is now occupied by the commercial complex known as Victoria Plaza, currently under Chinese ownership.

He was executed along with three other nationalists. Ratsizafy Samuel, a merchant, held the rank of general among the insurgents. Bekamisy and Lezoma, both from Vatomandry, served as liaisons between nationalist forces in the east and those around Antananarivo.

Rakotondrabe is buried in Imerintsihadino, in the commune of Imerikasinina.

== Legacy ==
A commemorative plaque and two stone memorials were later erected at the execution site in Ankatso. In July 2007, a street in Antanimena, Antananarivo was named after him.

== See also ==
- Malagasy Uprising
- History of Madagascar
