= Monja Jaona =

Malagasy politician (1910-1994)

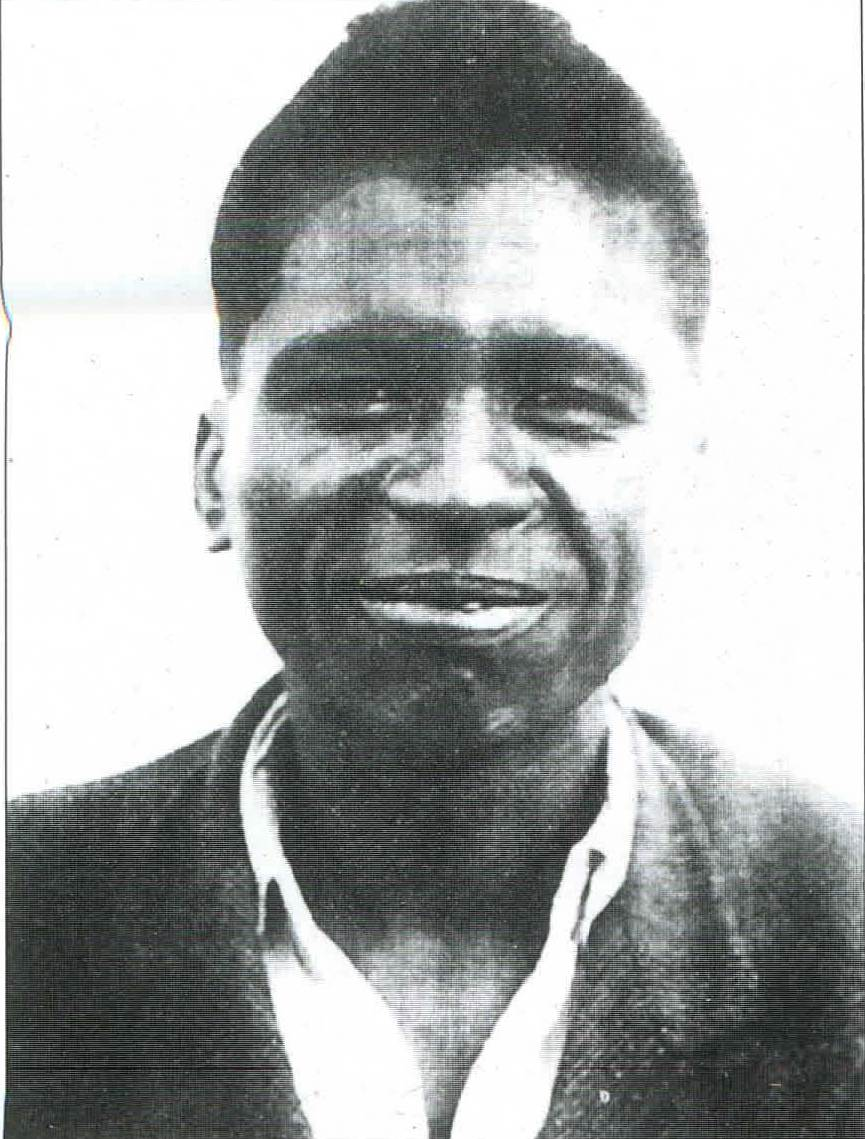
- Monja Jaona in 1945
- Born: September 1910; Amboasary, French Madagascar
- Died: 3 September 1994 (aged 83–84); Antananarivo, Madagascar
- Years active: 1935–1994
- Political party: MONIMA

Monja Jaona (September 1910 – 3 September 1994) was a Malagasy politician and early nationalist who significantly drove political events on the island during his lifetime. He was a member of Jiny, a militant nationalist group formed in southern Madagascar in the 1940s that sided with MDRM during the ultimately unsuccessful Malagasy Uprising of 1947 against French rule. The colonial government imprisoned him from 1946 to 1950 for his affiliation with Jiny. He formed the Madagascar for the Malagasy (MONIMA) party in 1958 and successfully campaigned for the seat of mayor in Toliara, a position he held from 1959 to 1961. He came to view president Philibert Tsiranana and his Social Democratic Party (PSD) supporters as unduly favorable to continued French interests on the island after independence in 1960. Jaona instigated the 1971–72 rotaka farmer and student protests that successfully forced Tsiranana's resignation.

By the late 1970s he had become disillusioned with Tsiranana's socialist successor, Didier Ratsiraka, and transferred his political loyalties to the opposition. He ran in the presidential election against Ratsiraka in 1982 and lost by a large margin, but claimed the results were falsified and demanded a recount. He was placed under house arrest and then medical detention, while his lawyer was expelled to France. He unsuccessfully ran again in 1989. He was a leading figure in protests from 1989 to 1992 that forced Ratsiraka's resignation and the first free multiparty election in Madagascar, resulting in the election of Albert Zafy. Jaona died in 1994 at the age of 84.

Jaona's son, Monja Roindefo, followed his father in politics and became leading opposition figure in the MONIMA party. He served as Prime Minister of Madagascar from March to September 2009 immediately following the successful March 2009 coup d'état led by Andry Rajoelina of the Young Malagasies Determined political party.

== Early years ==
- 1910 - Monja Jaona, Malagasy politician and early nationalist, was born in September at Amboasary. [much of the below information is from ]
- 1929 - At the age of 19, moved north to work on one of the large plantations there. Met Pastor Jean Vernier and became a Christian.
- - Moved back south to Manambaro, where he worked for the Lutheran mission

== Nationalist politician ==
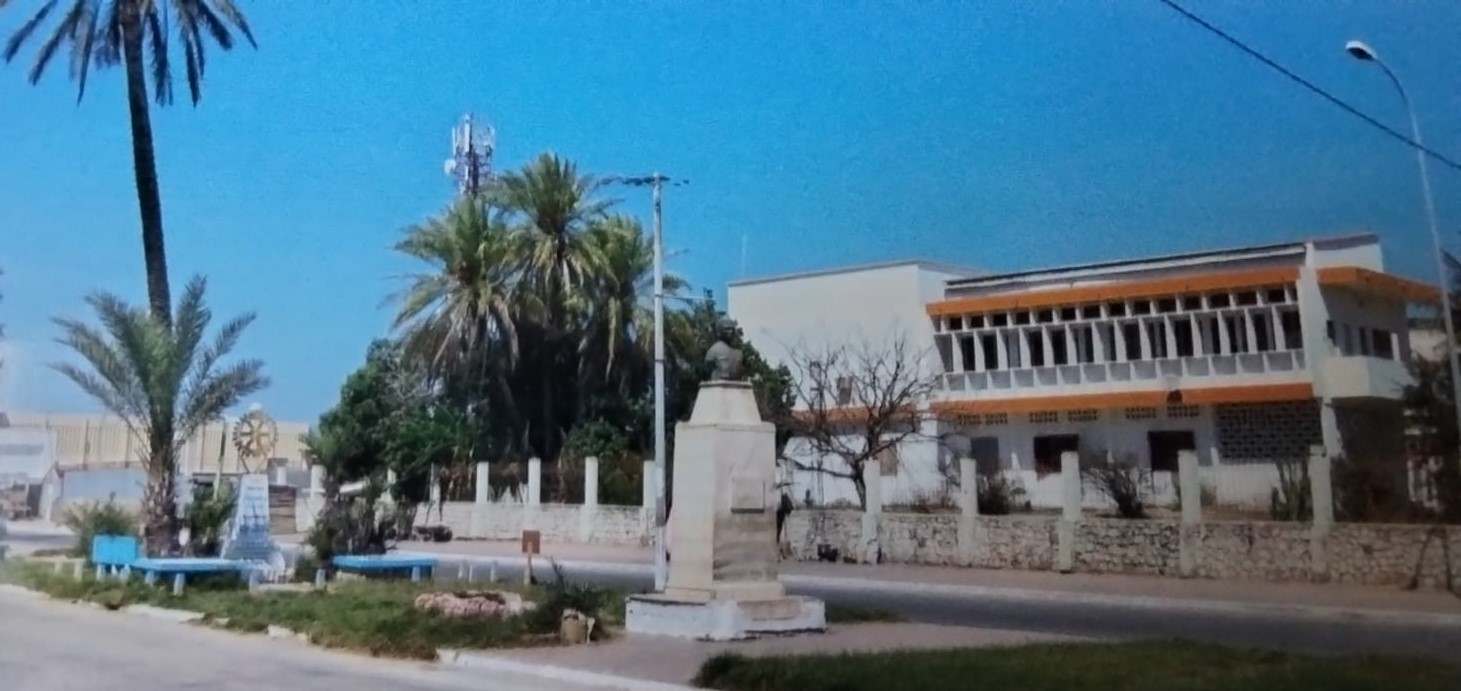
Monument of Monja Jaona in Toliara

- 1935 - Began his political career, fighting for the rights of peasants
- 1939 - Joined French Forces and while sent to France, did not arrive there, but was rather sent back to Madagascar after the Franco-German Armistice of 1940 and demobilized several months later
- - Placed under house arrest first at Lake Alaotra then Manakara where, he founded the JINA in 1943.
- 1945 - Campaigned for Dr. Ravoahangy
- 1946 - Established contacts with the Mouvement démocratique de la rénovation malgache (MDRM)
- 1946 - Imprisoned in September by French Colonial government due to the "Decree Cayla"
- 1950 - Released from prison, though still harassed by colonial administration
- 1955 - Settled in Tulear
- 1958 - Formed the Madagasikara Otronin'ny Malagasy (MONIMA)--Madagascar for the Malagasy—party in Tulear which he led till his death. This became a significant regional party which represented radical intellectuals and peasants from the south.
- 1959 - Became Mayor of Toliara, a post he held till 1961
- 1960 - Madagascar became independent

== Role in the 1971-72 rotaka ==
Jaona played a leading role in a series of protest movements in 1971-72, collectively termed the rotaka, that resulted in the forced resignation of President Tsiranana.

- 1971 - Claimed authorship of 1–2 April armed insurrection by impoverished peasants in Androy who were upset by corruption of government tax collectors at a time when their cattle herds were being ravaged by diseases. There were also frustrations due to the failure of the government to provide disaster relief in response to a serious drought which was followed by floods. More than 1,000 armed members of the MONIMA attacked 5 military posts in the Tulear province, resulting in 1 of the security forces killed and 11 wounded. This was quickly and harshly suppressed by the government, with 45 of the MONIMA killed, 9 wounded and 847 held for questioning. Many MONIMA members were sent by cargo ship from Fort Dauphin to Nosy Lava where they were imprisoned.
- 1972 - Monja Jaona and the MONIMA party, which had become a left-wing opposition movement, gained the support of university students and urban radicals who led demonstrations in Antananarivo, Antsirabe and elsewhere against President Tsiranana, leading to his resignation in May 1972.

== Opposition leader ==
- 1977 - MO.NI.MA. left the Front National pour la Defense de la Révolution (FNDR), rejoining it in 1981, leaving it again in 1987
- 1982 - Monja Jaona ran against President Ratsiraka, lost, denounced results as fraudulent and put under house arrest until 1983
- 1989 - Ran for Presidential Election again, but only received 4% of the vote
- 1992 - Wounded in March by police during a confrontation at Fiadanana

== Death and legacy ==
- 1994 - Died September 3 at the age of 84

== Bibliography ==
- Raison-Jourde, Françoise; Roy, Gérard (2010). Paysans, intellectuels et populisme à Madagascar: de Monja Jaona à Ratsimandrava, 1960-1975 (in French). Paris: Karthala Editions. ISBN 9782811103958.
