= 1965 Malagasy presidential election =

30 March 1965	1972 →
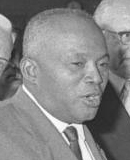

Nominee	Philibert Tsiranana	Joseph Raseta
Party	PSD	FIPIMA
Popular vote	2,451,441	54,814
Percentage	97.78%	2.19%
President before election
Philibert Tsiranana
PSD
Elected President
Philbert Tsiranana
PSD

Presidential elections were held for the first time in Madagascar on 30 March 1965. Incumbent President Philibert Tsiranana of the Social Democratic Party dominated the campaign and was elected with 98% of the vote.

== Results ==
Candidate	Party	Votes	%
Philibert Tsiranana	Social Democratic Party	2,451,441	97.78
Joseph Raseta	National Malagasy Union	54,814	2.19
Alfred Razafiarisoa	Independent	812	0.03
Total		2,507,067	100.00
Valid votes		2,507,067	99.44
Invalid/blank votes		14,149	0.56
Total votes		2,521,216	100.00
Registered voters/turnout		2,583,051	97.61
Source: Saura
