= Joseph Raseta =

Malagasy politician

- Raseta as a deputy of the French National Assembly, c. 1946 – c. 1951

Deputy (France)
- In office November 6, 1945 – July 4, 1951

Deputy (Madagascar)
- In office 1961–Unknown

Personal details
- Born: Joseph-Delphin Raseta; December 9, 1886 Marovoay
- Died: October 5, 1979 (aged 92) Antananarivo
- Citizenship: Madagascar; France
- Party: MDRM (1940s)
- Other political affiliations: AKFM (1960–1963); FIPIMA (1963–)
- Profession: Physician

Joseph Raseta (December 9, 1886 – October 5, 1979) was a Malagasy physician, politician, and intellectual who co-founded the Democratic Movement for Malagasy Renewal with Joseph Ravoahangy-Andrianavalona and Jacques Rabemananjara.

== Biography ==
=== Early life ===
Joseph-Delphin Raseta was born to a Hova family in Marovoay on December 9, 1886. His grandfather was a palace official and commander of the Mahajanga garrison in the Franco-Malagasy War of 1883–1885, and his father the governor of Iboina and deka (aide-de-camp) to Prime Minister Rainilaiarivony.

After studying in Antananarivo at a Lasallian school as well as a Quaker school run by the Friends' Foreign Mission Association, he graduated from the city's medical school in 1908. He served as a medical officer at the Assistance médicale indigène from 1909–1922—during this time, in October 1915, he joined Vy Vato Sakelika (transl. Iron, Stone, Cutting), a secret society of nationalist students. The leaders of the VVS were convicted of plotting against the state in early 1916, but Raseta was not charged. This fact would provoke suspicion toward him later in life, seemingly lending credibility to the allegation of police provocation of the 1947 Insurrection.

=== Entry into politics ===
After opening a private practice in Toliara in 1922, in 1926 Raseta became a correspondent for the anticolonial newspaper L'opinion de Diego Suarez. He was unsuccessfully charged in 1927 with forestry-related offenses, and in 1929 and 1930 for soliciting donations on behalf of Jean Ralaimongo. In 1933, he made a public appeal on behalf of a village whose land had been awarded to a colonist, describing the 1926 land decree which enabled this as "criminally evil" (French: scélérat); for this he was sentenced to a 500 ₣ fine and three years of restricted freedom of movement for insulting the governor-general, but was acquitted on appeal. In 1935 he was barred from practicing medicine and charged with involuntary manslaughter after the death of an Indian patient he treated for diabetic gangrene, but was again acquitted on appeal.

Raseta joined the International Red Aid, which represented the French Communist Party in the colonies, and in 1934 joined the League against Imperialism. He contributed to L'Aurore Malgache and Opinion, and in 1935 became a founding owner, with 10% of shares, of the new paper La Nation malgache; he simultaneously worked as a correspondent for L'Humanité and the Prolétariat malgache, founded in late 1936. The latter was the organ of the Communist Party, Madagascar Region (PCRM), of which he was a member from its founding in August 1936 until its dissolution in 1939; Raseta, however, was a nationalist rather than a Communist. Sentenced to two years of internment at a camp in Moramanga by the Vichy authorities under the Indigénat, he was released in 1943 and resumed his political activities.

=== Deputy of the Constituent Assembly ===
Raseta was elected to the French Constituent Assembly of 1945, and reelected in June 1946. He arrived in France in December 1945, and in Paris in 1946 he co-founded the MDRM, becoming the party's first president. Raseta kept a low profile in the first Constituent Assembly, speaking before the Assembly only three times, during debate on a bill to determine the composition and function of colonial local assemblies, and during that of a bill regarding local assemblies on Madagascar. On March 21, 1946, he submitted a bill to designate Madagascar a "free state within the French Union," only for it to be buried in committee. Nevertheless, the repeal of the Indigénat and ban on forced labor assured him a triumphal welcome in Antananarivo on May 5 of that year. In the second Constituent Assembly he reiterated his demand on August 9 in the form of a proposed resolution to hold a referendum on Madagascar, which was rejected. He addressed the Assembly twice, notably on September 19 regarding the draft constitution's chapter on the French Union.

=== Conviction in the "trial of the parliamentarians" ===
Reelected again on November 10, 1946, Raseta returned to France on March 9 of the following year and was named to the new National Assembly's Committee on the Family, Population, and Public Health. Following the outbreak of the Malagasy Insurrection on March 29, 1947, he questioned the government on its Madagascar policy on May 6, but on May 20 was called before a commission of inquiry, headed by Maurice Viollette, on accusations of involvement in the revolt. Raseta denied any such involvement and publicly condemned the rebellion; nevertheless, after a long debate on June 4, the Assembly voted 234–195 to lift his immunity. Arrested and transferred to Antananarivo, he was taken to court in the "trial of the parliamentarians" (July–September 1948) and sentenced to death. After losing an appeal before the Court of Cassation on July 7, 1949, President Vincent Auriol commuted his sentence on July 15 to lifelong detention in exile. (Note: French: « Déportation en enceinte fortifiée », lit. 'Deportation to a fortified enclosure'—a specific penalty in French law for crimes against the state, also notably applied to Alfred Dreyfus and Philippe Pétain.) Raseta was deported to the Comoros, then transferred to Calvi in October 1950, before finally being released on grounds of ill health on August 6, 1955, and put under house arrest in Grasse, then Cannes.

=== Figurehead of Malagasy independence ===
Still influential in nationalist circles, he joined Jacques Rabemananjara in a 1955 appeal for nationalist unity in the 1955 provincial elections, supported Stanislas Rakotonirina's successful 1956 bid to become the first elected mayor of Antananarivo, and in 1958 lent his endorsement to the newly founded Congress Party for the Independence of Madagascar (AKFM), a pro-Soviet Communist party opposed to Philibert Tsiranana and the French Community. While attempting to return to Madagascar with help from the Communists in July 1959, he was taken in for questioning in Djibouti and returned to France.

Finally managing to return to his home country in July 1960, he joined the AKFM and ran for a seat Madagascar's own National Assembly on the party's list in Antananarivo, defeating his former MDRM ally Joseph Ravoahangy and becoming the body's oldest member. Upon the Assembly's reopening in May 1961, Raseta distinguished himself with an incendiary speech against the government. Finding himself outnumbered in the AKFM by moderates inclined to compromise with Tsiranana, however, he left the party in 1963 to found the Malagasy National Union (FIPIMA). At the head of the new party, he ran against Tsiranana in the 1965 presidential election, receiving just 2.19% of the vote. This stinging defeat made clear to Raseta his lack of allies in the opposition—even the AKFM had quietly supported Tsiranana.

With the rise of the socialist Democratic Republic, Raseta was declared a "hero of the revolution" and named a Grand Officer of the Order of Combatants of the Malagasy Revolution by Didier Ratsiraka. Raseta died on October 5, 1979, at the age of 92.

== Electoral history ==
Election	Votes received (%)	Turnout / registered voters (%)	Result
1945 French Constituent Assembly election	5,476 (45.72%)	11,977 / 26,047 (45.98%)	Won
1946 French Constituent Assembly election	13,529 (58.06%)	23,302 / 86,181 (27.04%)	Won
November 1946 French legislative election	21,639 (52.21%)	41,447 / 86,181 (48.09%)	Won
1965 Malagasy presidential election	54,814 (2.19%)	2,521,216 / 2,583,051 (97.61%)	Lost
