= Andevo =

Historic slave caste in the Merina Kingdom of Madagascar

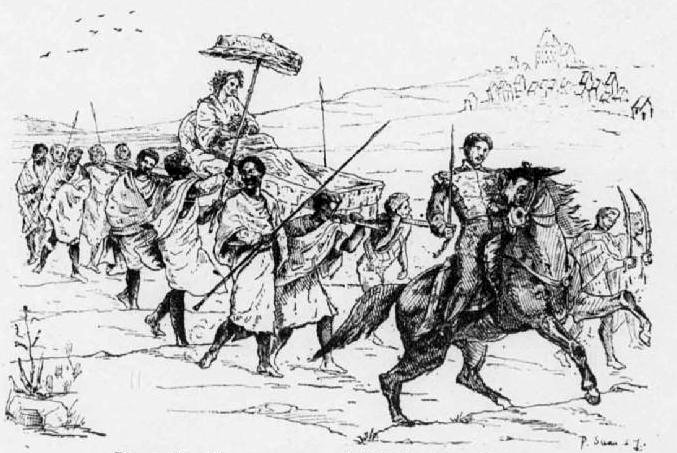
Malagasy slaves (Andevo) carrying Queen Ranavalona I of Madagascar

The Andevo, or slaves, were one of the three principal historical castes among the Merina people of Madagascar, alongside the social strata called the Andriana (nobles) and Hova (free commoners). The Andevo, along with the other social strata, have also historically existed in other large Malagasy ethnic groups such as the Betsileo people.

In and after the 16th century, slaves were brought into Madagascar's various kingdoms to work in plantations. The Malagasy, the Swahili, and the European merchants and nobles expanded their opportunities to produce more and trade. These operations and plantations were worked by the forced labor of imported slaves. The largest influx of slaves was brought in by the 'Umani Arabs via the Indian Ocean slave trade and the French. The Mozambique were one of the major victims of this demand, slave capture and export that attempted to satisfy this demand. These slaves were predominantly from East Africa and Mozambique. These slaves were called Andevo. The slavery was abolished by the French administration in 1896, which adversely impacted the fortunes of Merina and non-Merina operated slave-run plantations.

The Andevo strata in the Merina society have been domestic and plantation workers. Their traditional inherited occupation has been as workers and artisans, and they constituted a large percentage of a society. The Andevo caste were also called the Mainty and they were denied the right to own land. A Hova person could be reduced to a slave for crimes or a debt in default, and in this state he would not be an Andevo, but be referred to as Zaza-hova.

The Andevo, and other social strata were endogamous in the Merina and Betsileo societies. According to William Ellis memoir in 1838, a slave in the Malagasy society was prohibited from marrying a noble or a hova. The Andevo were considered olana maloto, or "impure people", in contrast to Hova and Andriana who were olona madio or "pure people". This presumed "impurity" and "purity" has been a reason for the historic social taboo against inter-marriages between Andevo and non-Andevo strata of the Malagasy societies.

== See also ==
- Merina people
