= Soavina, Betafo =

Soavina
- Location in Madagascar
- Coordinates: 19°48′S 46°44′E
- Country: Madagascar
- Region: Vakinankaratra
- District: Betafo
- Elevation: 1,335 m (4,380 ft)

Population (2001)
  - Total: 20,000
  - Ethnicities: Merina
- Time zone: UTC3 (EAT)

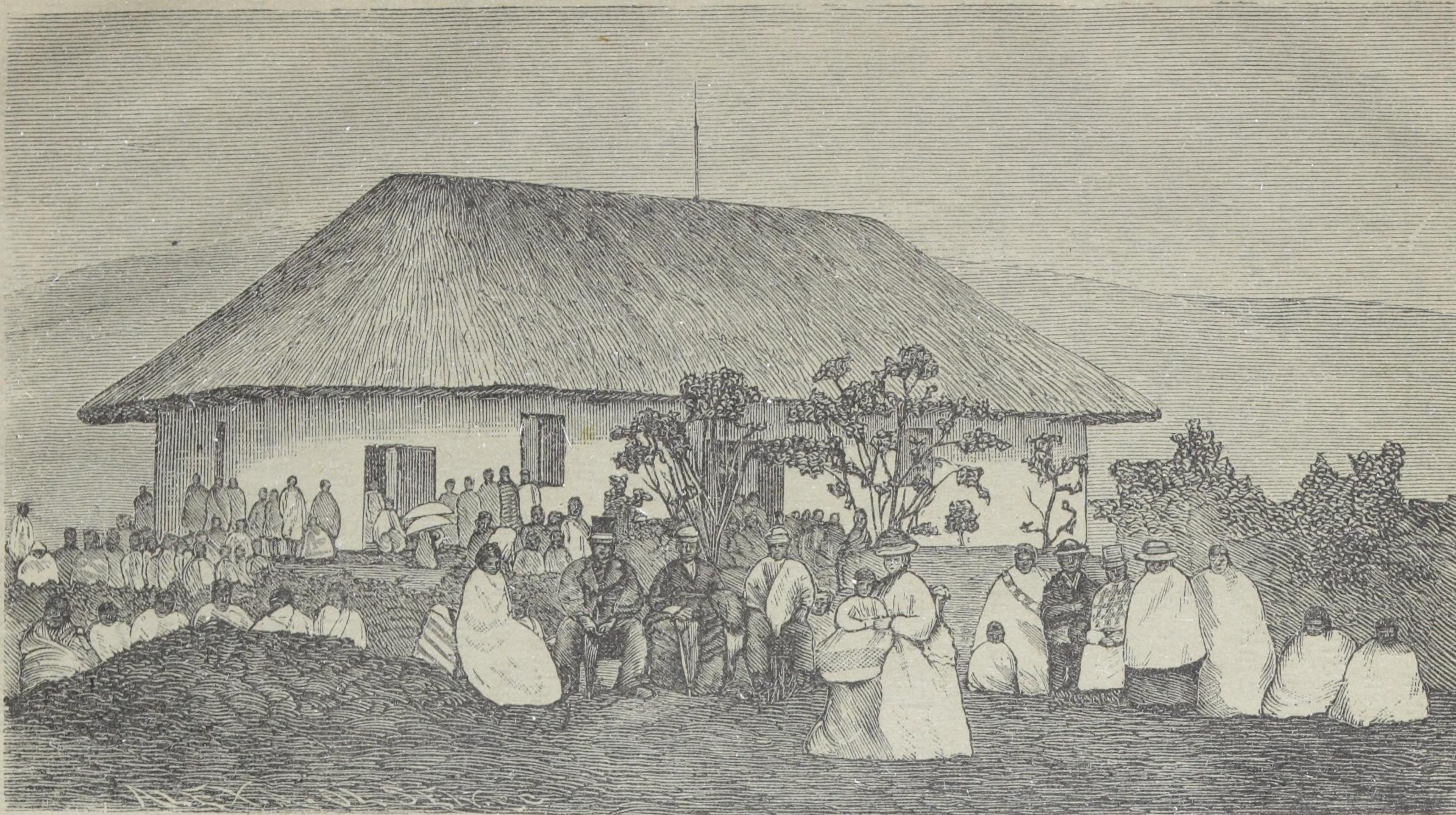
Soavina in 1885.

Soavina is a town and commune in Madagascar. It belongs to the district of Betafo, which is a part of Vakinankaratra Region. The population of the commune was estimated to be approximately 20,000 in 2001 commune census.

Primary and junior level secondary education are available in town. The majority 75% of the population of the commune are farmers, while an additional 25% receives their livelihood from raising livestock. The most important crops are rice and bambara groundnut, while other important agricultural products are maize and cassava.
