= French Madagascar =

1897–1960 French colony off the coast of southeast Africa

Coordinates: 18°56′S 47°31′E

Colony of Madagascar and Dependencies Colonie de Madagascar et dépendances (French) Ny zanatanin'i Madagasikara sy ny miankina aminy (Malagasy)
- 1897–1960
- Flag Coat of arms
- Anthem: "La Marseillaise"
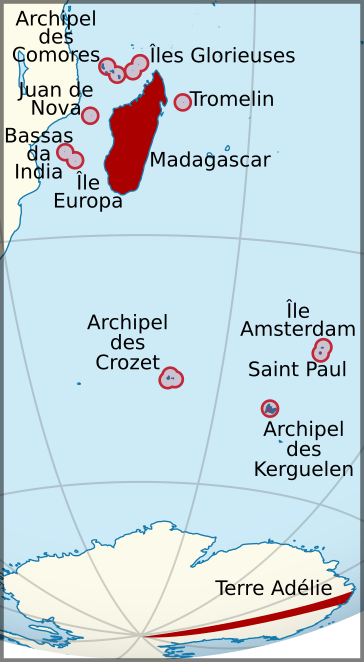
- Colony of Madagascar and Dependencies in 1930
- Status: Colony of France (1897–1946); Overseas Territory of France (1946–1958); Autonomous republic of France (1958-60)
- Capital: Tananarive
- Common languages: French (Official); Malagasy; Comorian; Arabic
- Religion: Christianity; Islam; Traditional beliefs
- Governor-General
  - 1897–1905 (first): Joseph Gallieni
  - 1946–1948 (last): Jules Marcel de Coppet
- High Commissioner
  - 1948–1950 (first): Pierre Gabriel de Chevigné
  - 1953–1959 (last): André Soucadaux
- President
  - 1959–1960: Philibert Tsiranana
- Historical era: New Imperialism
  - Established: 28 February 1897
  - Independence: 14 October 1960

Area
  - Total: 594,890 km^{2} (229,690 sq mi)

Population
  - 1950 estimate: 4,180,000
- Currency: French franc (1897–1925); Malagasy franc (1925–1945); Madagascar-Comores CFA franc (1945–1960)
Preceded by
Merina Kingdom
Malagasy Protectorate
French Comoros
Sakalava empire
Succeeded by
Malagasy Republic
French Comoros
French Southern and Antarctic Lands
Mayotte
- Today part of: Madagascar; Comoros; France; French Southern and Antarctic Lands; Mayotte

The Colony of Madagascar and Dependencies (French: Colonie de Madagascar et dépendances) was a French colony off the coast of Southeast Africa between 1897 and 1958 in what is now Madagascar. The colony was formerly a protectorate of France known as Malagasy Protectorate. The protectorate became a colony, following Queen Ranavalona III's exile to Réunion.

In 1958, the colonial administration in Madagascar was abolished, and it became an autonomous territory of the French Community as the Malagasy Republic, which gained independence in 1960.

== History ==
=== Background and French protectorate ===
The United Kingdom had been an ally of Madagascar. In May 1862, John Russell, 1st Earl Russell, Britain's foreign secretary, instructed Connolly Pakenham that Radama II should keep the country away from foreign powers. In 1882, the French started to occupy much of Madagascar's northern and western territories. In 1883, the Franco-Hova Wars commenced between France and Merina Kingdom, but the outcome remained inconclusive. The British government acted as a restraining hand on France's desire to swallow up the island. On 17 December 1885, Queen Ranavalona III signed the treaty in which Madagascar became a French protectorate, although this was disputed by Madagascar, as well as taking out a loan of 10 million francs. In 1888, the queen was granted the grand cross of the Legion of Honour (the Légion d'Honneur), the highest and most prestigious French order of merit. The queen was reluctantly passionate about preventing her country to fall to France. The queen tried to cease French incursion; however, this remained futile and in September 1895, the queen was forced to surrender Madagascar's capital, Tananarive, to the French.

The queen accepted the treaty to preserve her crown and the monarchy in Madagascar. But France's yearning to expand their colonial empire in Africa meant the treaty proved to be nothing but a ruse. Queen Ranavalona was removed from power and was exiled to the French island of Réunion for two years, then Algiers afterwards. As she went into exile, Madagascar formally became a French colony.

=== Madagascar as French colony ===
French pacification lasted about fifteen years, in response to rural guerrillas scattered throughout the country. In total, the conflicts between the French authorities and Malagasy guerrillas killed more than 100,000 Malagasy people.

The French abolished slavery in 1896 after taking control of Madagascar. Over 500,000 slaves were freed following the abolition. Many former slaves would remain in their former masters' homes as servants.

Nationalist sentiment against French colonial rule emerged among a group of Merina intellectuals. The group, based in Antananarivo, was led by a Malagasy Protestant clergyman, Pastor Ravelojoana, who was especially inspired by the Japanese model of modernization. A secret society dedicated to affirming Malagasy cultural identity was formed in 1913, calling itself Iron and Stone Ramification (Vy Vato Sakelika, VVS). Although the VVS was brutally suppressed, its actions eventually led French authorities to provide the Malagasy with their first representative voice in government.

Malagasy veterans of military service in France during the First World War bolstered the embryonic nationalist movement. Throughout the 1920s, the nationalists stressed labour reform and equality of civil and political status for the Malagasy, stopping short of advocating independence. For example, the French League for Madagascar, under the leadership of Anatole France, demanded French citizenship for all Malagasy people in recognition of their country's wartime contribution of soldiers and resources. A number of veterans who remained in France were exposed to French political thought, most notably the anti-colonial and pro-independence platforms of socialist parties. Jean Ralaimongo, for example, returned to Madagascar in 1924 and became embroiled in labour questions that were causing considerable tension throughout the island.

Among the first concessions to Malagasy equality was the formation in 1924 of two economic and financial delegations. One was composed of French settlers, the other of twenty-four Malagasy representatives elected by the Council of Notables in each of twenty-four districts. The two sections never met together, and neither had real decision-making authority. Huge mining and forestry concessions were granted to large companies. Indigenous leaders loyal to the French administration were also granted part of the land. Forced labour was introduced in favour of the French companies.

The 1930s saw the Malagasy anti-colonial movement gain momentum. Malagasy trade unionism began to appear underground and the Communist Party of the Region of Madagascar was formed. But as early as 1939, all organisations were dissolved by the administration of the colony, which opted for the Vichy regime.

French Madagascar played an important role in the war due to the presence of critically important harbors, the contribution of Malagasy troops, and was also the scene of fighting between Allied and Vichy French forces in 1942. After the fall of France in 1940, Madagascar became a crucial flashpoint in contention between the Free French movement and Vichy France.

Only in the aftermath of the Second World War was France willing to accept a form of Malagasy self-rule under French tutelage. In the autumn of 1945, separate French and Malagasy electoral colleges voted to elect representatives from Madagascar to the Constituent Assembly of the Fourth Republic in Paris. The two delegates chosen by the Malagasy, Joseph Raseta and Joseph Ravoahangy, both campaigned to implement the ideal of the self-determination of peoples affirmed by the Atlantic Charter of 1941 and by the Brazzaville Conference of 1944.

Raseta and Ravoahangy, together with Jacques Rabemananjara, a writer long resident in Paris, organised the Democratic Movement for Malagasy Restoration (MDRM), the foremost among several political parties formed in Madagascar by early 1946. Although Protestant Merina was well represented in MDRM's higher echelons, the party's 300,000 members were drawn from a broad political base reaching across the entire island and crosscutting ethnic and social divisions.Several smaller MDRM rivals included the Party of the Malagasy Disinherited (Parti des Déshérités Malgaches), whose members were mainly côtiers or descendants of slaves from the Central Highlands.

The 1946 constitution of the French Fourth Republic made Madagascar a territoire d'outre-mer (overseas territory) within the French Union. It accorded full citizenship to all Malagasy parallel with that enjoyed by citizens in France. But the assimilationist policy inherent in its framework was incongruent with the MDRM goal of full independence for Madagascar, so Ravoahangy and Raseta abstained from voting. The two delegates also objected to the separate French and Malagasy electoral colleges, even though Madagascar was represented in the French National Assembly. The constitution divided Madagascar administratively into a number of provinces, each of which was to have a locally elected provincial assembly. Not long after, a National Representative Assembly was constituted at Antananarivo. In the first elections for the provincial assemblies, the MDRM won all seats or a majority of seats, except in Mahajanga Province.

Despite these reforms, the political scene in Madagascar remained unstable. Economic and social concerns, including food shortages, black-market scandals, labour conscription, renewed ethnic tensions, and the return of soldiers from France, strained an already volatile situation. Many of the veterans felt they had been less well treated by France than had veterans from metropolitan France; others had been politically radicalised by their wartime experiences. The blend of fear, respect, and emulation on which Franco-Malagasy relations had been based seemed at an end.

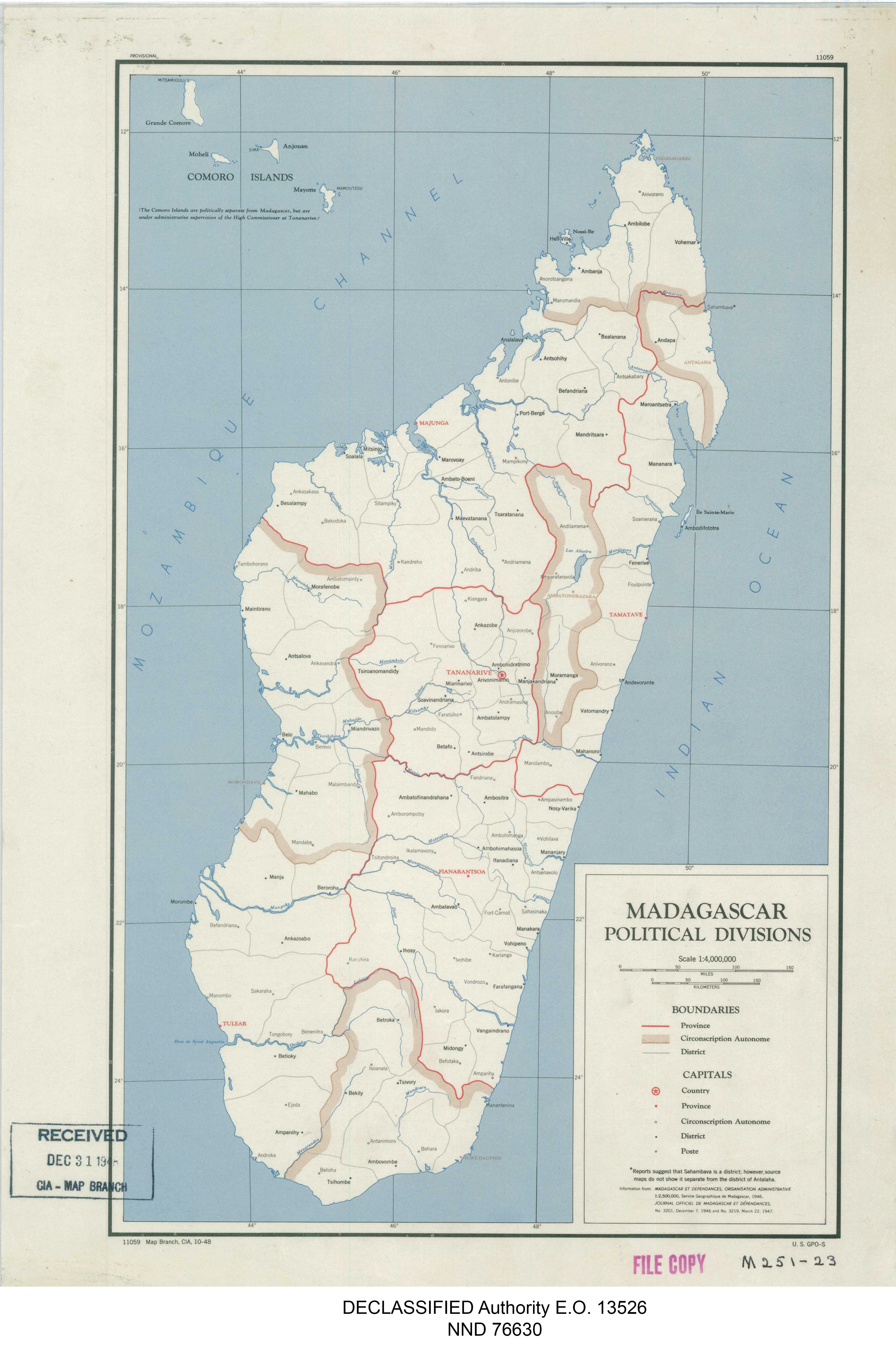
Political divisions of French Madagascar, 1948.

On 29 March 1947, Malagasy nationalists revolted against the French. Although the uprising eventually spread over one-third of the island, the French were able to restore order after reinforcements arrived from France. Casualties among the Malagasy were estimated in the 11,000 to 80,000 range. The repression was accompanied by summary executions, torture, forced regroupings and the burning of villages. The French Army experimented with "psychological warfare": suspects were thrown alive from planes in order to terrorise villagers in the areas of operation. The group of leaders responsible for the uprising, which came to be referred to as the Revolt of 1947, never has been identified conclusively. Although the MDRM leadership consistently maintained its innocence, the French outlawed the party. French military courts tried the military leaders of the revolt and executed twenty of them. Other trials produced, by one report, some 5,000 to 6,000 convictions, and penalties ranged from brief imprisonment to death. According to a source, 90,000 Malagasy people died during the uprising, which was brutally shut down by the French colonial regime.

In 1956, France's socialist government renewed the French commitment to greater autonomy in Madagascar and other colonial possessions by enacting the Loi Cadre (Enabling Law). The Loi Cadre provided for universal suffrage and was the basis for parliamentary government in each colony. In the case of Madagascar, the law established executive councils to function alongside provincial and national assemblies, and dissolved the separate electoral colleges for the French and Malagasy groups. The provision for universal suffrage had significant implications in Madagascar because of the basic ethno-political split between the Merina and the côtiers, reinforced by the divisions between Protestants and Roman Catholics. Superior armed strength and educational and cultural advantages had given the Merina a dominant influence on the political process during much of the country's history. The Merina were heavily represented in the Malagasy component of the small elite to whom suffrage had been restricted in the earlier years of French rule. Now the côtiers, who outnumbered the Merina, would be a majority.

The end of the 1950s was marked by growing debate over the future of Madagascar's relationship with France. Two major political parties emerged. The newly created Democratic Social Party of Madagascar (Parti Social Démocrate de Madagascar – PSD) favoured self-rule while maintaining close ties with France. The PSD was led by Philibert Tsiranana, a well-educated Tsimihety from the northern coastal region who was one of three Malagasy deputies elected in 1956 to the National Assembly in Paris. The PSD built upon Tsiranana's traditional political stronghold of Mahajanga in northwest Madagascar and rapidly extended its sources of support by absorbing most of the smaller parties that had been organised by the côtiers. In sharp contrast, those advocating complete independence from France came together under the auspices of the Congress Party for the Independence of Madagascar (Antokon'ny Kongresy Fanafahana an'i Madagasikara – AKFM). Primarily based in Antananarivo and Antsiranana, party support centred among the Merina under the leadership of Richard Andriamanjato, himself a Merina and a member of the Protestant clergy. To the consternation of French policymakers, the AKFM platform called for nationalisation of foreign-owned industries, collectivisation of land, the "Malagachisation" of society away from French values and customs (most notably use of the French language), international nonalignment, and exit from the Franc Zone.

== Territorial evolution ==
Territorial changes of French Madagascar
Entity	Area (km^{2})	Predecessor entity	Attached	Detached	Successor entity
Madagascar	587,040	Malagasy Protectorate	28 February 1897	26 June 1960	Malagasy Republic
Mayotte	374	Mayotte and Dependencies	25 July 1912	27 October 1946	Territory of the Comoros
Anjouan	424	Mayotte and Dependencies	25 July 1912	27 October 1946	Territory of the Comoros
Grande Comore	1,148	Mayotte and Dependencies	25 July 1912	27 October 1946	Territory of the Comoros
Mohéli	290	Mayotte and Dependencies	25 July 1912	27 October 1946	Territory of the Comoros
Glorioso Islands (Banc du Geyser included)	7	Mayotte and Dependencies	25 July 1912	1 April 1960	Administration subordinated to the Prefect of Réunion
Bassas da India	0.2	Directly administered by the French Ministry of the colonies	October 1897	1 April 1960	Administration subordinated to the Prefect of Réunion
Europa Island	30	Directly administered by the French Ministry of the colonies	October 1897	1 April 1960	Administration subordinated to the Prefect of Réunion
Juan de Nova Island	4.4	Directly administered by the French Ministry of the colonies	October 1897	1 April 1960	Administration subordinated to the Prefect of Réunion
Adélie Land	432,000	Directly administered by the French Ministry of the colonies	21 November 1924	6 August 1955	French Southern and Antarctic Lands
Amsterdam Island	58	Directly administered by the French Ministry of the colonies	21 November 1924	6 August 1955	French Southern and Antarctic Lands
Crozet Islands	352	Directly administered by the French Ministry of the colonies	21 November 1924	6 August 1955	French Southern and Antarctic Lands
Kerguelen Islands	7,215	Directly administered by the French Ministry of the colonies	21 November 1924	6 August 1955	French Southern and Antarctic Lands
Saint Paul Island	8	Directly administered by the French Ministry of the colonies	21 November 1924	6 August 1955	French Southern and Antarctic Lands

== See also ==
- Madagascar
- History of Madagascar
