= Jean Ralaimongo =

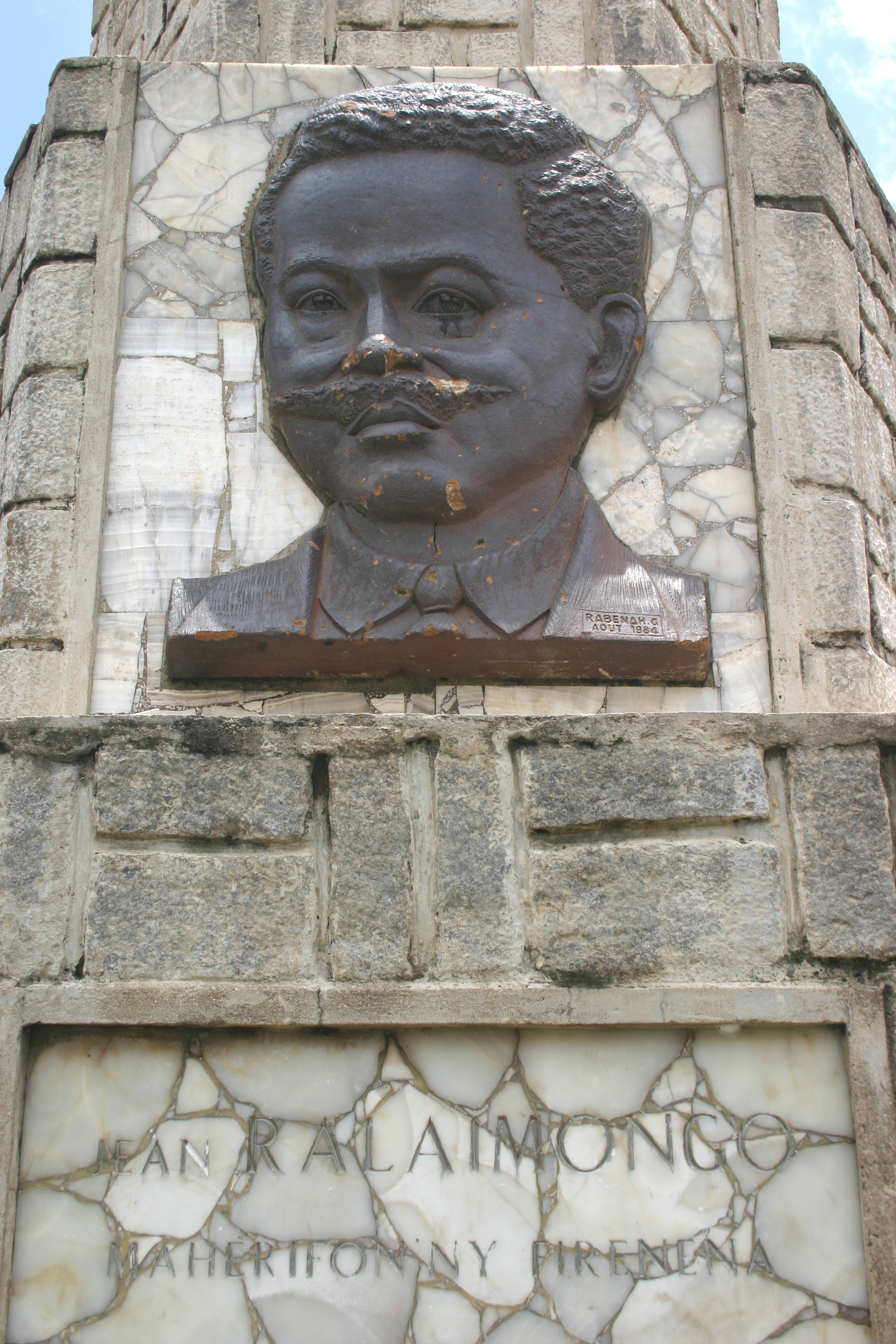
- Jean Ralaimongo's portrait on the side of a column on Avenue de l'indépendance in the capital on Antananarivo
- Born: 1885; Madagascar
- Died: 1944 (aged 58–59)
- Occupations: Teacher, Activist, Politician

Jean Ralaimongo (1885–1944) was a teacher who came to prominence after campaigning to get the French government to give citizenship to the people of Madagascar. Ralaimongo wanted Madagascar to become a French département and therefore part of France. He came to prominence after 3,000 demonstrated following speeches in a cinema in 1929.

== Biography ==
Ralaimongo was born in 1885 to a pastor at one of the missions in Madagascar. This was the same year that a treaty was made between the main ruler of the Island and France. The terms of this treaty would serve as a pretext for France to invade ten years later. Ralaimongo became a teacher and after visiting France in 1910 he, like 40,000 of his fellows, served in the first world war. A fifth of these 40,000 did not return, but those who had shown this allegiance to France may have felt that France may also owe them some allegiance. Ralaimongo wanted to be given the chance to be a Frenchman.

In 1913, the Vy Vato Sakelika was formed. Nominally a cultural organisation, the literal translation of VVS as the iron and steel network gives better clues to its intentions. The authorities convinced by its cell network, sentenced some members to imprisonment in 1916 using tribunal power. These sentences were not removed until November 1922.

As leaders of VVS, both Ralaimongo and D were watched closely, although Ralaimongo's intentions were not at that time militant. He wanted to see On Madagascar become part of France and saw the naturalisation of his fellow citizens as a gradual way forward. However the authorities tried and convicted him of sedition in July 1922. Faced with imprisonment he went to Paris and became involved with journalism. He founded a paper called L'Opinion which together with other newspapers they arrange to have published in their home state.

At the beginning of 1924 Ralaimongo was still in Paris meeting others of a socialist view including his roommate, the future Ho Chi Minh. Ralaimongo returned to Madagascar later that year and became involved with labour relations. A system was introduced by the French to put forward two committees that would be delegates for the people views, but these people had no power. These committees were called Délégations Économiques et Financières and were a victory for Ralaimongo, but the administration led them strongly, arguing with the colonists views and ignoring the Malagasy.

In 1929, 3,000 protesters arose after a meeting at a cinema on 19 May where they heard a speech by Paul Dussac. They gathered around the Governors office in Tananarive where they were armed with sticks and red flags. By the time the next Governor General arrived, Léon Cayla, the police repressions had made heroes of the leaders of the 19 May demonstration. The new General tried to increase the number of applications approved for French citizenship but it was still very low, and far short of the demonstrators demand for mass naturalisation.

Ralaimongo and Joseph Ravoahangy were placed under house arrest in 1930, and not given an amnesty until 1936.

== Afterwards ==
Ralaimongo died in 1944 and it was only at the end of World War II that the French Government allowed some form of democracy. At the end of 1945, two people were elected by the Malagasy to represent them in Paris. These were Joseph Raseta and Joseph Ravoahangy. Both of these were now committed to self-determination for Madagascar.

On 29 March 1947 the French put down an uprising in Madagascar. Estimates of up to 80,000 dead are made, but later estimates put the figure as low as 11,000.

Madagascar gained its independence on 26 June 1960.
