= Vy Vato Sakelika =

Secret society

Vy Vato Sakelika was a nationalist secret society formed in Madagascar in 1913 by Hova Merina elites to inspire rebellion against French colonial rule on the island.

The colonization of the Kingdom of Madagascar in 1896 prompted a popular uprising against the French, termed the Menalamba rebellion. Queen Ranavalona III, her husband and Prime Minister, Rainilaiarivony, and a core group of Hova courtiers were held responsible. Rainandriamampandry (the mayor of Toamasina) and several others were executed by firing squad, while the queen and prime minister were exiled. Members of the Protestant Hova elite, who had collectively formed the country's ruling class, were stripped of their privileges and property. Several other similar uprisings broke out in other parts of the island during the first decade of colonial rule.

The execution and persecution of the Hova elite united this network of powerful Protestant Merina families against the colonial authorities. Protestant Minister Ravelojaona was among the first to publish editorials openly promoting the nationalist ideal; among his earliest and most influential pieces were those published under a series he entitled "Japan and the Japanese" that lauded the successful blending of tradition and modernity in the Meiji period. Shortly after these pieces were published, in July 1913 seven students at the medical school in Antananarivo founded Madagascar's first nationalist organization, the secret society Vy Vato Sakelika (VVS, "Iron, Stone, Network"). The group soon attracted diverse and large membership among the professional class, including Merina office workers, shop employees and primary school teachers. In this way, members of the former Hova elite formed the core membership of the VVS in its early period. Although the group occasionally presented itself as a cultural organization, it used the national press to call on the populace to sacrifice themselves for the freedom and dignity of the tanindrazana (land of their ancestors).

As France entered World War I, these nationalist calls were seen as an affront that could not be tolerated. The French policy toward the VVS hardened in 1915 following a rumor of conspiracy against the state. Several members were arrested and sentenced to forced labor; they were eventually released in 1918 and pardoned in 1922. The colonial authorities cracked down on VVS members. Some were sent to prison on Nosy Lava, a small island off the southwest coast; others were dismissed from government positions or sentenced to hard labor. VVS was outlawed in early 1916 and a newspaper owned by VVS sympathizers was shut down. This harsh response forced into the open the debate about nationalism and equal rights for Malagasy people, leading to the flourishing of a nationalist movement across the island that cut across ethnic, religious and national divides. Many of these united behind Jean Ralaimongo, a former VVS leader who spearheaded the push for equal rights for Malagasy people.

== Bibliography ==
- Boahen, Adu (1990). General History of Africa VII: Africa Under Colonial Domination. Paris: UNESCO. ISBN 9780852550977.
- Ellis, Stephen; Rajaonah, Faranirina (1998). L'insurrection des menalamba: une révolte à Madagascar, 1895-1898 (in French). Paris: Karthala Editions. ISBN 9782865377961.
- Oliver, Roland; Fage, John Donnelly; Sanderson, G.N. (1985). The Cambridge History of Africa. Vol. 6. Cambridge, U.K.: Cambridge University Press. ISBN 978-0-521-22803-9.
- Thomas, Martin (2005). The French Empire Between the Wars: Imperialism, Politics and Society. Manchester, U.K.: Manchester University Press. ISBN 9780719065187.
