= Hova (Madagascar) =

One of three main historic castes in the Merina Kingdom

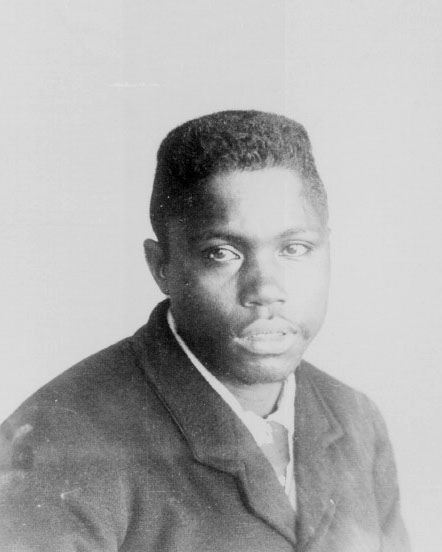
A Hova man, or free commoner, of the Merina people in 1896.

The Hova, or free commoners, were one of the three principal historical castes in the Merina Kingdom of Madagascar, alongside the Andriana (nobles) and Andevo (slaves). The term hova originally applied to all members of a Malagasy clan (possibly of the Zafiraminia people) that migrated into the central highlands from the southeast coast of the island around the 15th century and absorbed the existing population of Vazimba. Andriamanelo (1540–1575) consolidated the power of the Hova when he united many of the Hova chiefdoms around Antananarivo under his rule. The term Hova remained in use through the 20th century, though some foreigners transliterated that word to be Ankova, and increasingly used since the 19th century.

Kotokeli, a Hova boy, Madagascar 1911-1912.

In and after the 16th century, slaves were brought into Madagascar's various kingdoms, and social strata emerged in Merina kingdom. The Hova emerged as the free commoners caste below the nobles hierarchy. The subset of Hova related to the king by blood came under the title Andriana. The social structure of the new kingdom became further defined under his son Ralambo (1575–1612), who further subdivided the Andriana into four ranks. Ralambo was also the first to use the term Imerina (land of the Merina) to describe the land occupied by the Hova people, who thereafter gradually adopted the identity and label of Merina.

The warriors and soldiers of the Merina society were traditionally selected from the Andriana caste, or from the nobles. However, in the 19th century when Merina conquered the other kingdoms and ruled most of the island, a much larger army was needed, and the soldiers then included the Hova caste as well. The traditional occupation of the Hova caste was managing rice and crop lands as owners and trading. The labor in the farms and other servitude was the occupation of the Andevo (slave) caste, also called the Mainty who were denied the right to own land. A Hova person could be reduced to slavery as punishment for crime or a debt in default, and in this state he would be referred to as Zaza-hova.

The Andriana, the Hova and the Andevo strata were endogamous in the Merina society. According to William Ellis memoir in 1838, a Hova in the Malagasy society was prohibited from marrying a noble or a slave, as well as a Zaza-hova. The exception, stated Ellis, was the unmarried Queen who could marry anyone from any strata including the Hova, and her children were deemed to be royal.

== See also ==
- Merina people
