= 2027 Malagasy presidential election =

- September 2027
- Regions of Madagascar since 2023
Incumbent President
Michael Randrianirina
Military

Presidential elections are scheduled to be held in Madagascar in September 2027. The date was set by the Council of the Presidency for the Re-Foundation of the Republic of Madagascar. Until then, Madagascar will be governed by a transitional government led by President Michael Randrianirina.

== Background ==
The 2023 presidential elections were originally scheduled for 9 November 2023, with a potential second round on 20 December, but were postponed to 16 November due to pre-election unrest. Andry Rajoelina was re-elected in the first round with 59% of the vote, while voter turnout was just 46%, the lowest in the country’s presidential election history.

=== Protests ===
On 25 September 2025 protests erupted across Madagascar over widespread power and water outages, especially in the capital, Antananarivo. In response, President Andry Rajoelina dismissed Prime Minister Christian Ntsay, but the move failed to appease the protesters. On the morning of 12 October, Rajoelina reported an attempted power grab by CAPSAT units that had joined the protesters. The alert was triggered after some military personnel were seen leaving their barracks to join the demonstrations. Colonel Michael Randrianirina denied that a coup had occurred, stating that they had merely “answered the people’s calls.”

=== Seizing power ===
As head of CAPSAT, Randrianirina participated in the 2025 coup d'état against Rajoelina during the nationwide protests, urging soldiers “to refuse to repress the population, to take responsibility, and to play their part.” At 13 May Square, he also called on the president, the prime minister, and other officials to resign. On 13 October, CAPSAT declared that it had taken control of all military forces, prompting President Andry Rajoelina to flee the country.

Rajoelina issued a decree dissolving the National Assembly, which had planned to launch impeachment proceedings against him. Despite this, the Assembly went ahead and impeached him with 130 votes in favor and one blank vote. Meanwhile, protests erupted in Antananarivo denouncing Rajoelina as a French stooge because of his dual citizenship and support from Paris. After the vote, Colonel Michael Randrianirina declared that all state institutions were being dissolved, except for the National Assembly. He announced that the following institutions were suspended: the Senate, the High Constitutional Court, the Independent National Electoral Commission, the High Court of Justice, and the High Council for the Defense of Human Rights and the Rule of Law. Addressing nearby protesters, he added, “The constitution is suspended. We will organize a referendum within two years to establish a new democratic order.”

On 14 October, the High Constitutional Court formally tasked him with performing the duties of President of Madagascar as head of the Council of the Presidency for the Re-Foundation of the Republic. The next day, Malagasy state television announced that Randrianirina would be inaugurated on 17 October as “President of the Refoundation of the Republic of Madagascar,” and he was sworn in as planned.

== Election date ==
After taking power on 14 October 2025, Randrianirina pledged elections within two years and announced that a committee of army, paramilitary gendarmerie, and national police officers would govern the nation. In a Sky News interview on 10 November, he stated that elections would be held within 18 to 24 months following a period of “refoundation and recovery,” noting that Generation Z and the wider population were calling for change. On 17 November, he delivered his first national address in a pre-recorded broadcast from the State Palace. Outlining Madagascar’s roadmap, he announced a nationwide consultation led by the Council of Christian Churches in Madagascar to establish a new governance system, followed by a referendum and a presidential election within two years.

=== 24-month transitional plan ===
On 10 December 2025, the National Consultation of Madagascar was officially launched in the capital to discuss constitutional reforms aimed at establishing the country’s Fifth Republic. According to Minister of State for Refoundation Hanitriniaina Razafimanantsoa, the consultation will last six months.

On 28 February 2026, the Council of the Presidency for the Re-Foundation of the Republic of Madagascar released the national Refoundation, outlining a 24-month transition in 2026–2027. The first phase, from March 2026 to January 2027, will hold nationwide consultations to gather citizens’ proposals and ideas on institutional reform. From June 2026 to May 2027, authorities will revise the legal and structural framework to prepare for a constitutional or referendum vote and a presidential election that meets international standards. Between January and April 2027, they will draft the Fifth Republic constitution, which will be submitted to the electorate for approval. A presidential election is scheduled for September 2027. From May to December 2027, the Refoundation will organize the constitutional referendum and the subsequent presidential and territorial elections, depending on the electoral model chosen.

== Candidates ==
=== Declined until further notice ===
The following people were considered potential candidates but have publicly chosen not to run:

- Michael Randrianirina (Military), the incumbent President of Madagascar
  - In an interview with France24 on 5 December 2025, Randrianirina was asked if he would stand for election. He said, “Right now, I am working, and I am not thinking about being a candidate at this time.” Randrianirina delivered his first national address in a pre-recorded broadcast from the State Palace on 17 November. When asked if he would run for president, he said that the decision rests with the people and urged patience, reminding citizens that rebuilding the nation “cannot be done in two months” and requires a collective effort.
