= 2025 Malagasy coup d'état =

2025 military coup in Madagascar

- Part of the 2025 Malagasy protests
Date	12–14 October 2025 (2 days)
Location	Madagascar
Result	Coup d'état successful; Andry Rajoelina flees Madagascar and is impeached by the National Assembly; Removal of Richard Ravalomanana as president of the Senate; Appointment of Michael Randrianirina as interim president within the Council of the Presidency for the Re-Foundation of the Republic of Madagascar; Appointment of CAPSAT nominee Demosthene Pikulas as Armed Forces chief; Madagascar Armed Forces announce a takeover of the government and dissolve numerous political institutions except for the National Assembly

Belligerents
Madagascar Armed Forces (opposition factions); CAPSAT; Youth protesters	Government of Madagascar; Madagascar Armed Forces loyalists; National Gendarmerie; National Police

Commanders and leaders
Michael Randrianirina; Demosthene Pikulas	Andry Rajoelina

On 12 October 2025, CAPSAT, an elite unit of the Madagascar Armed Forces, overthrew the government of President Andry Rajoelina, the culmination of a protest movement which began in late September. The unit urged the rest of the military to join them and the capital Antananarivo was seized with little resistance. Later that day, the president of the Senate was removed and CAPSAT's nominee for chief of the armed forces was accepted by the civilian authorities.

On 13 October, President Andry Rajoelina fled the country under disputed circumstances, and from an undisclosed location, ordered the dissolution of the National Assembly the next day. The legislative body ignored Rajoelina and proceeded to impeach him. Later that day, the military announced that it was taking power and dissolved numerous political institutions except the National Assembly. On 17 October, CAPSAT colonel Michael Randrianirina was inaugurated as interim president.

== Background ==
On 25 September 2025, protests broke out across Madagascar due to power and water outages that have been very common nationwide especially in the capital Antananarivo. To calm the protesters, President Andry Rajoelina dismissed Prime Minister Christian Ntsay; however, this failed to satisfy the protesters.

=== CAPSAT ===
CAPSAT or Administrative and Technical Services Personnel Administration Corps (French: Corps d'administration des personnels et des services administratifs et techniques) is an elite unit of the Madagascar Armed Forces based in the Soanierana district on the outskirts of Antananarivo. It played a major role in the 2009 mutiny which brought Rajoelina to power.

== Coup d'état ==
=== Mutiny ===
On the morning of 12 October 2025, Rajoelina announced an attempt to seize power by the CAPSAT units who joined protesters the previous day. The alert was first raised after a few military personnel were seen leaving the barracks to join the protesters while Prime Minister Ruphin Zafisambo urged calm. A CAPSAT general said one of its soldiers had been shot dead by the gendarmerie during the protests. CAPSAT declared it took control over the armed forces. After CAPSAT's announcement, mutinying soldiers were seen escorting youth protesters to May 13 Square in Antananarivo, where most protests were taking place.

CAPSAT announced the appointment of General Demosthene Pikulas as the new chief of staff of the Malagasy Armed Forces, which was accepted by Armed Forces Minister Manantsoa Deramasinjaka Rakotoarivelo. General Richard Ravalomanana, a close ally of Rajoelina, was removed as president of the Senate, potentially raising the prospects of Rajoelina's own resignation. A CAPSAT commander, Colonel Michael Randrianirina, denied that a coup had taken place, saying that they had only "answered the people's calls". After his appointment, Pikulas said he refused to "discuss politics within a military facility" when asked about demands for Rajoelina's resignation. On 13 October, a unit of the National Gendarmerie that supported the anti-government protests also seized control of the entire gendarmerie at a formal ceremony in the presence of senior government officials.

=== Rajoelina's flight ===
On 12 October, former prime minister Ntsay and one of Rajoelina's advisers, Mamy Ravatomanga, arrived in Mauritius aboard a private flight; the Mauritian government saying that it was "not satisfied" at the arrival. A government spokesperson said Rajoelina is still in the country managing national affairs. He was scheduled to address the nation on the evening of 13 October, but Reuters reported that Rajoelina had left the country on a French military aircraft departing from Sainte Marie Airport in northeastern Madagascar on 12 October after he had made an agreement with French President Emmanuel Macron. However, when he was asked by journalists regarding the situation in Madagascar, Macron, who was attending a summit in Egypt, refused to confirm whether Rajoelina had indeed been evacuated by France and expressed "deep concern" over the situation in Madagascar. Later, Patrice Latron, the Prefect of the French territory of Réunion, located next to Madagascar, denied French forces were preparing to help Rajoelina salvage his presidency.

On 13 October, Rajoelina made a video announcement from the official Facebook page of the Malagasy presidency that he had been evacuated to an undisclosed safe place after an assassination attempt against him by "a group of military personnel and politicians". He urged respect for the constitution, saying that he was "on a mission to find solutions". The address was made after his scheduled message was delayed twice following attempts by the military to seize the state broadcaster. Rajoelina also issued a decree granting pardons to eight people, including French-Malagasy dual national Paul Maillot Rafanoharana, who was sentenced in 2021 to 20 years' imprisonment for a previous coup attempt. The opposition Tiako i Madagasikara (TIM) party announced it would file impeachment proceedings against Rajoelina for "abandonment of post". On 15 October, Rajoelina confirmed that he had left the country sometime between 11 and 12 October after "explicit and extremely serious threats" were made to his life while he was due to travel abroad for a mission.

=== Rajoelina's impeachment ===
On 14 October, Rajoelina issued a decree dissolving the National Assembly that was scheduled to launch impeachment measures against him following consultations with the presidents of the assembly and Senate. This would have allowed for elections to be held in 60 days. However, opposition leader Siteny Randrianasoloniaiko said the decree was "not legally valid" and insisted that Rajoelina had failed to consult the assembly's president, Justin Tokely. Despite Rajoelina's orders, the National Assembly proceeded to impeach him with 130 votes in favor and one blank vote. At the same time, protests were held in Antananarivo denouncing Rajoelina as a French stooge over his dual citizenship and support from Paris. Several protesters carried Malagasy flags and the Straw Hat Pirates' Jolly Roger flag from the manga series One Piece.

Colonel Michael Randrianirina and several CAPSAT soldiers then arrived at Iavoloha Palace, the presidential residence, and announced that the military would form a Council of the Presidency for the Re-Foundation of the Republic of Madagascar—composed of officers from the army and the gendarmerie, and that a prime minister would be appointed to "quickly" form a civilian government. Randrianirina also pledged to hold elections within 18 months to two years and suspended all national political institutions, including the Electoral Commission and the High Constitutional Court (the latter of which had confirmed Randrianirina as president despite protests by Rajoelina's office), as well as the Constitution of Madagascar itself. Only the National Assembly was allowed to continue functioning.

=== New president ===
On 15 October, Malagasy state television announced that Randrianirina would be inaugurated on 17 October as President of Madagascar during a session of the High Constitutional Court. He was inaugurated on that date as planned. During his inaugural speech at the High Constitutional Court, Randrianirina said it marked a "historic turning point" for Madagascar and expressed his determination to "break with the past" and "open a new chapter in the nation's life." Randrianirina thanked the Gen Z protestors. He stated that his first three priorities would be an investigation into the water and power company Jirama, rice farming, and appointing a prime minister and government.

On 20 October, Randrianirina appointed Herintsalama Rajaonarivelo as prime minister. On 25 October, the new government revoked Rajoelina's Malagasy citizenship, citing laws against dual nationality.

== Legal analysis ==
Florent Rakotoarisoa, president of the High Constitutional Court, stated that the transition of power did not violate the 2010 Constitution of Madagascar, although the constitution itself had caused problems. He stated that the transition was not a coup d'état and objected to description of the event as a coup.

== International reactions ==
=== States ===
The African Union urged all parties, both civilian and military, to exercise calm and restraint, and immediately suspended Madagascar. The Southern African Development Community expressed concern, as did the United Nations about the "unconstitutional change of power". The European Union called for the restoration of "democratic values" through a national dialogue.

The United Kingdom advised against all but essential travel to Madagascar as a response to the crisis. The US embassy urged its citizens in Madagascar to shelter-in-place, citing a "highly volatile and unpredictable" situation.

French president Emmanuel Macron expressed "deep concern" over the situation in Madagascar and affirmed "France's friendship with Madagascar people". Macron also asserted that "constitutional order" must be preserved in Madagascar and added "We just need to make sure that it is not taken over by military factions or foreign interference."

=== Others ===
Air France suspended all flights to Madagascar until 17 October; Emirates suspended all flights until further notice.

=== Analysis ===
The ethos, and driving political activism, of Generation Z, the demographic cohort generally taken to have been born between 1997 and 2012, has been of particular note. Political scientist John Joseph Chin compared the Malagasy coup to a "coupvolution", noting its co-occurrence with mass protests, and said it demonstrated that coups in Africa were no longer restricted to the Sahel.

An opinion column published in the Eswatini newspaper Swaziland Times accused that country's monarchy of involvement in the coup, noting the close friendship between King Mswati III and former President Marc Ravalomanana, who was exiled in Eswatini following the 2009 Malagasy political crisis, in which Ravalomanana was overthrown and Rajoelina assumed power.

== See also ==
- Rotaka
- 1990-1992 Movement in Madagascar
- 2002 Malagasy political crisis
- 2009 Malagasy political crisis
