= List of international presidential trips made by Michael Randrianirina =

Presidential trips by Michael Randrianirina

This is a list of international presidential trips made by Michael Randrianirina, President of Madagascar and President of the Council of the Presidency for the Re-Foundation of the Republic of Madagascar since 17 October 2025. Randrianirina has made seven international trips since his presidency began on 17 October 2025.

== Summary ==
The number of visits per country where he has traveled are:

- One: Belgium, Botswana, Egypt, Nigeria, United States
- Two: France, Russia, South Africa, United Arab Emirates

== 2025 ==
	Country	Areas visited	Dates	Details
1	United Arab Emirates	Dubai	9–10 December	Private visit. Held meetings with Emirati, American and Israeli officials, as well as with American businessman Erik Prince. The trip was conducted discreetly for security reasons.

== 2026 ==
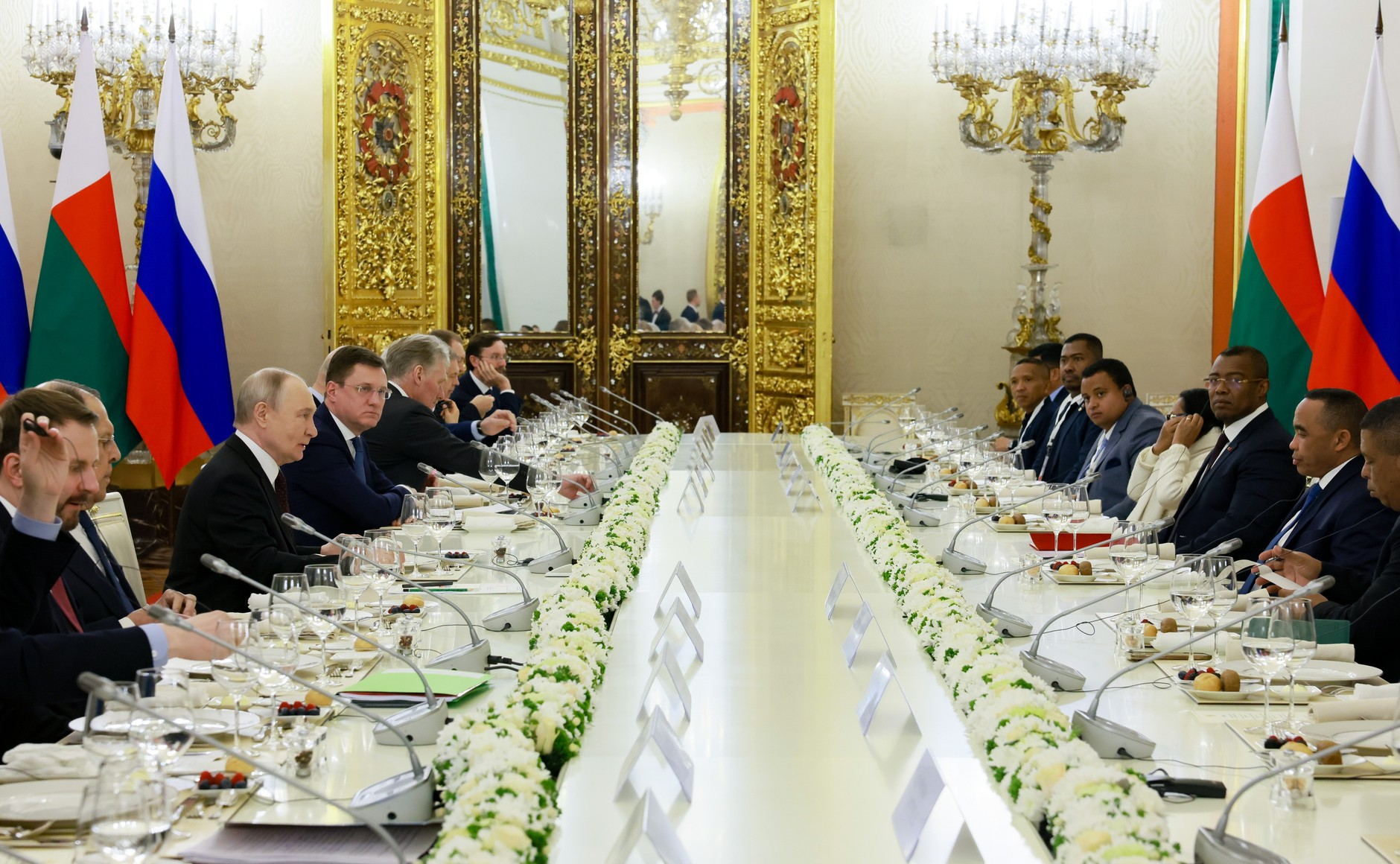
Randrianirina with Russian president Vladimir Putin, 19 February 2026

	Country	Areas visited	Dates	Details
1	United Arab Emirates	Abu Dhabi	13 January	Attended Abu Dhabi Sustainability Week.
2	South Africa	Pretoria	16 January	Working visit. Met with President Cyril Ramaphosa at Mahlamba Ndlopfu.
3	Russia	Moscow	19 February	Official visit. Met with President Vladimir Putin at the Kremlin.
4	France	Paris	24 February	Met with President Emmanuel Macron at the Élysée Palace.
5	Nigeria	Abuja	8 June	Working visit. Met with President Bola Tinubu at the Presidential Villa. The leaders discussed strengthening bilateral relations, trade, economic cooperation, and regional issues.
6	Egypt	New Alamein, Cairo	28–30 July	Official visit. Met with President Abdel Fattah el-Sisi. The two leaders held talks on strengthening bilateral relations in the political, trade, investment, agriculture, healthcare, infrastructure, renewable energy and capacity-building fields. They witnessed the signing of several memorandums of understanding. This was the first official bilateral visit by a Malagasy president to Egypt.
7	South Africa	Durban	15–17 August	Attended the 46th Ordinary Summit of SADC Heads of State and Government. Held a bilateral meeting with President Cyril Ramaphosa.
8	France	Paris	9 September	Attended the International Space Summit. Held talks with President Emmanuel Macron.
9	Belgium	Brussels	10 September	Working visit. Met European Union High Representative Kaja Kallas and Prime Minister Bart De Wever. Topics discussed included infrastructure investment, green energy and electoral support.
10	United States	New York City	22–27 September	Attended the 81st session of the United Nations General Assembly. Met with Senior Advisor for Africa Massad Boulos on 22 September.
11	Botswana	Gaborone	2–3 October	Working visit. Met with President Duma Boko. Boko announced that Botswana would remove visa requirements for Malagasy citizens and proposed cooperation in mining and mineral beneficiation, including sending experts to Madagascar. The two sides gave their technical teams 30 days to renew a 2006 cooperation framework and prepare sectoral agreements. Met with the Malagasy diaspora in Gaborone on 3 October.
12	Russia	Moscow	27–30 October	Attended the third Russia–Africa Summit and delivered a speech in Malagasy at the heads of state roundtable on 29 October. Held talks with President Vladimir Putin at the Kremlin on the sidelines of the summit. Travelled on a plane chartered by the Kremlin.

== See also ==
- Foreign relations of Madagascar
