= Council of the Presidency for the Re-Foundation of the Republic of Madagascar =

Transitional military government

Council of the Presidency for the Re-foundation of the Republic of Madagascar
- Conseil Présidentiel de la Refondation de la République de Madagascar

Overview
- Established: 14 October 2025; 7 months ago
- Country: Madagascar
- Leader: President of the Council of the Presidency for the Re-Foundation of the Republic of Madagascar: Michael Randrianirina
- Headquarters: Antananarivo

The Council of the Presidency for the Re-Foundation of the Republic of Madagascar is the acting governing body of Madagascar and Military junta, established by the Madagascar Armed Forces unit CAPSAT immediately following the 2025 Malagasy coup d'état of 14 October. It is headed by Colonel Michael Randrianirina, who consequently serves as the President of Madagascar. Currently composed of officers from the armed forces and the national gendarmerie, the council’s first decree stated that civilians would likely be included as well.

== Background ==
=== Protests and seizure of power ===
After weeks of protests in Madagascar triggered by frequent power and water outages, the Madagascar Armed Forces, led by CAPSAT, began to disobey orders to quell protesters from then-President Andry Rajoelina and urged other members of the armed forces and the gendarmerie to support the protesters. By the morning of 12 October, CAPSAT partially seized the capital Antananarivo with little resistance and declared the seizure of every Armed Forces chain of commands.

After Antananarivo was partially seized and Rajoelina fled to France, General Demosthene Pikulas was appointed as the new chief of staff of the Madagascar Armed Forces. On 14 October, Iavoloha Palace fell to the armed forces and Colonel Michael Randrianirina was named as the country's interim leader shortly after by the High Constitutional Court and made his first presidential instruction to dissolve all national institutions except the National Assembly. Randrianirina promised an election within two years and said a committee comprising officers from the army, the paramilitary gendarmerie, and the national police would govern the nation. Addressing reporters and the protesters gathered nearby, he said: “The constitution is suspended. We will organize a referendum within two years to establish a new democratic order.”

On 15 October, Malagasy state television announced that Randrianirina would be inaugurated on 17 October as "President of the Refoundation of the Republic of Madagascar" during a session of the Constitutional Court. He was sworn in on that date as planned.

=== Leadership ===
On 20 October 2025, Randrianirina appointed businessman Herintsalama Rajaonarivelo as the nation's prime minister, succeeding general Ruphin Zafisambo. On 25 October, the new government revoked Rajoelina's Malagasy citizenship, citing laws against dual nationality. In an interview with Sky News on 10 November, he promised elections within 18 to 24 months following a period of “refoundation and recovery,” saying that Generation Z and the broader population wanted change. On 9 March 2026, Randrianirina dismissed several cabinet members and Prime Minister Rajaonarivelo. On 15 March 2026, he appointed Mamitiana Rajaonarison as Prime Minister.

=== 24-month transitional plan ===
On 10 December 2025, the National Consultation of Madagascar was officially launched in the capital to discuss constitutional reforms aimed at establishing the country’s Fifth Republic. According to Minister of State for Refoundation Hanitriniaina Razafimanantsoa, the consultation will last six months.

On 28 February 2026, the Council of the Presidency for the Re-Foundation of the Republic of Madagascar released the national Refoundation, outlining a 24-month transition in 2026–2027. The first phase, from March 2026 to January 2027, will hold nationwide consultations to gather citizens’ proposals and ideas on institutional reform. From June 2026 to May 2027, authorities will revise the legal and structural framework to prepare for a constitutional or referendum vote and a presidential election that meets international standards. Between January and April 2027, they will draft the Fifth Republic constitution, which will be submitted to the electorate for approval. A presidential election is scheduled for September 2027. From May to December 2027, the Refoundation will organize the constitutional referendum and the subsequent presidential and territorial elections, depending on the electoral model chosen.
