= Cabinet of Madagascar =

The Cabinet of Madagascar is the executive in the Government of Madagascar.

== List ==
- Andrianarivo government
- Mahafaly government
- Ntsay government
- First Rabemananjara government
- Second Rabemananjara government
- Third Rabemananjara government
- Sulla government
- Zafisambo government
- Council of the Presidency for the Re-Foundation of the Republic of Madagascar
  - Zafisambo government (from 14 October 2025 on)
  - Rajaonarivelo government
  - Rajaonarison government
