= Michael Randrianirina =

President of Madagascar since 2025

His Excellency Colonel Michael Randrianirina
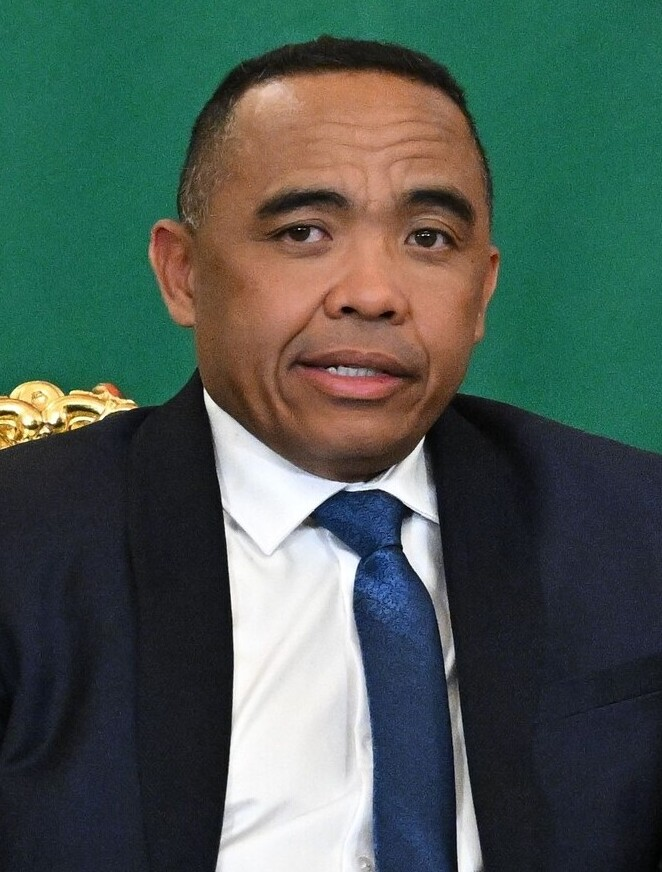
- Randrianirina in 2026

President of Madagascar
- Incumbent
- Assumed office 17 October 2025 (Note: Before becoming president, Randrianirina was formally asked by the High Constitutional Court on 14 October 2025 to perform the duties of the President of Madagascar as President of the President of the Council of the Presidency for the Re-Foundation of the Republic of Madagascar and was sworn in on 17 October 2025)
- Prime Minister: See list: Ruphin Zafisambo; Herintsalama Rajaonarivelo; Mamitiana Rajaonarison
- Preceded by: Andry Rajoelina

Governor of Androy
- In office c. 2016–c. 2018
- Preceded by: Unknown
- Succeeded by: Soja Tsimandilatse Lahimaro (2019)

Personal details
- Born: 1974 (age 51–52) Sevohipoty, Androy, Madagascar
- Spouse: Marisoa Elisa Berthine

Military service
- Allegiance: Madagascar
- Branch/service: Madagascar Armed Forces
- Rank: Colonel

Michael Randrianirina (born 1974) is a Malagasy military officer and politician who has served as President of Madagascar since 2025. He also chairs the Council of the Presidency for the Re-Foundation of the Republic of Madagascar.

Born in the village of Sevohipoty in Madagascar’s Androy region at the southern tip of the Indian Ocean, he came to power after being imprisoned and later joining protests against the previous administration. He previously served as Governor of Androy from 2016 to 2018 and later became a senior military commander and head of the CAPSAT unit. Randrianirina gradually emerged as a vocal critic of President Andry Rajoelina. In November 2023, he was quickly arrested for mutiny and accused of instigating a military revolt and attempting a coup d'état. He was brought before a court and immediately detained at Tsiafahy prison. In February 2024, he was released after receiving a suspended sentence for offenses against state security and later returned to CAPSAT.

In October 2025, as head of CAPSAT, Randrianirina joined the coup d'état against Rajoelina amid the 2025 Malagasy protests. CAPSAT overthrew Rajoelina, who fled the country, and Randrianirina was inaugurated as President of Madagascar on 17 October, after being confirmed by the High Constitutional Court, although he denied that his leadership resulted from a coup. As president, he stated that Madagascar intends to pursue BRICS membership. On his first trip abroad outside Africa, he met with Russian President Vladimir Putin. He also promised to hold elections within 18–24 months. He announced a nationwide consultation led by the Council of Christian Churches in Madagascar to establish a new governance system and pledged the creation of a Youth Assembly.

== Early life, political and military career ==
Micheal Randrianirina was born in 1974 in the village of Sevohipoty, located in Madagascar’s Androy region at the southern tip of the Indian Ocean. His exact birth date and family background are unknown.

Randrianirina received his military training at the Antsirabe Military Academy. Randrianirina was Governor of the Androy region between 2016 and 2018, during the presidency of Hery Rajaonarimampianina. He then served as an infantry battalion commander in Toliara until July 2022. He later became head of the elite CAPSAT unit.

=== 2023 arrest ===
Randrianirina gradually became a vocal critic of President Andry Rajoelina. He was "hastily arrested" for mutiny on 27 November 2023 and charged with "instigating a military mutiny and attempting a coup d'état". On the same day, he was both put before court and immediately sent to Tsiafahy prison. He was released in February 2024, after being given a suspended sentence for attacking state security, and returned to CAPSAT.

== 2025 political crisis ==
On 25 September 2025, protests broke out across Madagascar due to power and water outages that have become very common nationwide, especially in the capital Antananarivo. To calm the protesters, President Andry Rajoelina dismissed Prime Minister Christian Ntsay; however, this failed to satisfy the protesters.

=== Coup d'état ===
On the morning of 12 October 2025, President Andry Rajoelina announced an attempt to seize power by the CAPSAT units who joined protesters. The alert was first raised after a few military personnel were seen leaving the barracks to join the protesters. Randrianirina denied that a coup had taken place, saying that they had only "answered the people's calls".

On 12 October, former prime minister Christian Ntsay and one of Rajoelina's advisers, Mamy Ravatomanga, arrived in Mauritius aboard a private flight the Mauritian government saying that it was "not satisfied" at the arrival. A government spokesperson said Rajoelina is still in the country managing national affairs. He was scheduled to address the nation on the evening of 13 October, but Reuters reported that Rajoelina had left the country on a French military aircraft departing from Sainte Marie Airport in northeastern Madagascar on 12 October after he had made an agreement with French President Emmanuel Macron. On 13 October, Rajoelina made a video announcement from the official Facebook page of the Malagasy presidency that he had been evacuated to an undisclosed safe place after an assassination attempt against him by "a group of military personnel and politicians". On 13 October, CAPSAT declared that it had taken control of all military forces, prompting President Andry Rajoelina to flee the country. On 14 October, Rajoelina issued a decree dissolving the National Assembly that was scheduled to launch impeachment measures against him following consultations with the presidents of the assembly and Senate. This would have allowed for elections to be held in 60 days. Despite Rajoelina's orders, the National Assembly proceeded to impeach him with 130 votes in favor and one blank vote.

While head of CAPSAT, Randrianirina joined the 2025 Malagasy mutiny against incumbent president Andry Rajoelina amidst the 2025 Malagasy protests, calling on soldiers "to refuse to repress the population, to take responsibility, and to play their part". On 13 May Square, Randrianirina called on the president and prime minister to resign, among others.

== Presidency (2025–present) ==
=== Seizing power ===
Presidential styles of Micheal Randrianirina
- Reference style: His Excellency
- Spoken style: President of the Re-Foundation of the Republic of Madagascar
- Alternative style: Mr. President

On 14 October, Randrianirina and several CAPSAT soldiers then arrived at Iavoloha Palace, the presidential residence, and announced that the military would form a Council of the Presidency for the Re-Foundation of the Republic of Madagascar—composed of officers from the army and the gendarmerie, and that a prime minister would be appointed to "quickly" form a civilian government. Randrianirina also pledged to hold elections within 18 months to two years and suspended all national political institutions, including the Electoral Commission and the High Constitutional Court, as well as the Constitution of Madagascar itself. Only the National Assembly was allowed to continue functioning. On that day, he was formally asked by the High Constitutional Court to carry out the duties of the President of Madagascar as President of the Council of the Presidency for the Re-Foundation of the Republic.

On 15 October, Malagasy state television announced that Randrianirina would be inaugurated on 17 October as "President of the Refoundation of the Republic of Madagascar" during a session of the Constitutional Court. He was sworn in on that date as planned. During his inaugural speech at the High Constitutional Court, Randrianirina said it marked a "historic turning point" for Madagascar and expressed his determination to "break with the past" and "open a new chapter in the nation's life." Randrianirina thanked the Gen Z protestors. He stated that his first three priorities would be an investigation into the water and power company Jirama, rice farming, and appointing a prime minister and government.

=== Administration ===
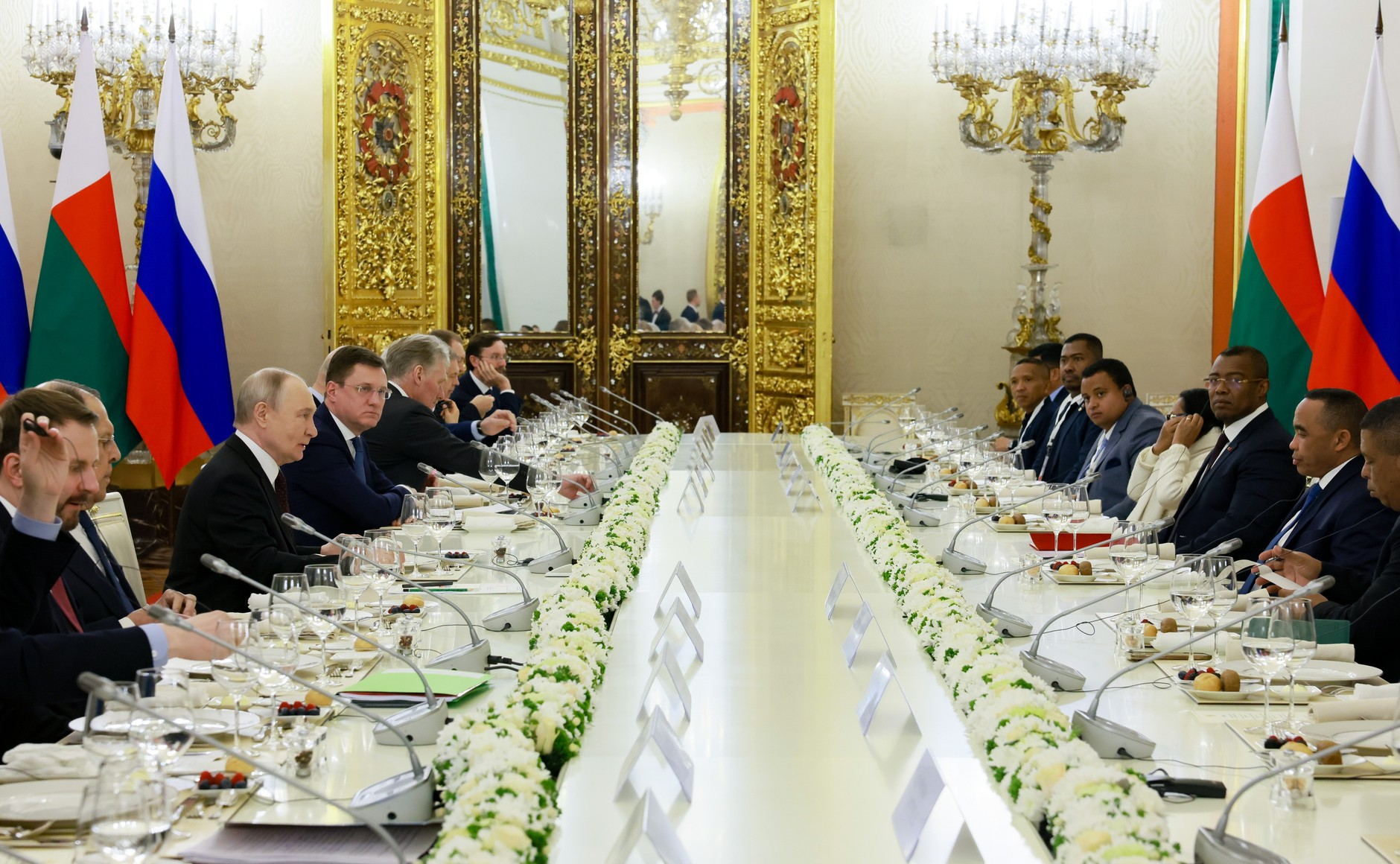
Randrianirina with Russian president Vladimir Putin, 19 February 2026

On 20 October 2025, Randrianirina appointed businessman Herintsalama Rajaonarivelo as the nation's prime minister, succeeding general Ruphin Zafisambo.

In an interview with Sky News on 10 November, Randrianirina said it was an honour to serve in the palace and help Malagasy people living in poverty. He stressed that he is both a military officer and part of the people, and denied that his leadership was the result of a coup, claiming that President Andry Rajoelina chose to leave the country. He promised elections within 18 to 24 months after a period of “refoundation and recovery,” saying that Generation Z and the broader population wanted change. He added that if the people no longer supported him, he would step down.

On 17 November, Randrianirina delivered his first national address. Speaking in a pre-recorded televised conversation from the State Palace, he rejected claims that the fall of his predecessor, Andry Rajoelina, was a coup, insisting that no violence had occurred. Responding to accusations of judicial revenge, he said that the investigations are a matter of justice, not vengeance, and vowed to pursue those who plundered the country. Outlining Madagascar’s roadmap, he announced a nationwide consultation led by the influential Council of Christian Churches in Madagascar to establish a new governance system, followed by a referendum and a presidential election within two years. He also promised the creation of a Youth Assembly and a stronger focus on the Malagasy language and history in schools. When asked if he would run for president, Randrianirina said the decision belongs to the people and urged patience, reminding citizens that rebuilding the nation “cannot be done in two months” and requires a collective effort.

On 12 February 2026, Randrianirina visited Toamasina to assess the damage caused by Cyclone Gezani. He described the destruction as overwhelming, stating that much of Toamasina had been destroyed and appealing for international assistance. On 9 March, Randrianirina dismissed several cabinet members and Prime Minister Rajaonarivelo. On 15 March, he appointed Mamitiana Rajaonarison as Prime Minister. On 20 March, Randrianirina said that becoming a minister in Madagascar’s new government would require candidates to undergo lie detector tests to root out corruption. He added, "After taking the polygraph test, candidates who fail will not proceed to an interview. Those who pass the polygraph test will have an interview with me and the prime minister."

=== Foreign relations ===
In January 2026, during a meeting between Randrianirina and South African president Cyril Ramaphosa, Randrianirina said that his country intends to pursue becoming a BRICS partner. On 19 February, Randrianirina met with Russian President Vladimir Putin at the Kremlin to discuss the current state and future prospects of Russian–Malagasy cooperation across various sectors, as well as key international and regional issues. This marked his first trip abroad outside of Africa. On 24 February, Randrianirina met with Emmanuel Macron at the Élysée Palace. On the same day, the World Bank Group Paris Office received Randrianirina for a high-level roundtable on Madagascar’s development prospects, convened by Éléonore Caroit, France’s Minister Delegate for Francophonie, International Partnerships, and French Nationals Abroad.

== Personal life ==
Randrianirina is from Sevohipoty, a village located southeast of Ambovombe Androy. He is a member of the Malagasy Lutheran Church. He is married to Elisa Randrianirina (Marisoa Elisa Berthine).

== Notes ==
Political offices
Preceded by Andry Rajoelina	President of Madagascar; President of the Council of the Presidency of the Republic for Reform; 2025–present	Incumbent
