= 2025 Malagasy protests =

Political protests in Madagascar leading to regime change in 2025

- Part of the Gen Z protests
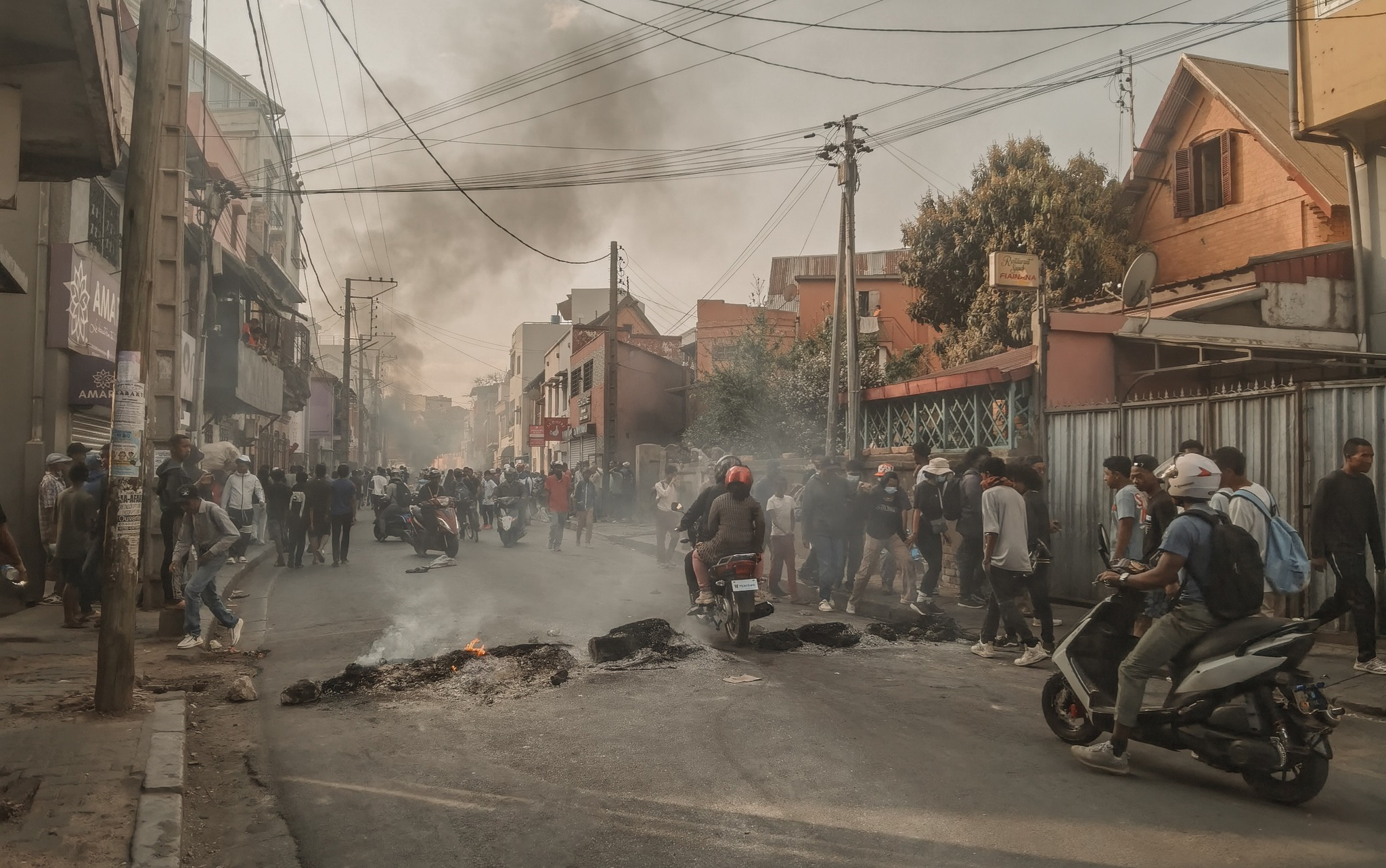
- Date: 25 September – 14 October 2025
- Location: Madagascar
- Caused by: Power and water cuts in Antananarivo; Corruption; Declining living standards
- Goals: Governmental accountability and transparency; Resignation of president Andry Rajoelina
- Methods: Demonstrations; Student activism; Internet activism; General strike; Riots; Arson
- Result: Protests fail to restore democracy but succeed in regime change: Damage to aerial tramway facilities, commercial areas and supermarkets; Looting of politicians' homes; 2025 Malagasy coup d'état; Rajoelina flees the country; Rajoelina impeached and removed from office
- Concessions: Dissolution of the Ntsay government Formation of the Zafisambo government

Parties
Anti-government protestors: Madagascar Armed Forces (pro-opposition factions); CAPSAT (From 11 October 2025)	Government of Madagascar; Madagascar Armed Forces loyalists; National Gendarmerie; National Police; Young Malagasies Determined; Pro-Rajoelina groups; Ravatomanga's militia; Looters

Lead figures
No centralized leadership	Andry Rajoelina; Christian Ntsay; Mamy Ravatomanga; Jean Herbert Andriantahiana Rakotomalala; Richard Ravalomanana; Angelo Ravelonarivo

Casualties and losses
22 killed, 100+ injured (Note: Including non-protesters and those killed by rioters and looters.)	Unknown

The 2025 Malagasy protests were decentralized, Gen Z–led protests across Madagascar from September to October 2025, culminating in a coup d'état by the CAPSAT unit, which overthrew sitting President Andry Rajoelina and led to the establishment of the Council of the Presidency for the Re-Foundation of the Republic. The protests were triggered by frequent water and power outages in the capital city Antananarivo, and spread across Madagascar. At least 22 people, including protesters and civilians, were killed due to the security forces' response and the violence involved in looting and general disorder.

Rajoelina initially responded by removing the Minister for Energy on 26 September, and then announced the dissolution of the government of Prime Minister Christian Ntsay on 29 September. On 6 October 2025, Rajoelina appointed military general Ruphin Zafisambo as the new Prime Minister. On 11 October, units of the Madagascar Armed Forces carried out a coup d'état in support of the protests. Rajoelina, who held French citizenship, fled the country with apparent assistance from the French Air Force.

== Background ==
Madagascar is located off the coast of East Africa in the Indian Ocean. The World Bank estimated that in 2022, out of a country of 30 million 75% of the population lived below the poverty line. Incumbent Rajoelina, who had dominated the country's politics since its 2009 political crisis, and was re-elected in 2023 in an opposition boycotted vote, had been blamed for much of the country's recent economic woes.

While the capital of Antananarivo had regularly seen widespread power outages and water cuts that lasted for up to 12 hours at a time, the government would invest in high-profile projects, such as a $152 million cable car in Antananarivo spanning 13 kilometers. Rajoelina defended the project, using the early criticisms of the Eiffel Tower as a justification.

Rajoelina, also a citizen of France, had become a focal point of public resentment due to his family's visible wealth and privileges. His daughter Ilona Rajoelina was often seen wearing designer brands, while his son Arena Rajoelina reportedly attended the expensive EHL hospitality school in Lausanne, Switzerland. Viral TikTok videos by local influencers such as GasyBaddhie and BasedMerina denounced the president’s luxurious lifestyle, drawing parallels to international examples such as Shrinkhala Khatiwada, former Miss Nepal and daughter of an ex-health minister, whose activities had sparked public backlash.

== Origin ==
The protests were rooted in historical grievances but triggered by a cascade of smaller protests leading to further unrest. On 15 September 2025, Transparency International helped organize a small rally known as Democrasia Mainty in Ambohijatovo, Antananarivo.

On 18 September 2025, politicians Clémence Raharinirina and Baba Faniry Rakotoarisoa publicly called for mass protests in front of the Senate in Anosy to denounce chronic power outages, water cuts, and systemic corruption in public utilities. Their movement was named Tsy Manaiky Lembenana ("We Refuse to Be Trampled") and Leo Delestage ("Fed up with load shedding").

Following this, a Facebook page named Gen Z Madagascar emerged as the primary organizing hub for the movement, rapidly gaining over 100,000 followers in five days. Its logo draws inspiration from the manga One Piece, replacing the traditional straw hat with a Malagasy-style hat.

== Timeline ==
On September 24, 2025, Rajoelina and his delegation were in New York City for the 80th session of the United Nations General Assembly where he delivered a speech. Although some local governments banned protests on the grounds that they could lead to greater unrest, demonstrations took place in the capital, Antananarivo, as well as in provincial towns such as Toamasina, Antsirabe, Toliara, and Antsiranana on September 25, 2025. A large gendarmerie unit was seen in the early hours in the capital, cordoning off certain areas to protestors.

=== 25 September ===
Thousands of young people attempted to gather at Ambohijatovo, historically designated as the "Place of Democracy" by Rajoelina himself 2009. Police blocked all access points, preventing assembly. Protesters then tried to reach the square from multiple neighborhoods, including Antsahabe, Faravohitra, Anosy, and Ambatonakanga, but each route was met with heavy police presence with tear gas bombs and rubber bullets. Despite these obstacles, the city saw widespread marches of students chanting slogans such as "Mitsangana ry Tanora" (a nationalist rally song) and "Andry Rajoelina Masosopory," a parody of Rajoelina's election campaign song in 2018. From the second week, the "Miala pory Rajoelina (Step down, Rajoelina)" song was called by some "the official hymn of the protest". Protestors flew Malagasy flags as well as flags featuring the Straw Hat Jolly Roger from the One Piece franchise.

At 10:45 a.m. (UTC+3), the first shots of tear gas were used by police, led by Colonel Tojo Raoilijon. Police used tear gas and rubber bullets throughout the day. Protestors set up barricades and burned tires and rocks. Three homes of politicians close to Rajoelina were set ablaze by rioters, including the house of Senator Lalatiana Rakotondrazafy and MP Naivo Raholdina. Looting at various retail, bank, and appliance establishments in Antananarivo began to take place in the afternoon, beginning in Anosibe with the burning of a train station. Looters set ablaze a hotel, a bank, and stations of the country's cable car system. According to a hospital source, five people died, all bearing AK-47 gunfire wounds, and an unknown number were injured. Outside of the city, the offices of Jirama, the national electricity and water provider, were attacked by protestors. The rally in Antsirabe and Toamasina also devolved into looting and vandalism.

Antananarivo police prefect Angelo Ravelonarivo announced a curfew lasting from 7 p.m. (UTC+3), to 5 a.m. the next day. Despite the protests initially dispersing, they spread into various parts of the capital. National Police chief Danny Marius Rakotoarimanana warned that authorities would "take firm preventive...measures against those tempted to break the law."

=== 26 September ===
In Antsirabe, protesters gathered at the city's train station at around 10 a.m. (UTC+3) before being dispersed with tear gas by police. By noon, looting had begun to occur against commercial buildings in the city, with limited police presence since most officers had been redeployed to Antananarivo. Around 4 p.m., the death of Jean-Jacques Rabenirinia, the member of parliament for Betioky from the opposition group Firaisankina and Dean of the National Assembly, was announced, after he succumbed to his injuries from an accident. His vehicle had been struck by a truck at a barricade erected by protesters.

During his address starting at 7:30p.m., live from New York City (where he was attending the United Nations General Assembly), Rajoelina announced the dismissal of Jean-Baptiste Olivier, the Minister of Energy and Hydrocarbons, under the pretext that he "was not doing his job". Rajoelina further condemned the violence which occurred after the protests as "acts of destabilization" and accused opposition politicians of taking advantage of the protests in an attempt to orchestrate a coup.

Six people, including a university student, were reportedly killed in clashes with police across Antsiranana. Thirty people were also injured.

=== 27 September ===
Protesters continued to gather in Antananarivo, with some wearing colored straw hats as a symbol of resistance. Rajoelina returned from New York, and summoned a meeting of military and police commanders to deploy military and security forces to secure fuel stations and storage, along with commercial areas.

Student-led gatherings were organized in six major cities across Madagascar, with protesters complaining of difficult living conditions and demanding equitable study conditions, specifically calling for the same opportunities as the children of Malagasy leaders who study abroad. In Antananarivo, security forces pushed back the protesters using AK-47s and tear gas all along General Charles-de-Gaulle Avenue in Tsiadana, up to the Ankatso campus of the University of Antananarivo. This crackdown sparked additional outrage due to the presence, along this avenue, of the Mpitsabo Mikambanana 24/24 private hospital, one of the most prestigious medical institutions in the country.

Curfews ranging from 7/8 p.m. to 4/5 a.m. were announced outside Antananarivo, Mahajanga, Toamasina, Antsirabe and Toliara.

=== 29 September ===
Student associations called for a general mobilization, and demanded the release of protesters arrested on 27 September on top of their initial denouncement of the water and electricity cuts. As the group of students marched from the University of Antananarivo campus towards the Ambohijatovo neighborhood, they were blocked by security forces who attempted to disperse and push back the protesters with tear gas. Protesters also began demanding the resignation of Rajoelina.

As protests continued, Rajoelina announced that he would dissolve the government (under Prime Minister Christian Ntsay), and provided a three-day period for choosing a new prime minister. MP Antoine Rajerison was arrested by security forces. The curfew in Antananarivo was adjusted to be from 8 p.m. to 4 a.m.

According to the Office of the United Nations High Commissioner for Human Rights, 22 people had been killed and 100 injured throughout the course of the protests, including both those killed by security forces and those killed in the looting and general violence by looters and gangs. The Malagasy Ministry of Foreign Affairs rejected this figure.

=== 30 September ===
Protesters called for another rally to be held in Antananarivo starting on 11 a.m. EAT. Thousands of protesters gathered in Antananarivo's Ambohijatovo Square, with some protesters having travelled from provincial towns to join the protest. In one incident, Senate President Richard Ravalomanana's car was accosted by protesters, which led him to disembark from his vehicle and pursue the protesters on foot. There were also reports of violence against journalists including Mendrika Razafindratsima and Leonardjo Andriamparany, brutalized by GSIS forces in the afternoon in Ambohijatovo.

=== 1 October ===
Protests spread to other cities and towns, including Toliara, some 925 kilometres (575 mi) south of Antananarivo. The government accused the demonstrators of vandalism and of promoting a coup d'état. Opposition leader Rivo Rakotovao announced that his party and allies would not join any government under the leadership of Rajoelina and asked him to step down.

Labour unions began joining protests, and calls were made for a general strike. Protests on 1 October were relatively contained by police forces, and violence was much lower than in the previous days. Rajoelina met with foreign diplomats at the presidential palace on 1 October, and presidential spokesperson Lova Ranoromaro claimed that protesters had largely dispersed "without a clear leader emerging". Pro-Rajoelina groups began announcing that they would hold counter-protests.

=== 5 October ===
Counter-protesters only numbered in the hundreds.

=== 6 October ===
A close advisor to the president, businessman Mamy Ravatomanga has been vilified since the start of the protests for his control over the Malagasy economy and politics, his close ties to President Rajoelina, and his involvement in the repression of the population through a private security company belonging to his conglomerate, which some have described as a militia.

In a televised address on October 6, 2025, he rejected all the accusations, stating that all legal proceedings against him had been dropped.

=== 7 October ===
Police used tear gas on hundreds of protesters. A march was stopped by a barricade. One man was hospitalized. The United Nations criticized the police and the usage of live ammunition.

=== 8 October ===
Rajoelina offered talks, but the protesters rejected them as long as protests were being suppressed. Rajoelina called the protests a coup.

=== 9 October ===
Stun grenades, tear gas and rubber bullets were used on protesters.

=== 12 October ===
A contingent of the Malagasy military (CAPSAT) mutinied and called for the military to back and protect the protestors, encountering little resistance as it took control of central Antananarivo.

=== 13 October ===
CAPSAT announced it had seized control of all military forces. Rajoelina fled the country.

=== 14 October ===
Rajoelina issued a decree dissolving the National Assembly that was scheduled to launch impeachment measures against him. Despite this, the National Assembly proceeded to impeach him with 130 votes in favor and one blank vote. At the same time, protests were held in Antananarivo denouncing Rajoelina as a French stooge due to his dual citizenship and support from Paris. Several protesters carried Malagasy flags and the Straw Hat Pirates' Jolly Roger flag from the manga series One Piece. After the vote, Colonel Michael Randrianirina declared that all state institutions were being dissolved, except for the National Assembly.

=== 17 October ===
Colonel Michael Randrianirina was inaugurated as interim president.

=== 20 October ===
President Michael Randrianirina appointed businessman Herintsalama Rajaonarivelo to be his prime minister, however this action was met with criticism from Gen Z Mada, who claimed that it was done in a "non-transparent" manner and "without consultation". The opposition to the appointment stemmed from the questionable connection Rajaonarivelo had with the previous administration.

== Reactions ==
The Council of Christian Churches in Madagascar (FFKM) issued a statement calling for an end to violence, looting, and destruction of property, while also noting that "the population must enjoy its most basic rights, those of having electricity and drinking water". African Union Chairperson Mahamoud Ali Youssouf called for restraint and calm. Pope Leo XIV released a statement decrying violence and asking for social harmony, the promotion of justice and the common good.

Reporters Without Borders denounced "police violence against at least three journalists" on 25 September, and Amnesty International condemned the "unlawful and excessive force used by state security officials" and called for investigations into the deaths. The United Nations secretary general expressed sadness at the violence.

On 13 October 2025, French president Emmanuel Macron expressed concern over the political crisis in Madagascar, emphasizing the need to respect the constitutional order and institutional continuity, supporting the actions of the African Union and SADC, and warning against any use of youth for political or military purposes. He commented on reports that President Andry Rajoelina had boarded a French military plane to Réunion before leaving for another destination with his family, stating, "I cannot confirm anything today," while speaking to the press from Sharm El-Sheikh, Egypt, during a summit on the Gaza peace agreement.

== Impact ==
On 26 September, school officials in Antananarivo announced that schools in the city would be closed until order was restored. In much of the city, schools were closed early on 25 September when tear gas began to seep into the schools. Gas stations were also closed in Antananarivo after a surge of panic buying by drivers. Supermarkets and modern retail stores were also closed in fear of looters for several days, resulting in shortages of packaged products such as diapers and bottled water. Losses due to looting at retail stores were projected in the billions of ariary. Local newspaper Midi Madagasikara warned of potential mass layoffs due to losses caused by the looting.

A large number of flights to and from Antananarivo's Ivato International Airport were cancelled, leaving many international tourists stranded. Air France suspended flights between Paris and Antananarivo from October 11 to October 13, inclusive.

== See also ==
- Asian Spring – 2020s protests and revolutions
- Gen Z protests – Worldwide protests by Generation Z individuals
- Rotaka
- 1990-1992 Movement in Madagascar
- 2002 Malagasy political crisis
- 2009 Malagasy political crisis
