= Straw Hats' Jolly Roger =

Fictional flag

Straw Hats' Jolly Roger 麦わらの一味の海賊旗

The Straw Hats' Jolly Roger (Japanese: 麦わらの一味の海賊旗, Hepburn: Mugiwara no Ichimi no Kaizokuki; lit. Straw Hat Crew's Jolly Roger), also known as the Straw Hats' Skull and Crossbones, is a pirate flag predominantly featured in the Japanese One Piece manga and its anime franchise, wherein it is used to identify the protagonist Straw Hats, a pirate crew who often fight for liberation of oppressed peoples. The fictional Jolly Roger is of a cartoonish skull with two crossbones and a straw hat similar to the one worn by Monkey D. Luffy.

The Straw Hats' Jolly Roger is a symbol for several global youth-led protest movements. In the August 2025 Indonesian protests, people began using the flag instead of the national flag as a form of protest against the government, and the practice spread to other countries. Notably, the flag saw widespread use during protests in Nepal and Madagascar which overthrew their respective governments. The flag has also seen use in protests in other countries across Africa, the Americas, and Eurasia.

== Fictional background ==
In Eiichiro Oda's One Piece series, each pirate crew has its own distinct Jolly Roger that reflects its traits and beliefs. Although the flag was originally drawn by the main series protagonist Monkey D. Luffy, his poor sketch led one of his crewmates Usopp to redesign it. One Piece itself is one of the longest-running and most popular Japanese media franchises, its manga (beginning publication in 1997) being the best-selling of all time and its anime running since 1999.

The flag's anti-authoritarian usage is a reference to a major storyline involving the fictional world government, which controls most of the story's locations, and the Straw Hat Pirates' struggles to fight back, while concurrently hunting for the titular treasure. As described by CNN, "the flag symbolizes Luffy's quest to chase his dreams, liberate oppressed people, and fight the autocratic World Government". Multiple academic works have analysed how the manga draws parallels to real world politics and authoritarianism.

== Use as a political symbol ==
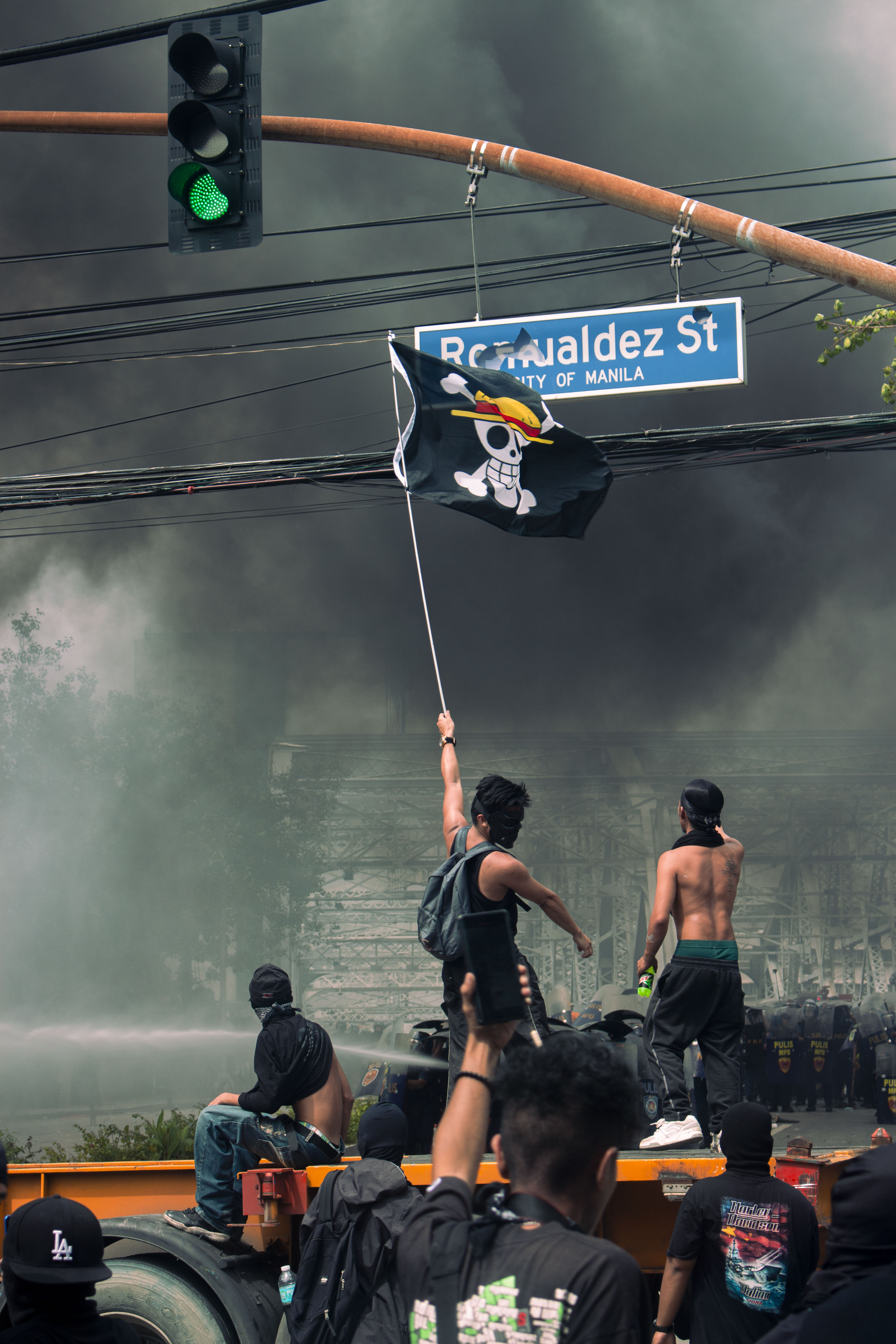
Protesters with the flag in Manila

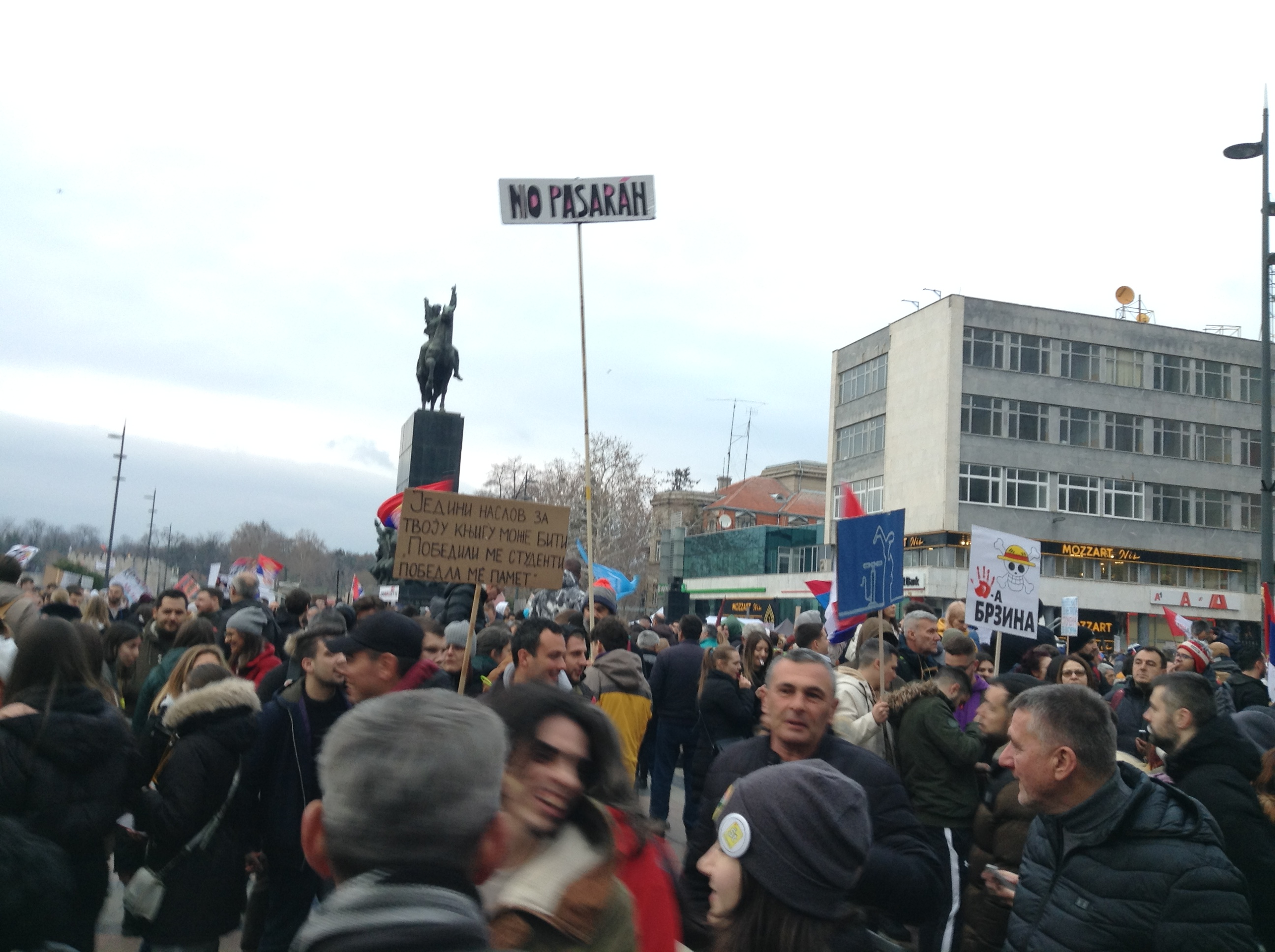
Protesters in Niš. A sign with the symbol can be seen to the right.

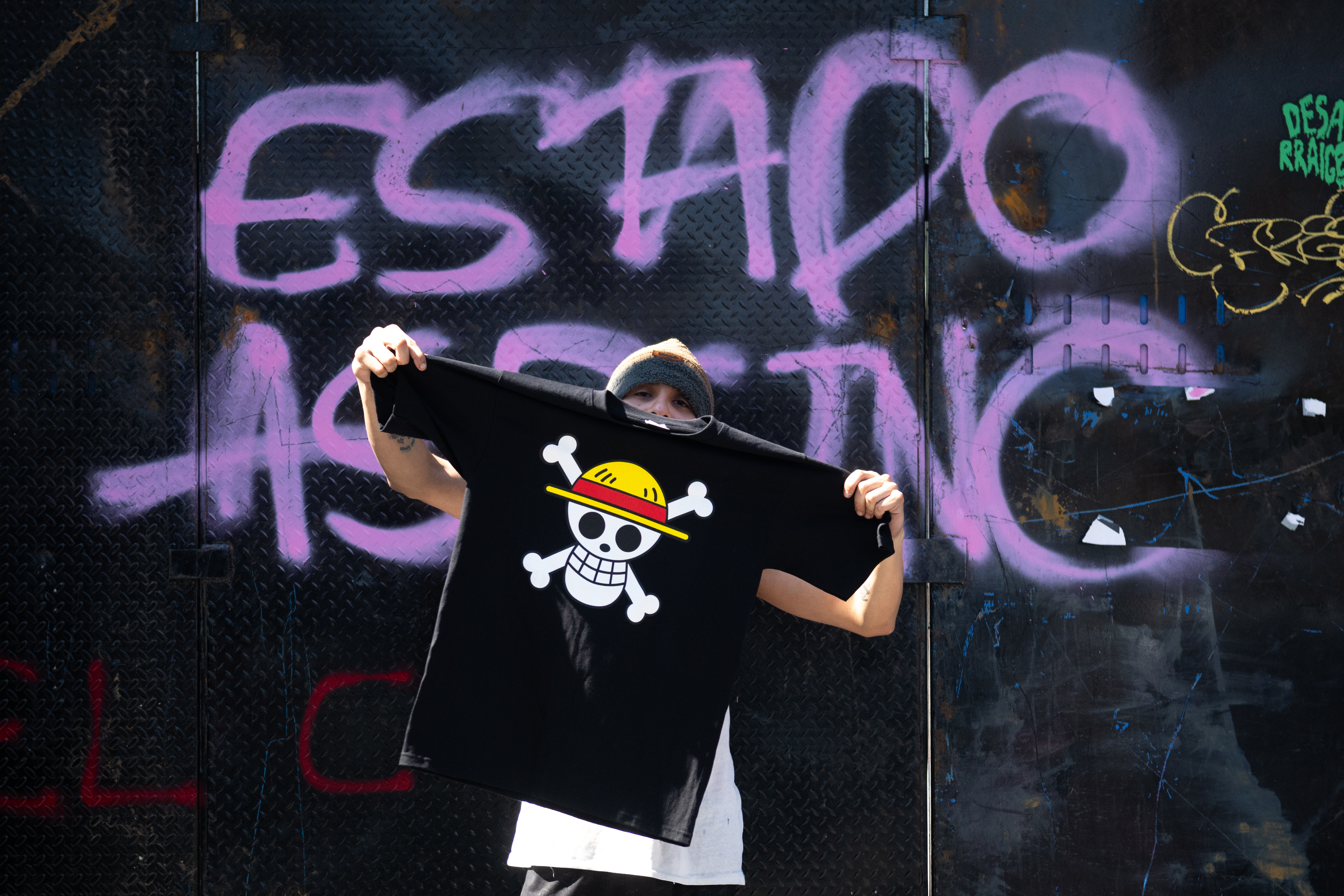
A Mexican demonstrator holds up a t-shirt featuring the Jolly Roger.

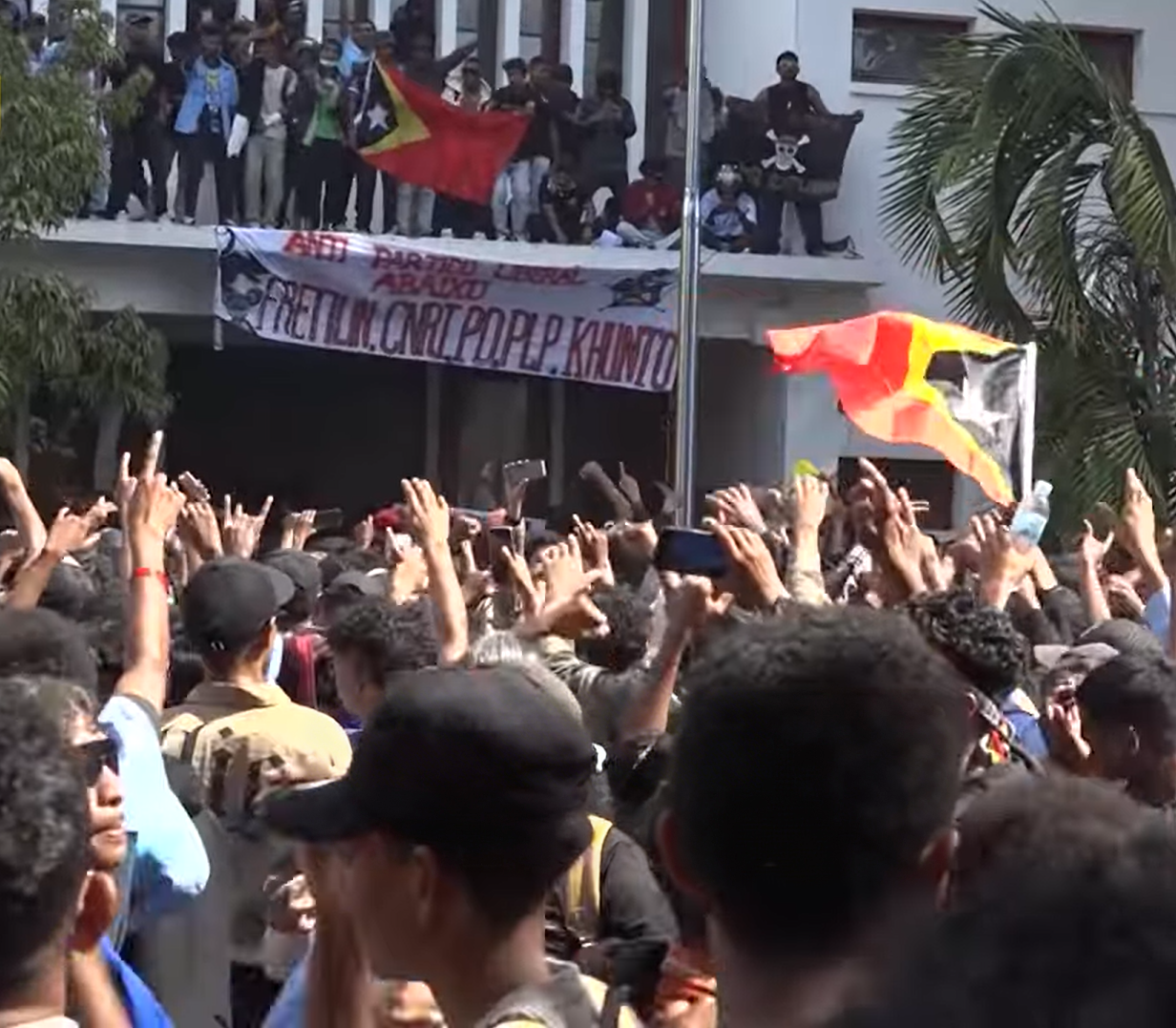
Protesters in Dili. The flag top right at UNTL building.

The Straw Hats' Jolly Roger became a symbol of Gen Z protests across the world. The flag was first used in protests in Indonesia in October 2023 in Yogyakarta, during protests against the Gaza war. The flag's usage among protester increased during the August 2025 Indonesian protests, also known as the 17+8 movement, consisting of students protesting against the Indonesian House of Representatives allowance hike, and the rising costs of food and education. The usage of the Straw Hats' Jolly Roger gained attention online and spread around the world. Afterwards, other people began to use this flag as well, including the 2025 Philippine anti-corruption protests and many others.

The Straw Hats were inspiring since they are "teenagers who fight against an extremely corrupt ruling class" and consistently do this on behalf of the oppressed and marginalized. One participant in the 2025–2026 Philippine anti-corruption protests said, “I don't want my son to grow up in a country full of corrupt officials. I want him to grow up in a country that is peaceful and promotes equality. These characters did not just entertain me throughout my childhood, they taught me values and morals that somewhat made me who I am today. … these fictional characters taught me something that I did not expect will be a factor on how I perceive society as a whole and on what kind of world I would like my son to grow up in.” Some have referred to the worldwide protests as a "Straw Hat Spring" (in reference to the Straw Hat Riot of 1922).

=== Indonesia ===
The Straw Hats' Jolly Roger was first used by protesters in Indonesia as early as October 2023 in Yogyakarta, during protests against the Gaza genocide. Student protesters in Indonesia begun flying the flag again in February 2025. Truck drivers began flying the Straw Hat Pirates' flag in late July 2025 to protest the prohibition of ODOL (over dimension, overload) trucks throughout several cities in Java, ongoing since 19 June 2025.

The flag came into prominence during the 2025 Indonesian anti-government protests which started in the weeks leading up to Independence Day on 17 August. In July, President Prabowo Subianto had called on Indonesians to fly the red and white national flag to celebrate the 80th anniversary of the country's independence. Following the president's speech an apparel store received "thousands of orders" for the Jolly Roger flag, because "The anime reflects the injustice and inequality that Indonesians experience".

=== Nepal ===
During large-scale protests and demonstrations organized by Generation Z against government corruption in Nepal during September 2025, the flag became a key symbol. Protesters displayed the flag with slogans criticizing the luxurious lifestyles of politicians' children on social media. Posts featuring the flag went viral on Nepalese social media, and its adoption quickly spread among protesters. One Nepalese protester interviewed by The Kathmandu Post remarked that the flag's use in Indonesian protests "surely popularised its use in protests in Nepal". As the government of K. P. Sharma Oli was toppled by the protests, protesters hung the flag at the gates of the Singha Durbar palace as it burned.

=== Madagascar ===
Malagasy protesters in September–October 2025 used the symbol as a gesture against the government for inadequate water and power, with protesters using a variant of the flag with a pink-and-green satroka hat, traditional of the Betsileo people, in place of the regular straw hat. The icon was adopted by social media accounts associated with protesters. By 11 October, the military CAPSAT unit had refused to fire on the protesters and they launched a coup the following day, resulting in the flight and later impeachment of President Andry Rajoelina. Protesters proceeded to hang the flag at the capital Antananarivo's Place du 13 Mai. Some protest leaders, opposed to the military takeover, began distributing T-shirts with the Malagasy variant of the flag to protesters after the coup.

=== Other countries ===
- The flag was used in the Gaza war protests, such as in London in November 2023 and in Italy in September–October 2025.
- The flag was flown by some protesters during the Trillion Peso March which was against corruption and the "ghost projects" controversy in the Philippines, During another protest in the Philippines on 12 October, a motorcycle rider carrying the flag was confronted by other protestors who suspected him of being a provocateur, and he was escorted away by police. and by university students protesting lifetime pensions for parliament members in East Timor.
- During the French anti-government Bloquons tout protests in September 2025 after the fall of the Bayrou government, some protesters carried the flag.
- The flag was present during the 2025 Peruvian protests, where the flag was once again used by demonstrators protesting against pension reforms in Peru by the government of Dina Boluarte. Specifically, the flag was present again during the protest on 24 September in Plaza San Martín, Lima. Anti-government protesters in Asunción, Paraguay, in late September along with protesters at La Paz demanding an audit for the 2025 Bolivian general election in October also carried the flag.
- Gen Z protesters in Morocco used the flag.
- British magazine The Week noted the flag's presence in protests in New York, Rome, and Slovakia.

Protester waves Straw Hats' Jolly Roger flag outside Trump Tower, January 2026

- During protests against ICE operations in Portland, United States, some protesters flew the flag. The flag also saw use during the anti-Trump No Kings 2.0 protests in October 2025, e.g. in Los Angeles, Miami, and Spokane.
- In Mexico in November 2025, the flag was among various symbols used by a group identifying itself as "Generation Z Mexico", who is against drug violence that claims tens of thousands of Mexican lives each year and the security policies of Mexican president Claudia Sheinbaum. Former Mexican president Vicente Fox wore a T-shirt emblazoned with the symbol while attending the protests.
- Bulgarians protesting against increases in pension and social security payments in November–December 2025 used the flag.
- The flag was seen during the "Flamingo Revolution" in Albania.
- In August 2026, the Straw Hat Pirates' Jolly Roger was spray-painted on the National Monument on Dam Square in Amsterdam, alongside the phrases "Time to wake up!" and "Stop the human trafficking".
- The flag was seen during the 2026 Delhi Jantar Mantar protests as well as the 2026 anti-CEC protests.
- The flag was seen waving in several locations during the 2026 French student protests.

Protesters in Perpignan during the 2026 French student protests.

== Responses ==
The Government of Indonesia, especially the leading figures from People's Consultative Assembly, called the flag a threat to the national unity of Indonesia and declared it a symbol of treason and sedition. Various government institutions, such as the Banten regional police, attempted to ban the flag. Meanwhile, the deputy speaker of DPR Sufmi Dasco Ahmad and West Java governor Dedi Mulyadi found no problem with its raising. Minister of State Secretariat Prasetyo Hadi said that President Prabowo had no issues with protesters raising the flag and considered it as freedom of speech, but urged people not to "compare it to, tarnish it, or put it in conflict with the Red and White flag".

The Guardian described the flag as "a symbol of defiance and hope for gen Z protesters" which has "resonated across borders". Tokoro Ikuya (床呂郁哉), professor of Tokyo University of Foreign Studies who studies Japanese popular culture, indicated that the flag serves as "an icon conveys a message that could be understood beyond minor different positions". Animanga expert Andrea Horbinski remarked that the flag was a natural uniting symbol, since Gen Z protesters knew that protesters would be familiar with it due to the series' popularity.

== See also ==
- Black Bauhinia flag
- Guy Fawkes mask
- Punisher skull
- Milk Tea Alliance
- Three-finger salute (pro-democracy)
