= 1990–1992 movement in Madagascar =

1990–1992 protests in Madagascar (Fihetsiketsehana 1990–1992 teto Madagasikara)
- Date: March 1990 – August 30, 1992
- Location: Madagascar
- Caused by: Electoral fraud during elections; Inspiration from the Revolutions of 1989
- Goals: Resignation of President Didier Ratsiraka; Fresh general elections; Referendum to be held
- Methods: Demonstrations, Riots
- Result: Protests suppressed by force; Demands met in 1992

Deaths and injuries
- Deaths: 130+

The 1990–1992 movement in Madagascar (Malagasy: Fihetsiketsehana 1990-1992 teto Madagasikara) was a period of widespread popular unrest in Madagascar between March 1990 and August 1992. It began as a wave of strike action against the autocratic regime of President Didier Ratsiraka and culminated in the promulgation of a new constitution and a period of democratic transition leading to Ratsiraka handing the Presidency to opposition leader Albert Zafy in March 1993.

== Background ==
Madagascar gained its independence from French colonialism in 1960 after nearly 70 years under French rule. Vice Admiral Didier Ratsiraka was sworn into office on December 21, 1975, after a military coup ousted president Philibert Tsiranana, who had been in office since 1959.

In his first term as president, Ratsiraka nationalized Madagascar’s banks, insurance companies and mineral resources, following a socialist model that was wrought with censorship and government repression. By the late 1980's Ratsiraka’s socialist regime had impoverished Madagascar. Even though the regime had made concessions to adopt the free market reforms outlined by the IMF, poverty and repression drew fast growing voices of opposition.

== Protests ==
In March 1990, a coalition of trade unions and opposition groups known as Forces Vives under the leadership of Albert Zafy organized strikes in Antananarivo. Their goal was to force the resignation of Ratsiraka and his government. Protesters were inspired by the Revolutions of 1989, which had brought down autocratic regimes in Eastern Europe the previous year. The demonstrations continued for more than a year before reaching their peak in early summer 1991 with daily protests demanding Ratsiraka step down.

On 29 July 1992, about ten soldiers opposed to Ratsiraka seized the national radio building in Antananarivo. Calling themselves the "Committee for the Salvation of the Nation", they broadcast a recording naming a priest, Michel Fety, as the country's new leader, and threatened to blow up hydroelectric dams if the army moved against them. The attempt collapsed after about three hours and the soldiers fled.

On 10 August 1991, police killed between 31 and 130 demonstrators during a march on the Presidential Palace. In August, Forces Vives called a general strike against the newly-appointed government under Prime Minister Guy Razanamasy on account of Ratsiraka's refusal to include opposition leaders. Civil service trade unions maintained the strike for four months.

In October, Ratsiraka agreed to a power sharing arrangement with opposition leader Albert Zafy, who became head of a provisional government known as the High Authority of the State, stripping Ratsiraka of much of his power.

On 19 August 1992 a new constitution implementing a semi-presidential system was put to a referendum and approved with 72% of the vote. The new constitution provided for a bicameral legislature and put limits on the powers of the President.

In presidential elections in November, Zafy won 45% of the vote, with Ratsiraka in a distant second place. In the runoff in February 1993, Zafy won more than two thirds of the vote, assuming office in March. Parliamentary elections in June produced a supermajority for the opposition parties, though Zafy's UNDD won only two seats.

== See also ==
- Rotaka
- 2002 Malagasy political crisis
- 2009 Malagasy political crisis
- 2025 Malagasy protests
