= Ruphin Zafisambo =

Prime Minister of Madagascar in 2025

Army General Ruphin Zafisambo
- Zafisambo in 2025

29th Prime Minister of Madagascar
- In office 6 October 2025 – 20 October 2025
- President: Andry Rajoelina; Michael Randrianirina
- Preceded by: Christian Ntsay
- Succeeded by: Herintsalama Rajaonarivelo

Chief of Military Staff to the Prime Minister
- In office 1 July 2020 – 6 October 2025
- Prime Minister: Christian Ntsay

Deputy Secretary General to the Prime Minister
- In office 27 March 2019 – 1 July 2020
- Prime Minister: Christian Ntsay

Personal details
- Born: Ruphin Fortunat Zafisambo Dimbisoa Farafangana, Madagascar
- Education: Antsirabe Military Academy

Military service
- Allegiance: Madagascar
- Branch/service: Madagascar Armed Forces
- Years of service: 1991–present
- Rank: Army general

Ruphin Fortunat Zafisambo Dimbisoa is a Malagasy general who served as the 29th prime minister of Madagascar in 2025. Having served in the role for two weeks, he is the shortest-serving prime minister in Malagasy history. Zafisambo was also the last prime minister to serve under the presidency of Andry Rajoelina, who was deposed in a 2025 coup.

Born in Farafangana, Zafisambo graduated from the Antsirabe Military Academy in 1991. He later carried out advanced military training in France and Algeria where he subsequently completed. In 2019, Zafisambo was appointed Deputy Secretary General to the Prime Minister under Prime Minister Christian Ntsay and served in this role until the following year where he was appointed Chief of Military Staff to the Prime Minister.

In 2025, amidst the 2025 Malagasy protests led by Gen Z, President Andry Rajoelina fired Ntsay and his government and appointed Zafisambo prime minister in an attempt to calm down the protesters. However, protests grew and on 14 October, Rajoelina was officially impeached by the National Assembly. Colonel Michael Randrianirina, the leader of the coup that followed the protests was installed as president. Thus, Zafisambo was the last prime minister to serve under Rajoelina. Just two weeks after being appointed prime minister, Zafisambo was replaced by Herintsalama Rajaonarivelo.

== Biography ==
From the southeastern coastal town of Farafangana, he is of Antefasy heritage. Ruphin Fortunat Dimbisoa Zafisambo is a career military officer in the Malagasy Army. He began his studies at the Antsirabe Military Academy in 1991. He continued his training with advanced military education in France.

He subsequently completed his academic training in Algeria, in Montpellier, France, and in Madagascar.

He held the position of Deputy Secretary General of the Government before being appointed, in 2020, as Chief of Military Staff to Prime Minister Christian Ntsay within the Prime Minister's Office.

On 6 October 2025, he was appointed Prime Minister by the President of the Republic, succeeding Christian Ntsay, who was dismissed from his functions a week earlier due to mass protests. His appointment came as a surprise, as his name was not on the lists of anticipated candidates previously circulating. He formed the brief Zafisambo government. He was succeeded by Colonel Michael Randrianirina.

Political offices
Preceded by Christian Ntsay	Prime Minister of Madagascar; 2025	Succeeded by Herintsalama Rajaonarivelo
