= High Constitutional Court of Madagascar =

Constitutional High Court Fitsarana Avo momba ny Lalàmpanorenana
- Fitsarana Avo momba ny Lalàmpanorenana
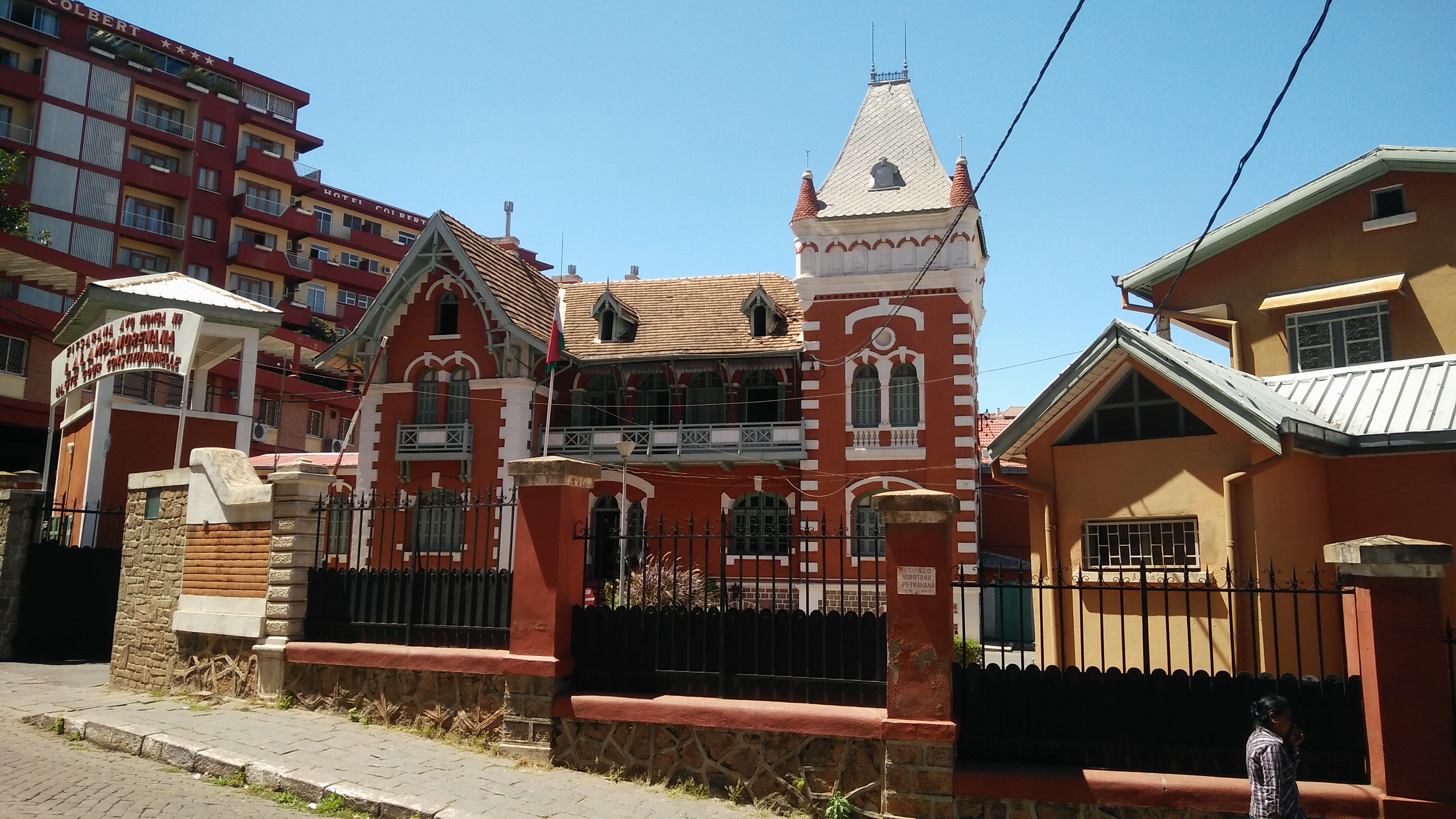
- Seat of the Constitutional High Court in Antananarivo.
- Established: December 31, 1975; 50 years ago
- Location: State Palace of Ambohidahy, Antananarivo
- Composition method: Constitutional court
- Authorised by: Constitution of Madagascar
- Judge term length: 7 years, non-renewable
- Number of positions: 9
- Website: www.hcc.gov.mg

President
- Currently: Florent Rakotoarisoa
- Since: April 8, 2021

The High Constitutional Court (HCC) (in Malagasy: Fitsarana Avo momba ny Lalàmpanorenana) is one of the five institutions of Madagascar under Article 40 of the Constitution of the Fourth Republic.

It rules in particular on the conformity with the Constitution of laws, treaties and the rules of procedure of the parliamentary assemblies. It ensures the regularity of national elections and referendums.

== History ==
=== First Republic ===
Under the First Republic, the Constitution of April 29, 1959 entrusted the function of constitutional jurisdiction to the Superior Council of Institutions, composed of five members and responsible for monitoring the conformity with the Constitution of the entire internal legal order.

=== Second Republic ===
The Constitution of December 31, 1975 establishing the Democratic Republic of Madagascar created the High Constitutional Court among the state institutions, expanding its powers to include competence conflicts between institutions.

=== Third Republic ===
During the political transition of 1991, the Convention of October 31 suspended certain institutions but maintained the High Constitutional Court as the guarantor of the general principles of law, temporarily increasing its members to eleven.

The Constitution of September 18, 1992 attempted to integrate the Constitutional Court into a new judicial structure, but this reform was never implemented. However, the constitutional revision of April 8, 1998 reaffirmed the High Constitutional Court as a full-fledged state institution, entrusting it with new responsibilities related to decentralization.

=== Fourth Republic ===
Following the events of 2009, the constitution of the third Republic was suspended and all institutions were dissolved by Andry Rajoelina, who proclaimed himself Head of State. In August 2010, he signed a political agreement with 178 parties, although without the approval of the movements of the former heads of state. A draft Constitution, quickly written, was submitted to a referendum on November 17, 2010, with results validated by the High Constitutional Court on December 6 and promulgated on December 11. This new Constitution, very close to that of the Third Republic, amended in 2007, confers the same attributions to the constitutional jurisdiction.

On October 14, 2025, following the coup d'état amidst the protests in opposition to the regime, Colonel Michaël Randrianirina announced the dissolution of the High Constitutional Court and the suspension of the constitution · · . After a decision by the latter to dismiss Andry Rajoelina, Randrianirina decided to reverse his decision and comply with the law and the constitutional jurisdiction.

== Composition ==
The High Constitutional Court comprises nine High Counselors appointed for a single seven-year term, thus guaranteeing their independence. The method of appointment reflects a balanced distribution among the different state institutions: three members are appointed by the President of the Republic, two are elected by the National Assembly, two by the Senate and two by the Superior Council of the Judiciary. The president of the institution is elected by his peers from among the members of the Court, and all appointments are formally recorded by presidential decree.

High Counselors cannot combine their functions with a government, parliamentary, or any elective public office. Any paid professional activity is prohibited, with the notable exception of teaching. Similarly, any membership in a political party or trade union is incompatible with their function, thus reinforcing their impartiality and independence in the exercise of their duties.

=== Current composition ===
Composition since April 8, 2021
Name	Function
Florent Rakotoarisoa	President
William Noelson	High Counselor – Dean
Germaine Bakoly Ratovonelinjafy Razanoarisoa	High Counselor
Vololoniriana Christiane Rakotobe Andriamarojasoa	High Counselor
Antonia Rakotoniaina Raverohanitrambolaniony	High Counselor
Fidèle Mbalo Ranaivo	High Counselor
Georges Merlin Rasolo Nandrasana	High Counselor
Rondro Lucette Razanadrainiarison Rahelimanantsoa	High Counselor
Rojoniaina Andriamaholy Ranaivoson	High Counselor

== Jurisdiction ==
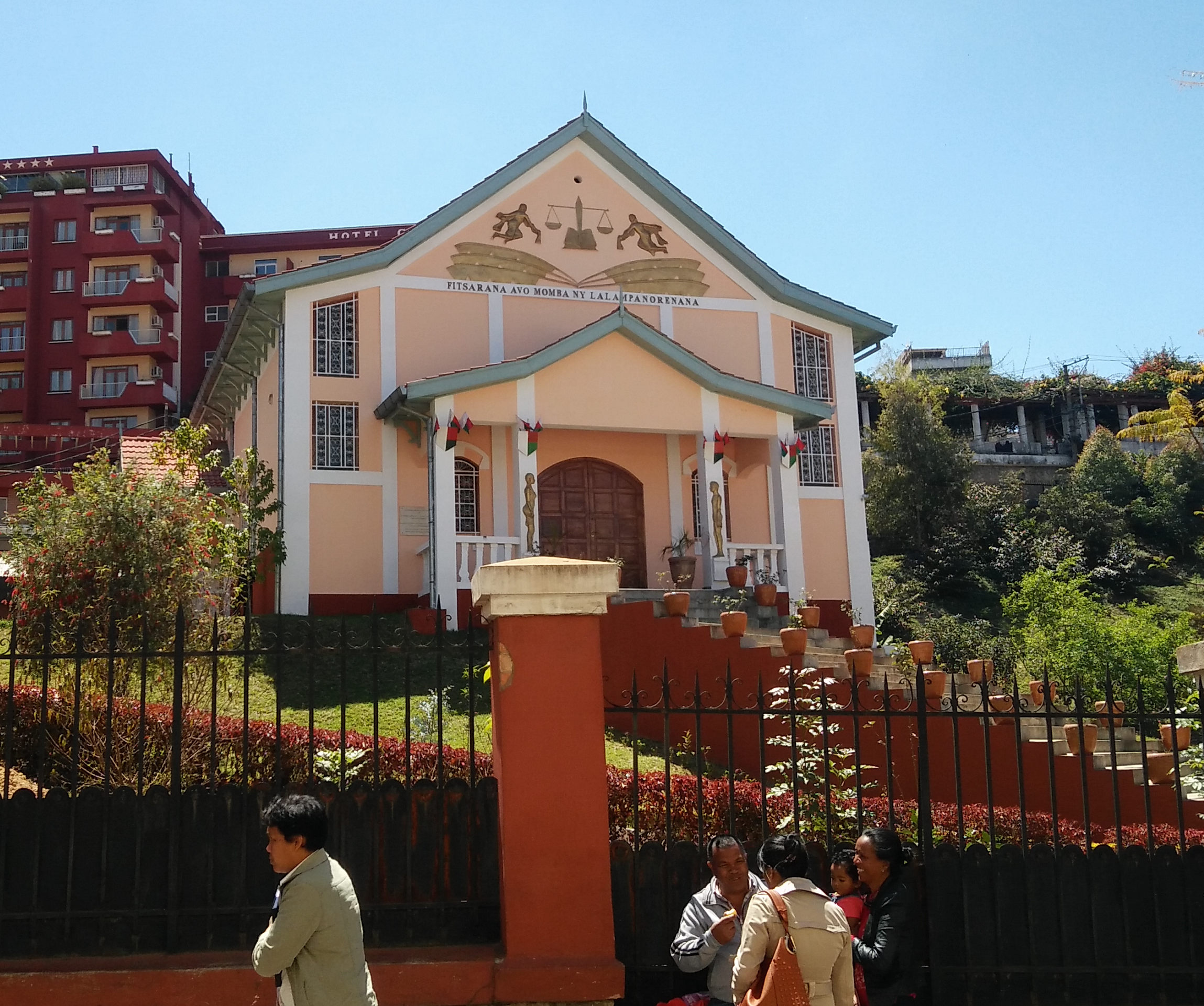
Courthouse of the High Constitutional Court in Ambohidahy, Antananarivo.

The High Constitutional Court exercises fundamental powers of constitutional review. It rules on the conformity with the Constitution of international treaties, ordinary laws, organic laws, ordinances and international conventions. The review is mandatory for organic laws and ordinances before their promulgation, as well as for the rules of procedure of the parliamentary assemblies before their implementation. For ordinary laws, the review can be triggered before promulgation by the President of the Republic, a quarter of the members of a parliamentary assembly, or the bodies of decentralized territorial communities.

The constitutional jurisdiction also has significant contentious powers. It has jurisdiction over disputes concerning referendum operations and presidential and legislative elections. It can be referred to in order to review the constitutionality of any text with legislative or regulatory value by the heads of institutions or a quarter of the parliamentarians. It rules on exceptions of unconstitutionality raised before any court and on questions infringing upon fundamental rights. It can be consulted by any head of institution to give its opinion on the constitutionality of a draft act or on the interpretation of a constitutional provision. Finally, it ascertains the vacancy of the presidency of the Republic in case of removal of the president pronounced by the High Court of Justice.

== Procedure ==
The right to refer matters to the High Constitutional Court is granted to the President of the Republic, to any head of institution, to a quarter of the members composing one of the parliamentary assemblies, as well as to the bodies of territorial communities. Ordinary courts can also refer matters to it in the context of an exception of unconstitutionality or violations of fundamental rights.

The rulings and decisions of the High Constitutional Court must be reasoned and are not subject to any appeal, which gives them a definitive character. They are binding on all public authorities as well as on administrative and judicial authorities, thus ensuring the effectiveness of constitutional supremacy. In addition to its jurisdictional decisions, the Court also issues advisory opinions which, although not binding, benefit from high legal value and great moral authority in the Malagasy legal order.

== Criticism ==
The High Constitutional Court is recognized as a necessity to better guarantee the existence of the rule of law in Madagascar. However, it is criticized by some constitutionalists, particularly in the context of the constitutional review of laws it is responsible for carrying out. In September 2023, Raymond Ranjeva, former judge at the International Court of Justice, had denounced the lack of impartiality of the High Counselors as well as the omission of the strict application of the constitution by them.

== See also ==
=== Related articles ===
- Constitutional law
- Constitution of Madagascar

=== External links ===
- Official website of the High Constitutional Court of Madagascar
