= 2009 Camp Capsat mutiny =

Mutiny in the Madagascar Armed Forces

Camp Capsat 2009 Mutiny
Date	March 8, 2009 – March 17, 2009
Location	Madagascar
Status	Defence Minister ousted by mutinous soldiers resulting in pro-mutiny soldier becoming head of the army along with a pro-mutiny Defence Minister. The threat of a coup or a military junta taking over from Marc Ravalomanana still great. Marc Ravalomanana was ousted in a bloodless coup on March 16, 2009 and March 17, 2009 and replaced by the opposition.

Belligerents
Madagascar Army	Camp Capsat Garrison

Strength
13,500 soldiers	600 mutineers

Casualties and losses
None	None
- None

The 2009 Camp Capsat mutiny was the mutiny of a section of the Madagascar Armed Forces which led to the ousting of Madagascar president Marc Ravalomanana on March 17, 2009, and to the nomination of Andry Rajoelina as President of the High Transitional Authority later that day. The 2009 Camp Capsat mutiny began near the Malagasy capital of Antananarivo on March 8, 2009.

== First day ==
In the early morning of March 8, 2009, Camp Capsat, near the capital of Antananarivo, mutinied and stated that they did not support the government's actions in a growing violent dispute between President Marc Ravalomanana and the former mayor of Antananarivo, Andry Rajoelina. The feud has resulted in violent street protests across the country since the beginning of February resulting in at least 28 deaths to up to 135 people killed in resulting looting after the first riots. Camp Capsat soldiers, numbering 600 broke out of the military base and have seized a main road leading to the capital setting up a roadblock after reports came in that the Presidential Guard was preparing to attack the camp.

The mutiny has occurred by military members who have refused to follow high ups in the military as clashes between opposition supporters and military forces in Madagascar have killed four people since Wednesday.

== Second Day ==
"An AFP reporter was able to access one wing of the military compound, where soldiers who refused to be quoted confirmed that the base was rebelling in protest at the regime’s repression of opposition demonstrations. The army chief of staff came this morning in an attempt to sweet-talk us but he quickly had to get back in his car and leave, said one of them."

The government military minister has warned mutinous soldiers that they will face action and he stated that he hopes the army "doesn't fracture" as the situation is a political problem, not a military problem and it does not need the involvement "of the army." Western analysts predict that the situation in Madagascar will only be solved when the military decides to join the opposition or remain loyal to the president.

== Third Day ==
Mutinous soldiers at Camp Capsat still maintain their roadblock and control Camp Capsat outside of the capital and no action has been taken by the Presidential Guard. There are no reports that other military units have joined the mutiny.

== Fourth Day ==
General Edmond Rasolofomahandry, leader of the Madagascar armed forces was sacked by the President of Madagascar after threatening to take control of the country in 72 hours if the President and Opposition did not come to a peaceful conclusion. His threat resulted in the defence minister a key Presidential ally resigning. The President then appointed Andre Andriarijaona as the new military general of the Madagascar military.

With the resignation of the army chief and the Defense Minister and the installation of pro-mutiny army chief and Defence Minister may lead to a military junta or a coup against President Marc Ravalomanana. Most people in Madagascar believe Marc Ravalomanana will be replaced.

== See also ==
- 2025 Malagasy mutiny
