= Mamitiana Rajaonarison =

Prime Minister of Madagascar since 2026

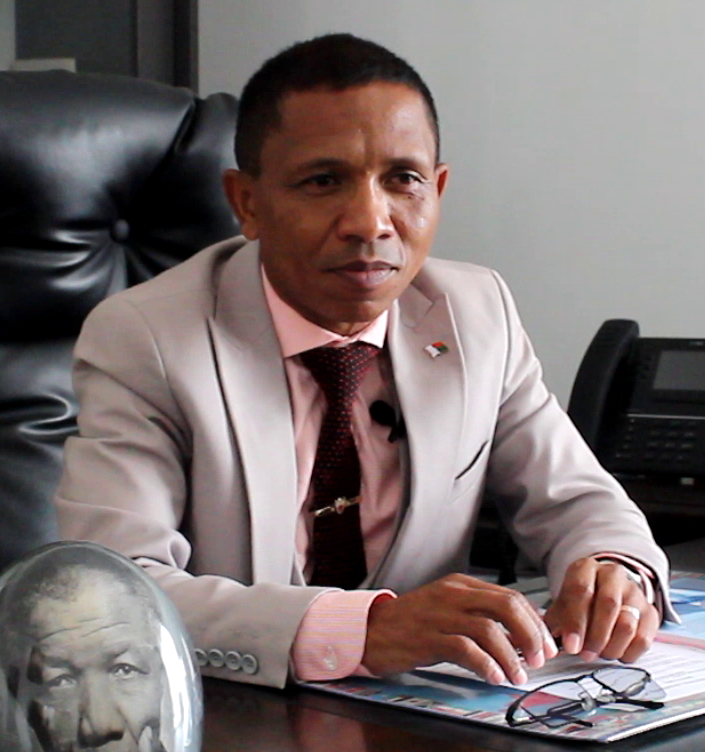
- Rajonarison in 2026

Prime Minister of Madagascar
- Incumbent
- Assumed office 15 March 2026
- President: Michael Randrianirina
- Preceded by: Herintsalama Rajaonarivelo

Personal details
- Education: Antsirabe Military Academy; Military Academy of the National Gendarmerie; École nationale d'administration

Mamitiana Rajaonarison is a Malagasy military officer and politician who has served as Prime Minister of Madagascar since 2026. Rajaonarison has served as the head of SAMIFIN, Madagascar's financial intelligence unit, since 2021 and was appointed Prime Minister on 15 March 2026. After leading the Independent Anti-Corruption Bureau in Toliara Province, he took charge of SAMIFIN in 2021, a position to which he was reappointed in 2025.

== Biography ==
=== Education ===
Mamitiana Rajaonarison began his military training at the Antsirabe Military Academy, where he obtained his officer's diploma between 1995 and 1998. He then continued at the École supérieure de gendarmerie in Moramanga, obtaining the diploma from the officer application course from 1998 to 1999.

He pursued an international path by training at the Military Academy of the National Gendarmerie in Melun, France, as part of the International Senior Gendarmerie Course, from which he graduated in 2003.

Parallel to his career, he obtained a diploma from the École nationale d'administration in France in 2008, specializing in "Institution Administration." He supplemented this course of study with a master's degree in political science from the Institut d'études politiques of Madagascar, obtained in 2015.

=== Professional career ===
Upon graduating from the application school, he was appointed squadron commander of student gendarmes at the National Gendarmerie School in Moramanga from 2003 to 2004. Previously, he had gained initial experience in France as head of the criminal investigation section at the French National Gendarmerie from 2000 to 2002.

In 2004, Rajaonarison joined the Independent Anti-Corruption Bureau as a principal investigator, a position he held until 2008. He was then promoted to head of the investigation division within the same institution, a role he would hold for a decade, from 2008 to 2018.

In 2018, he was appointed director of the independent anti-corruption bureau for the Toliara province, a regional position he held until 2021.

Since 2021, Rajaonarison has been the Director General of Samifin (Madagascar's Financial Intelligence Service). In this capacity, he is responsible for combating money laundering and the financing of terrorism.

=== Political career ===
On 15 March 2026, he was appointed Prime Minister by president Michael Randrianirina.

== See also ==
=== Related articles ===
- Politics of Madagascar
- Prime Minister of Madagascar
