= Zafisambo government =

Form government of Madagascar in 2025

- Cabinet of Madagascar
- 2025
- Date formed: 6 October 2025
- Date dissolved: 20 October 2025

People and organisations
- Prime Minister: Ruphin Zafisambo

History
- Predecessor: Ntsay government
- Successor: Rajaonarivelo government

The Zafisambo government was the executive branch of Madagascar, headed from 6 October to 20 October 2025, by Prime Minister Ruphin Zafisambo.

== Appointments in the Zafisambo Government ==
Name	Position
General Deramasimanjaka Manantsoa Rakotoarivelo	Minister of the Armed Forces
General Rakotondrazaka Andriatsarafara Andriamitovy	Deputy Minister in charge of the Gendarmerie
Police Controller General Radriambelo Mandimbin’ny Aina Mbolanoro	Minister of Public Security

== See also ==
- Cabinet of Madagascar
