= Herintsalama Rajaonarivelo =

Prime Minister of Madagascar (2025–2026)

Prime Minister of Madagascar
- In office 20 October 2025 – 9 March 2026
- President: Michael Randrianirina
- Preceded by: Ruphin Zafisambo
- Succeeded by: Mamitiana Rajaonarison

Personal details
- Born: Herintsalama Andriamiasy Rajaonarivelo
- Spouse: Nirina Raharo (m. 1994)
- Education: Toulouse Capitole University
- Profession: Politician; businessman; economist

Herintsalama Andriamiasy Rajaonarivelo is a Malagasy politician, businessman, and economist who served as the Prime Minister of Madagascar from October 2025 until March 2026. Prior to his appointment as prime minister, Rajaonarivelo served as Chairman of the Board of Directors of BNI Madagascar and was thus a prominent figure in the Malagasy economic and banking sector.

== Education ==
Herintsalama Rajaonarivelo holds a postgraduate degree in industrial economics and business economics from the Toulouse Capitole University in France.

== Career ==
=== Professional career ===
Trained as an international consultant, he has carried out numerous missions for international organizations including the World Bank, the European Union, the Secretariat General of the ACP Countries, the COMESA, the SADC, the IOC and the African Development Bank.

He has been chairman and chief executive officer of the Banque nationale de l'industrie|National Industrial Bank] since November 2020. He has been chairman of the International Trade Board of Madagascar since November 2011.

He is the founding president of FOM (Fikambanan'ny Orinasa Malagasy), a network of businesses working for the formalization and competitiveness of the private sector. In an interview published in May 2025, he stated that "SMEs constitute the tax base," arguing for a reform of the fiscal and administrative framework to encourage formalization and economic growth.

He has spoken at economic conferences, including the forum "Innovative Growth Strategy and Leadership in the Banking Sector in Madagascar," organized by Altitude Madagascar in November 2024.

=== Political career ===
He began his government career as a technical advisor at the Ministry of Foreign Affairs from February 2019 to April 2020.

On 20 October 2025, following the mass demonstrations that began on 25 September 2025 and evolved into the 2025 Malagasy coup d'état, he was appointed Prime Minister of Madagascar by President Michael Randrianirina. Ruphin Zafisambo had been appointed a fortnight earlier by Andry Rajoelina, prior to the coup d'état.

On 9 March 2026, President Michael Randrianirina dismissed multiple cabinet members and Rajaonarivelo himself, removing him as Prime Minister.

== See also ==
- Politics of Madagascar
