= Rotaka =

Madagascan protests, 1971–1972

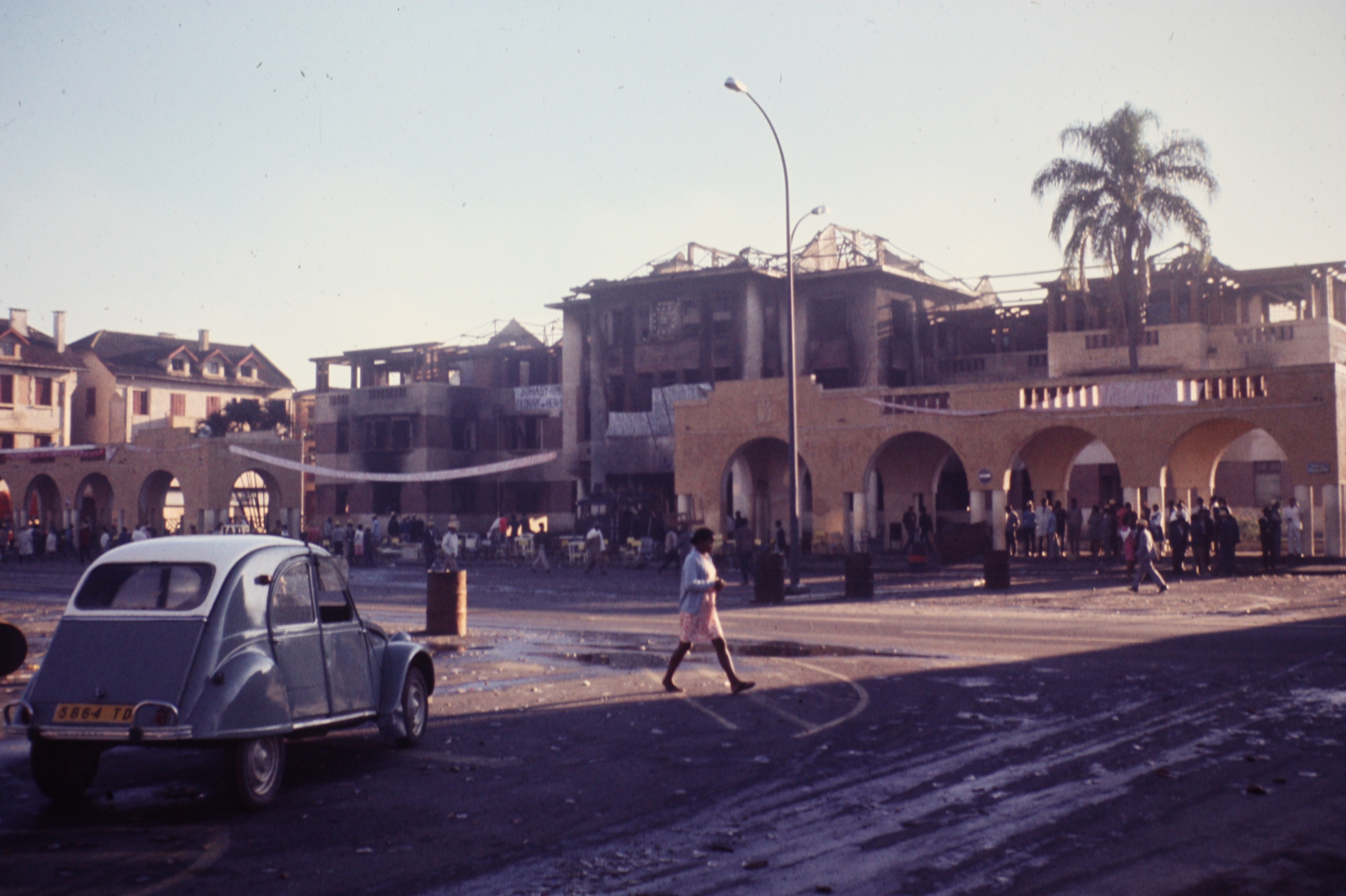
Protesters in Antananarivo burned the Hotel de Ville city hall in 1972.

The rotaka was a series of farmer and student protests in Madagascar between April 1971 and May 1972 that led to the collapse of the First Republic of Madagascar under President Philibert Tsiranana.

== Background ==
Madagascar regained independence from France in 1960. The nation's first president, Philibert Tsiranana, was not selected in an open election, but rather was nominated by the senate, in which Tsiranana's heavily pro-French Socialist Democratic Party (PSD) dominated. The PSD was an outgrowth of PADESM, a pro-French, pro-cotiers (coastal peoples') party formed in reaction to the establishment of MDRM in 1946 by Merina elites, who many cotiers feared would attempt to re-establish the Merina hegemony that existed under the pre-colonial Kingdom of Imerina. Under Tsiranana's leadership, French influence remained ever present. In 1969, foreigners controlled 95% of the modern industrial sector and produced a quarter of all exported agricultural products, despite making up a tiny fraction of the population. The sale of manufactured goods was largely controlled by the South Asian population, while import-export companies were French-owned. Although Madagascar enjoyed a period of economic prosperity for much of the First Republic, the late 1960s saw a recession and deterioration in quality of life in Madagascar, largely prompted by global economic conditions but to which the Tsiranana response had been ineffectual and muted.

Popular disapproval of the Tsiranana administration began to grow. Among his loudest critics was Monja Jaona, a Tandroy politician of the MONIMA party who had served two years as mayor of Toliara (1959–1961) before being chased from office by power politics. Jaona had since developed an image as an opposition figure and champion of the common man against the increasingly unpopular policies of the PSD, including the neo-colonial economic and cultural relationship with France perpetuated by PSD political elites.

Over the first decade of PSD domination in Malagasy politics, PSD members gradually became less focused on the shared objective of preventing a revival of Merina power as under the former Kingdom of Madagascar, and more on maximizing access to political and financial benefits for their particular ethnic group. By 1970, there were strong tensions within the PSD between its alliance of northern and western members - including the Tsimihety president Tsiranana – and members in the southern part of the island, who were relatively marginalized and increasingly sympathetic to Jaona. To neutralize Jaona and the crush the MONIMA party, the PSD devised a ploy whereby the Minister of the Interior, Andre Resampa from the western coastal town of Morondava, approached Jaona on 10 March 1971 to urge him to lead a movement to unseat Tsiranana. Jaona's eventual action would provide PSD with an opportunity to arrest the leader and other key party figures in the "rebellion", which they would stave off before it grew large enough to pose a threat; Tsiranana's advisers expected the arrest of Jaona would also demoralize and hobble southern PSD politicians and their constituencies alike, and cement northern control of the party and the country's politics.

== Farmer protests (1971) ==
Jaona incited armed farmers to protest in Toliara in early April 1971. MONIMA was dissolved by official decree on 3 April 1971. On 6 April Tsiranana gave a radio address in which he blamed Jaona for the bloodshed resulting from clashes between the police and armed protesters and accused him of being a communist, which Jaona loudly denied, instead declaring himself a nationalist since the day he was born. On 12 May, Tsiranana and six ministers, including Resampa, came to Toliara to meet with Jaona; the MONIMA leader only agreed to talk with the president if the conversation could be held in the Malagasy language rather than French, a term to which Tsiranana agreed. Jaona declared that he sought to find a way to work in harmony with the president, and was released from prison.

While the protest had been quickly foiled and MONIMA disbanded, Jaona's efforts made a significant impact on public opinion of Tsiranana. The Malagasy people's image of their country as moramora (laid back, gentle) and their first president as a refined leader had been shattered by his violent crushing of the clearly harmless farmer protest.

== Student protests (1971–1972) ==
On 24 March 1971, students at the College of Medicine in Antananarivo started a protest to express popular rejection of the policies and repression of president Tsiranana's neo-colonial administration. The protest quickly spread to include 5,000 students across numerous colleges at the University of Antananarivo. Tsiranana responded by temporarily closing the university and forbidding the meetings of numerous student organizations, while continuing to permit that of the PSD-affiliated socialist student group. The news media reported this protest and that occurring in Toliara, inspiring students in high schools and junior high schools to launch protests in solidarity beginning on 19 April. A committee was formed of students, media, lawyers and other figures to demand information on the status of the prisoners sent to Nosy Lava, which resulted in the rapid release of the southerners held in the island prison.

On 24 April 1972, secondary school students in the capital of Antananarivo protested in solidarity with the city's medical university students to support revisions of the colonial era curriculum and the dismissal of teachers from France. On 13 May, security forces shot student protesters in Antananarivo.

== Aftermath ==
Within days, Tsiranana announced his resignation and a transitional government was put in place under General Gabriel Ramanantsoa.

Madagascar's most popular musical group, Mahaleo, was formed by high school students who performed at their school's protests in Antsirabe.

== See also ==
- 1990-1992 Movement in Madagascar
- 2002 Malagasy political crisis
- 2009 Malagasy political crisis
- 2025 Malagasy protests
