= Constitution of Madagascar =

The current Constitution of Madagascar (Malagasy: Lalàmpanorenan' i Madagasikara) was, according to the national electoral commission, endorsed by a majority of voters in the constitutional referendum held on 14 November 2010. The new constitution launched the Fourth Republic of Madagascar and was widely seen as an attempt to consolidate and legitimise the rule of Andry Rajoelina and his High Transitional Authority government which was installed after a military-backed coup d'état against President Marc Ravalomanana at the beginning of the ongoing national political crisis. One substantive change from the constitution of the Third Republic was to lower the minimum age for presidential candidates from 40 to 35. This made Rajoelina, aged 36 at the time, eligible to stand in presidential elections.

The constitution has been suspended since 14 October 2025 following a coup d'état against Rajoelina. In February 2026, the Council of the Presidency for the Re-Foundation of the Republic of Madagascar announced that it would draft a constitution for the Fifth Republic, which will be submitted to the electorate for approval.

== Constitution of the Fourth Republic ==
On November 22, 2010, the electoral commission of Madagascar announced that a new constitution had been endorsed in a referendum by 74 percent of voters. It put voter turnout for the poll at 53 percent. One substantive change made by the new constitution was to lower the minimum age for presidential candidates from 40 to 35. This made Andry Rajoelina, who is 36 and is the President of the country's High Transitional Authority, eligible to stand in presidential elections.

== Constitution of the Third Republic ==
The Third Republic received its first expression of popular support and legitimacy on August 19, 1992, when the constitutional framework constructed by the National Conference was approved by more than 75 percent of those voting in a popular referendum (the constitution took effect on September 12). On this date, the people overwhelmingly approved a new constitution consisting of 149 articles that provided for the separation of powers among the executive, legislative, and judicial branches of government; the creation of a multiparty political system; and the protection of individual human rights and freedom of speech.

The third constitution of Madagascar was amended in 1995, 1998, and 2007.

== Structure of government ==
The power of the executive branch is divided between a president who is elected by universal suffrage and a prime minister from the parliament who is nominated by his/her peers but who must be approved by the president. If the nominee for prime minister does not achieve an absolute majority of support within the parliament, the president may choose a candidate from the parliament who will serve for one year. As captured in the Malagasy concept ray aman-dreny (father and mother of the nation), enshrined in Article 44 of the constitution, the president serves as the symbol of national unity. The president also is the recognized decision maker in foreign policy and is the single most powerful person within the country. All presidential decrees must be countersigned, however, and the president is bound by the constitutional reality that the prime minister is responsible for the functioning of the government.

The president is elected for a five-year period and is limited to two terms in office. In the event that no candidate wins a simple majority of the popular vote, a run-off election is held between the two leading candidates within a period of two months. The most important unwritten law regarding the executive branch revolves around the côtier/central highlands distinction. If a côtier is elected president, it is understood that a Merina will fill the position of prime minister, and vice versa.

The constitution provides for a bicameral parliament composed of a Senate and a National Assembly (Assembleé Nationale). The Senate represents territorial groups and serves as the consultative chamber on social and economic issues. Two-thirds of its members are chosen by an Electoral College and the remaining one-third are chosen by the president. The National Assembly consists of 151 deputies elected by universal suffrage in one and two-member constituencies. In single-member constituencies, representatives are elected by simple majority, in the two-member constituencies, closed party lists are used, with the two seats distributed using a highest averages method. Both senators and deputies serve for five years. The parliament as a whole operates with a variety of classic parliamentary measures, such as the possibility of a vote of no confidence, that enable it to serve as a check on the power of the executive.

A new system of local governance under the constitution is known as the Decentralized Territorial Authorities (Collectivités Territoriales Décentralisées).

A strong, independent judiciary is also enshrined in the 1992 constitution. An eleven-member supreme court serves as the highest arbiter of the laws of the land. Other judicial bodies include the Administrative and Financial Constitutional Court, the Appeals Courts, tribunals and the High Court of Justice. The creation of this complex system indicates the desire of the framers of the constitution for a society built upon the rule of law. Indeed, the constitution explicitly outlines the fundamental rights of individual citizens and groups (most notably freedom of speech) and guarantees the existence of an independent press free from government control or censorship.

The creation of a truly free and fair multiparty system is the centerpiece of the new constitutional order.

== Draft of the Fifth Republic Constitution ==
After seizing power following the 2025 Malagasy coup d'état, Colonel Michael Randrianirina promised an election within two years and said a committee composed of officers from the army, the paramilitary gendarmerie, and the national police would govern the nation. Addressing reporters and nearby protesters, he said: “The constitution is suspended. We will hold a referendum within two years to establish a new democratic order.” On 15 October 2025, Malagasy state television announced that Randrianirina would be inaugurated on 17 October as "President of the Refoundation of the Republic of Madagascar" during a session of the Constitutional Court. He was sworn in on that date as planned.

On 10 December 2025, the National Consultation of Madagascar was officially launched in the capital to discuss constitutional reforms aimed at establishing the country's Fifth Republic. According to Minister of State for Refoundation Hanitriniaina Razafimanantsoa, the consultation will last six months.

=== 24-month transitional plan ===
On 28 February 2026, the Council of the Presidency for the Re-Foundation of the Republic of Madagascar released the national Refoundation, outlining a 24-month transition in 2026–2027. The first phase, from March 2026 to January 2027, will hold nationwide consultations to gather citizens’ proposals and ideas on institutional reform. From June 2026 to May 2027, authorities will revise the legal and structural framework to prepare for a constitutional or referendum vote and a presidential election that meets international standards. Between January and April 2027, they will draft the Fifth Republic constitution, which will be submitted to the electorate for approval. A presidential election is scheduled for September 2027. From May to December 2027, the Refoundation will organize the constitutional referendum and the subsequent presidential and territorial elections, depending on the electoral model chosen.
