= Antsirabe Military Academy =

Military academy in Antsirabe, Madagascar

- Akademia Miaramila Antsirabe

Location
- Antsirabe, Vakinankaratra, Madagascar; 19°52′S 47°02′E

Information
- Type: Military academy
- Established: May 10, 1966
- Status: Active
- Rector: Général de Brigade Ratsarahevitra Andriamisetra
- Affiliations: Madagascar Armed Forces

The Antsirabe Military Academy (ACMIL) (Note: (French: Académie militaire d'Antsirabe; Malagasy: Akademia Miaramila Antsirabe)) is a military academy in Antsirabe, Madagascar. Established in 1966, it provides initial officer training for the Madagascar Armed Forces, the National Gendarmerie, and select civil service roles. The academy has trained over 3,000 officers since its founding.

== History ==
Following Madagascar's independence from France in 1960, the new republic inherited a small colonial force known as the Tafika Malagasy (Malagasy Troops), comprising approximately 5,000 personnel across the army, navy, air force, and gendarmerie. Initial officer training was conducted in French military schools under a bilateral cooperation agreement, with candidates selected via competitive examinations. To build domestic capacity and address a shortage of commissioned officers, the Antsirabe Military Academy was established by Decree No. 66-222 on 10 May 1966 under President Philibert Tsiranana. The academy opened in 1967 with its first cohort of cadets enrolled in a three-year program, focusing on training officers for the armed forces, gendarmerie, and civil service. During the 1970s, under President Didier Ratsiraka, some cadets were sent to military academies in Eastern Bloc countries for advanced training lasting three to five years, including preliminary language instruction; however, returnees often faced challenges with integration and credential recognition. By 2017, it had graduated more than 3,000 officers over five decades. Recent promotions, such as the 45th in 2022 (named after Lieutenant Colonel Rakotomiliarison Hery Fanomezantsoa), have included specialized graduates like pilots.

== Academics ==
The academy offers a three-year bachelor's-level program leading to commissions as second lieutenants. The curriculum emphasizes military and leadership skills, including:

Strategy and defense security Leadership and communication Tactics General and technical military education Legal and regulatory knowledge

Cadets undergo rigorous physical training, field exercises, and academic coursework. Upon graduation, they receive brevets and are assigned to units within the Malagasy armed forces or gendarmerie. Annual promotions are ceremonially named after distinguished Malagasy military figures, such as the 44th promotion honoring Admiral Didier Ratsiraka and the 46th after General de Corps d’Armée Razafitombo Léon Evariste.

== Campus ==
The academy is located in the highlands of Antsirabe, approximately 170 km (110 mi) south of Antananarivo. It houses barracks, training grounds, classrooms, and the Akamia Museum, a military history exhibit. The campus supports international training exchanges, including joint exercises with the French Foreign Legion in 2023.

== Notable alumni ==
- Thomas Sankara, 1st President of Burkina Faso (1983–1987)
- Michael Randrianirina, Colonel and President of Madagascar (2025–present)
- Général de Brigade Andrianaivo Raymond
- Général de corps d’armée Ismaël Mounibou
- Amiral Didier Ratsiraka
