= Sainte Marie Airport =

Airport in Madagascar

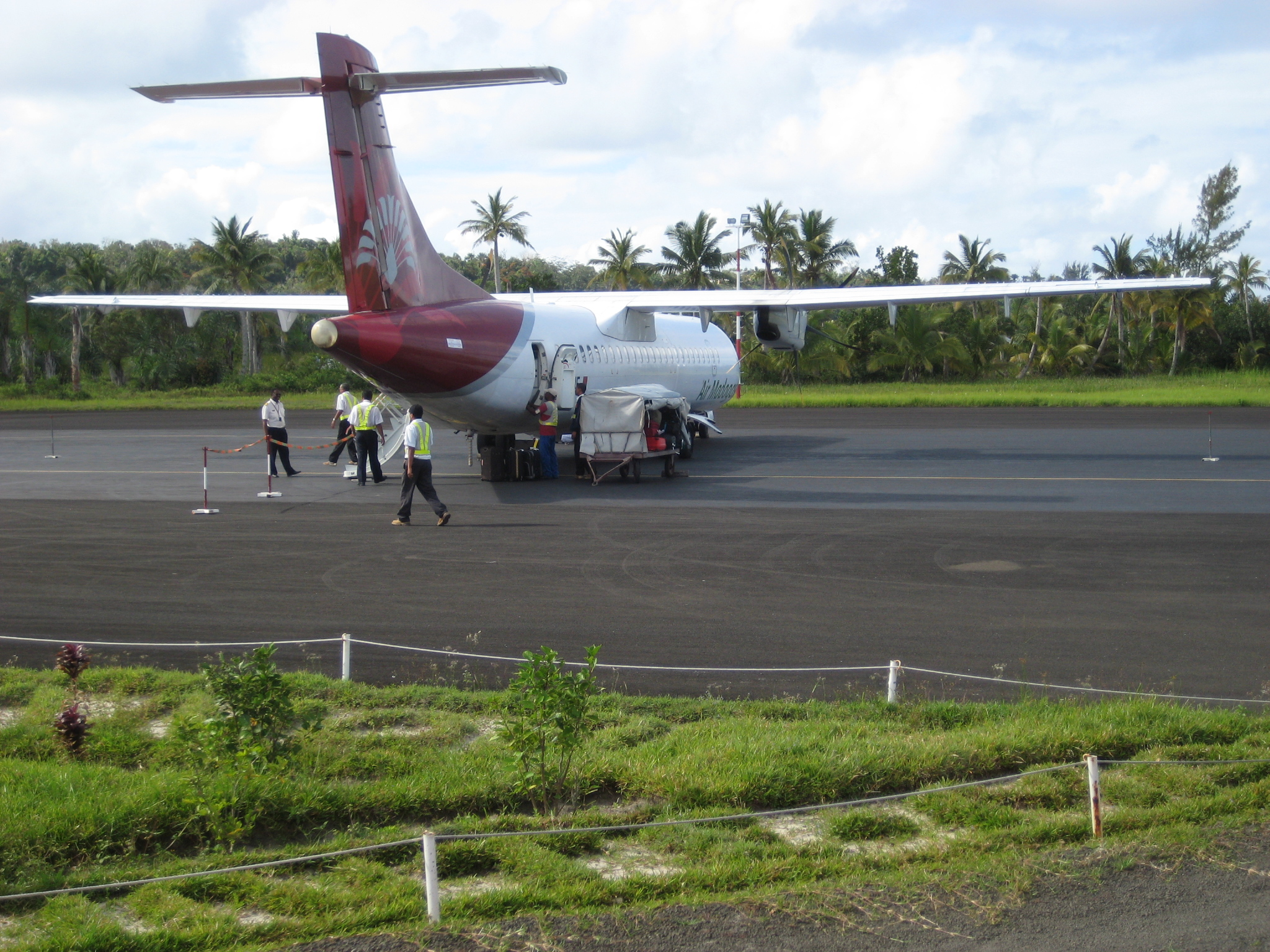
- IATA: SMS; ICAO: FMMS

Summary
- Airport type: Public
- Serves: Sainte Marie, Analanjirofo, Madagascar
- Elevation AMSL: 7 ft / 2 m
- Coordinates: 17°05′38″S 049°48′57″E

Map
- Location of Airport in Madagascar

Runways
Direction	Length		Surface
Direction	m	ft	Surface
01/19	1,475	4,840	Asphalt
- Source: DAFIF

Sainte Marie Airport (IATA: SMS, ICAO: FMMS) is an airport serving Sainte Marie, an island in the Analanjirofo Region of Madagascar.

== Airlines and destinations ==
Airlines	Destinations
Madagascar Airlines	Antananarivo, Toamasina
