= Council of Christian Churches in Madagascar =

- French: Conseil chrétien des Eglises à Madagascar; Malagasy: Fiombonan'ny Fiangonana Kristiana eto Madagasikara
- Formation: 1980; 46 years ago
- Headquarters: Antananarivo, Madagascar
- Members: Four churches

The Council of Christian Churches in Madagascar (FFKM) (French: Conseil chrétien des Eglises à Madagascar; Malagasy: Fiombonan'ny Fiangonana Kristiana eto Madagasikara) is an inter-church organization in Madagascar founded in 1980.

It comprises the four main religious denominations in the country: the Roman Catholic Church (EKAR), the Church of Jesus Christ in Madagascar (FJKM), the Malagasy Episcopal Church (Eklesia Episkopaly Malagasy/Anglican Church), and the Malagasy Lutheran Church (FLM).

The FFKM is headquartered in Antananarivo, and its member denominations represent more than 10 million members.

== Membership ==
To become a member church, a denomination "must confess the Lord Jesus Christ as God and only Saviour according to the scriptures."

== Leadership ==
The leadership of the Council of Christian Churches in Madagascar comprises elected representatives from member denominations, including a president, vice president, secretary, and treasurer. These leaders oversee the organization's activities, serve as spokespersons, and facilitate collaboration among churches. Committees may also be appointed to address specific areas of focus such as ecumenical relations and social justice. Overall, the leadership works towards promoting unity, dialogue, and collective action among Christian communities in Madagascar.

== See also ==
- World Council of Churches
