= CAPSAT =

Unit of the Madagascar Armed Forces

Administrative and Technical Services Personnel Administration Corps
- Corps d'Administration du Personnel des Services Administratifs et Techniques (French)
- Active: 2 December 2003 (officially) (Note: Possibly formed in 1975 and just re-named in 2003)─present
- Country: Madagascar
- Branch: Madagascar Armed Forces

Commanders
- Current commander: Colonel Michael Randrianirina
- Armed Forces chief: General Demosthene Pikulas

The Administrative and Technical Services Personnel Administration Corps (French: Corps d'Administration du Personnel des Services Administratifs et Techniques), abbreviated CAPSAT, is a politically powerful unit of the Madagascar Armed Forces.

== Function ==
CAPSAT is based in Soanierana, on the outskirts of Antananarivo. It is not a front-line combat unit but plays a central role in the management of military logistics, technical operations, and personnel administration.

== History ==
Due to hazy record keeping during socialist rule, the exact foundation date of CAPSAT is unknown. It is possible that the unit, or one that had a nearly identical function, was established as part of the reorganization of the armed forces during the creation of the Marxist-Leninist Democratic Republic of Madagascar in 1975; however, the first explicit mention of CAPSAT came in the re-organization of the army on 2 December 2003, when CAPSAT, or its predecessor that was renamed to CAPSAT, was reorganized into the new army of the Third Republic of Madagascar.

CAPSAT has been a very powerful group in Madagascar for several decades mostly due to connections with local business elites and sections of the gendarmerie, but also because CAPSAT officers were frequently promoted into higher leadership positions, thus spreading the unit's influence over the entire army.

Due to CAPSAT's role they have structural control over key army functions, namely logistics and salaries. Since it is CAPSAT that pays army personnel, they've gained a reputation as the kingmaker of Malagasy politics.

Their mutiny, led by Colonel Noël Rakotonandrasana, during the 2009 Malagasy political crisis caused the resignation of President Marc Ravalomanana and the installation of Antananarivo mayor Andry Rajoelina as President of the "High Transitional Authority of Madagascar" after a coup d'état. CAPSAT had been staunch allies of Rajoelina, who in turn tried and failed to install loyalists and allies into CAPSAT. Due to this attempted infiltration, starting from 2020–2021 CAPSAT and Rajoelina had a falling out, and CAPSAT "questioned whether [their and Rajoelina's] interests align."

CAPSAT launched a coup d'état on 14 October 2025 and its current commander, Colonel Michael Randrianirina, became interim President of Madagascar, although this was disputed by Andry Rajoelina who fled the country and is derelict of his duties.
