= Climate change in Madagascar =

Effects and responses to climate change in the African island country

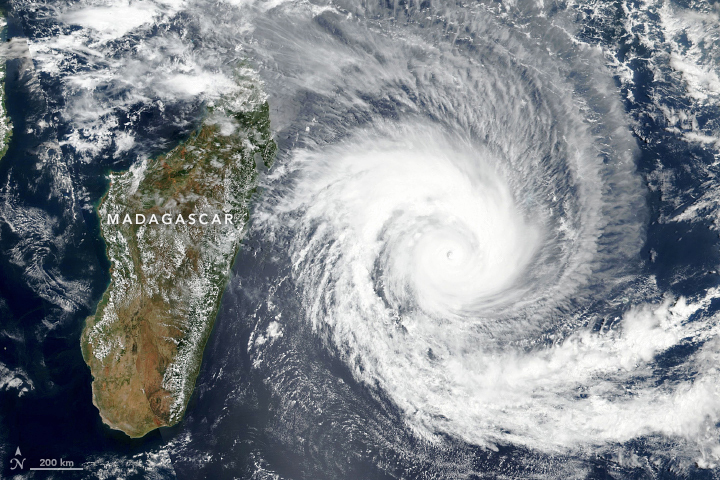
Satellite image of Cyclone Batsirai approaching Madagascar. Tropical cyclones are set to become more intense in the country due to climate change.

Climate change is a significant threat to Madagascar's environment and people. Climate change has raised temperatures, made the dry season longer and has resulted in more intense tropical storms. The country's unique ecosystems, animal and plant life are being impacted.

Climate change is projected to drive declines in coral reefs and forest habitats, and threaten native species such as lemurs. The human population is highly vulnerable due to severe impacts on water and agriculture, with implications for food security. Infectious diseases are also expected to increase. Madagascar is a signatory to the Paris Agreement and has set out goals for climate change adaptation, although their implementation faces challenges due to country's relative poverty.

== Effects on the natural environment ==
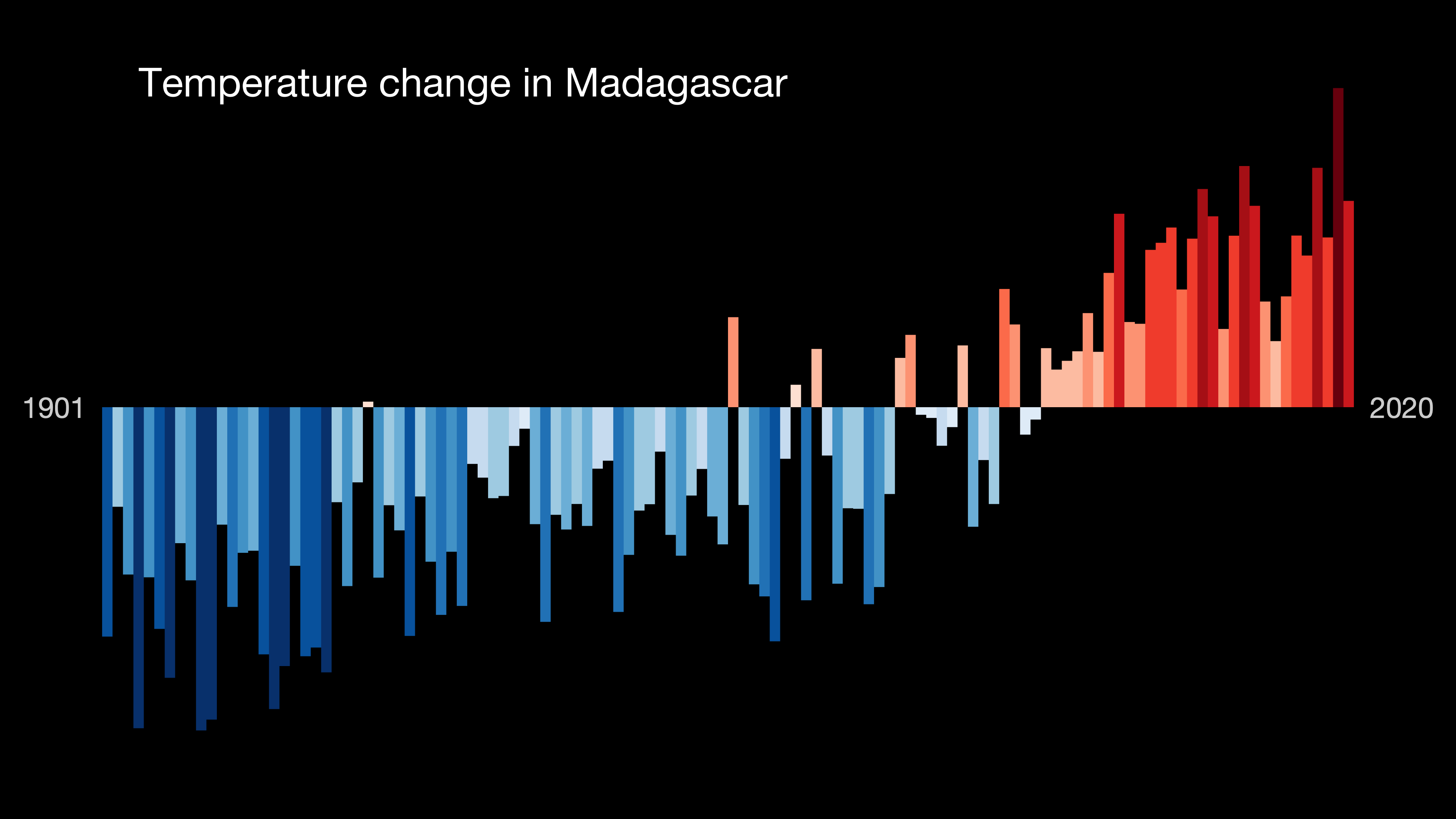
Temperature change in Madagascar, 1901 to 2020

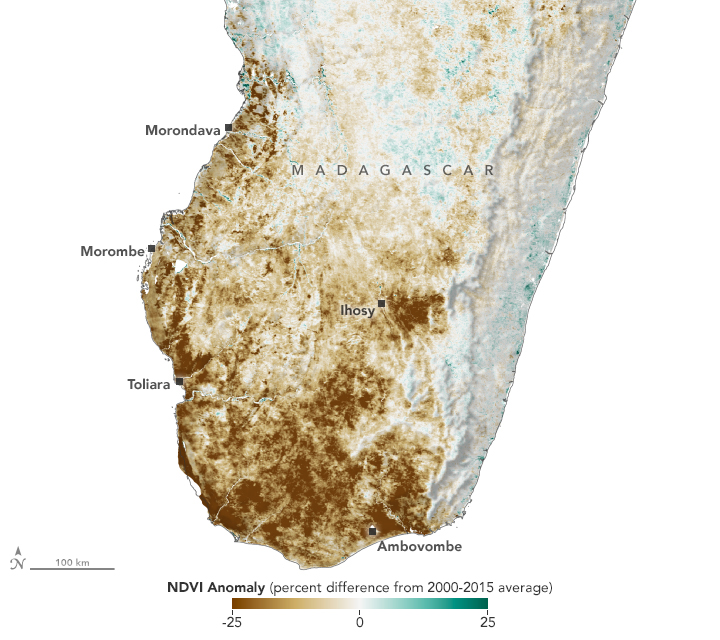
Droughts in Madagascar are being made more likely due to climate change.

Climate change is projected to lead to an increase in temperatures for the entire island of Madagascar in the 21st century. A 2008 estimate using a regional climate model put the increase at 1.1–2.6 °C, varying depending on topography, for the period 2046–2065. The south of Madagascar is projected to warm the most, with the north and coastal areas warming the least. This would have significant impacts for the fragmented eastern forests. Madagascar has the highest risk of cyclones in Africa, experiencing three to four per year. Cyclones are expected to become more intense due to climate change but less frequent, greatly impacting the country and increasing flood risk. By 2018, the number of violent cyclones with superior wind speeds up to 150 km/h doubled in the prior 25 years. Madagascar's dry season is becoming longer. Vegetation cover correlates strongly with the El Niño–Southern Oscillation, with this relationship indicating climate change is likely to further degrade Madagascar's environment.

Madagascar's unique wildlife and flora are threatened by the changing climate. In a 2008 study, suitable climatic space for nearly all 80 endemic Malagasy plant species was impacted by climate change. Madagascar's forests are projected to be greatly affected during the 21st century. Lemurs are also likely to be impacted, with expected severe shifts in species distribution and by the spread of parasites across a wider distribution with warmer temperatures. Lemur survivorship and fruit production declined in Ranomafana National Park between 1960–1985 and 1986–2005, along with winters becoming drier in the park, and Montane-endemic amphibians and reptiles are threatened by higher temperatures. Suitable eastern rainforest habitat for ruffed lemurs is projected to decline considerably due to the interacting impacts of climate change and deforestation in Madagascar. The fecundity and reproduction of the Milne-Edwards's sifaka is significantly impacted by changes in precipitation and increased cyclones. Coral reefs in Madagascar are likely to decline in the 21st century due to climate change, although deforestation is thought to have a greater impact. Coral bleaching events are projected to increase and cyclones damage them directly, leading to declines in fish populations and increasing coastal erosion.

Present (left) and predicted future (right) Köppen climate classification maps of Madagascar. The projection on the right is under the most intense climate change scenario. Mid-range scenarios are currently considered more likely

== Effects on people ==
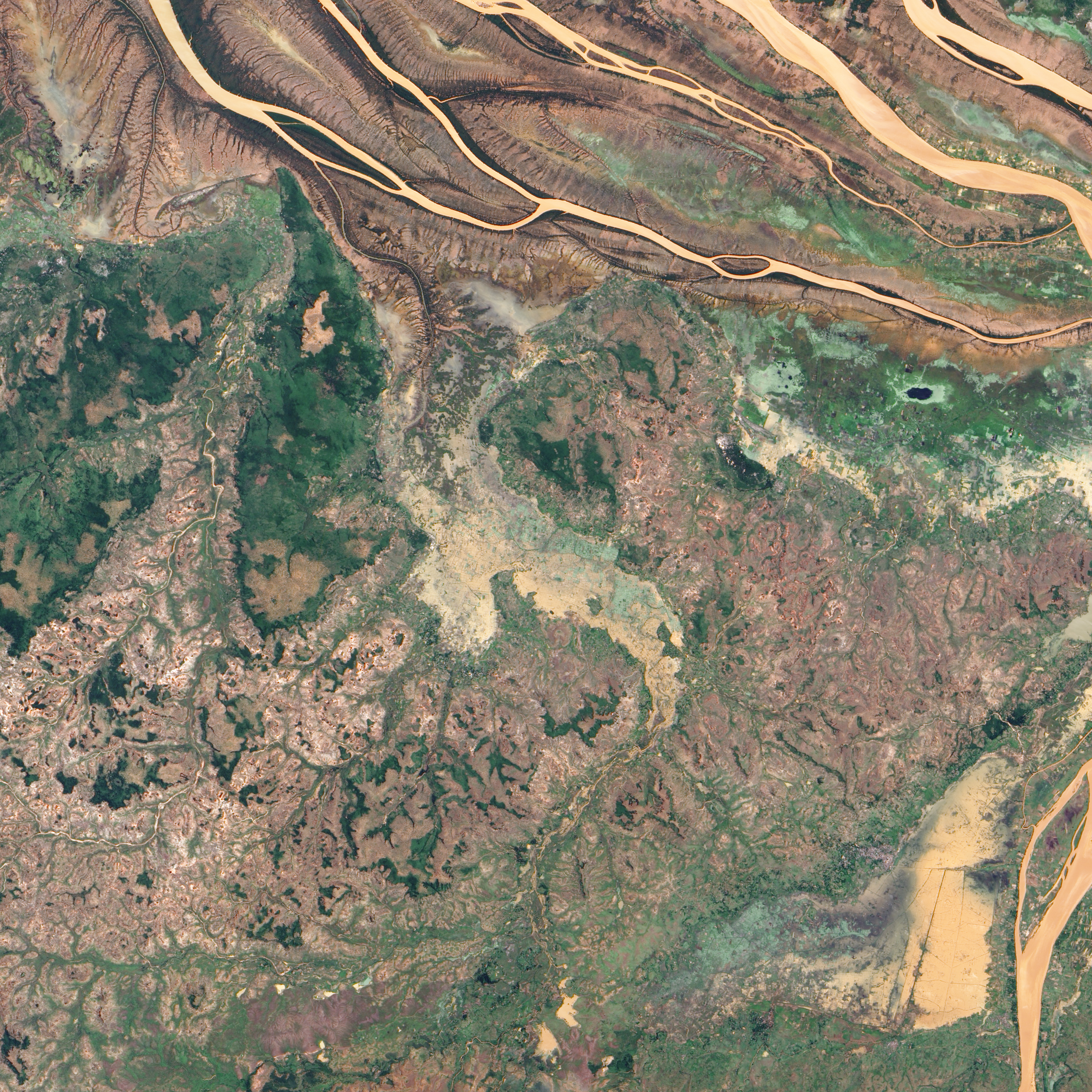
Flooding of agricultural fields (pictured in 2010 near the Betsiboka River) is increasing in Madagascar due to climate change.

Agriculture in Madagascar is being affected by climate change, with smallholder farmers extremely vulnerable to its impacts. The effects of climate change on agriculture, such as increased drought, greatly threatens Madagascar's population, 80% of which relies on agriculture for livelihood. Heating and flooding has been proposed as driving a decline in farm production between 1990 and 2015. The severe 2021–2022 Madagascar famine, which followed the worst drought in four decades, has been linked to climate change by the United Nations and media commentators, although an attribution study found that "while climate change may have slightly increased the likelihood of this reduced rainfall [over 2019–21], the effect is not statistically significant", with poverty, poor infrastructure and high dependence on rain-fed agriculture being primary factors.

Water supply in Madagascar is poor, with a 2018 estimate suggesting that 66% of the population in rural areas and 49% in urban areas lack access to drinking water. Madagascar was facing one of the world's most severe water crises as of 2021 due to poor water management infrastructure, deforestation, erosion and saltwater intrusion. Decreases in annual rainfall, increased evapotranspiration and sea level rise are projected to further reduce water availability across much of the country. This includes the capital Antananarivo, where water availability may not be able to meet demand by 2050. Water in Southern Madagascar, where groundwater is the primary water source during the dry season, are likely to also be severely affected as water becomes further limited.

Climate change also has significant implications for health in Madagascar. The incidence of respiratory infections and diarrhea is increasing and these, along with malaria and malnutrition, are expected to increase in the 21st century due to climate change. Cholera outbreaks and malnutrition have been linked to climate change. Urban infrastructure is also affected as trails are washed away by cyclones, roads are impassable, and schools are damaged.

== Mitigation and adaptation ==
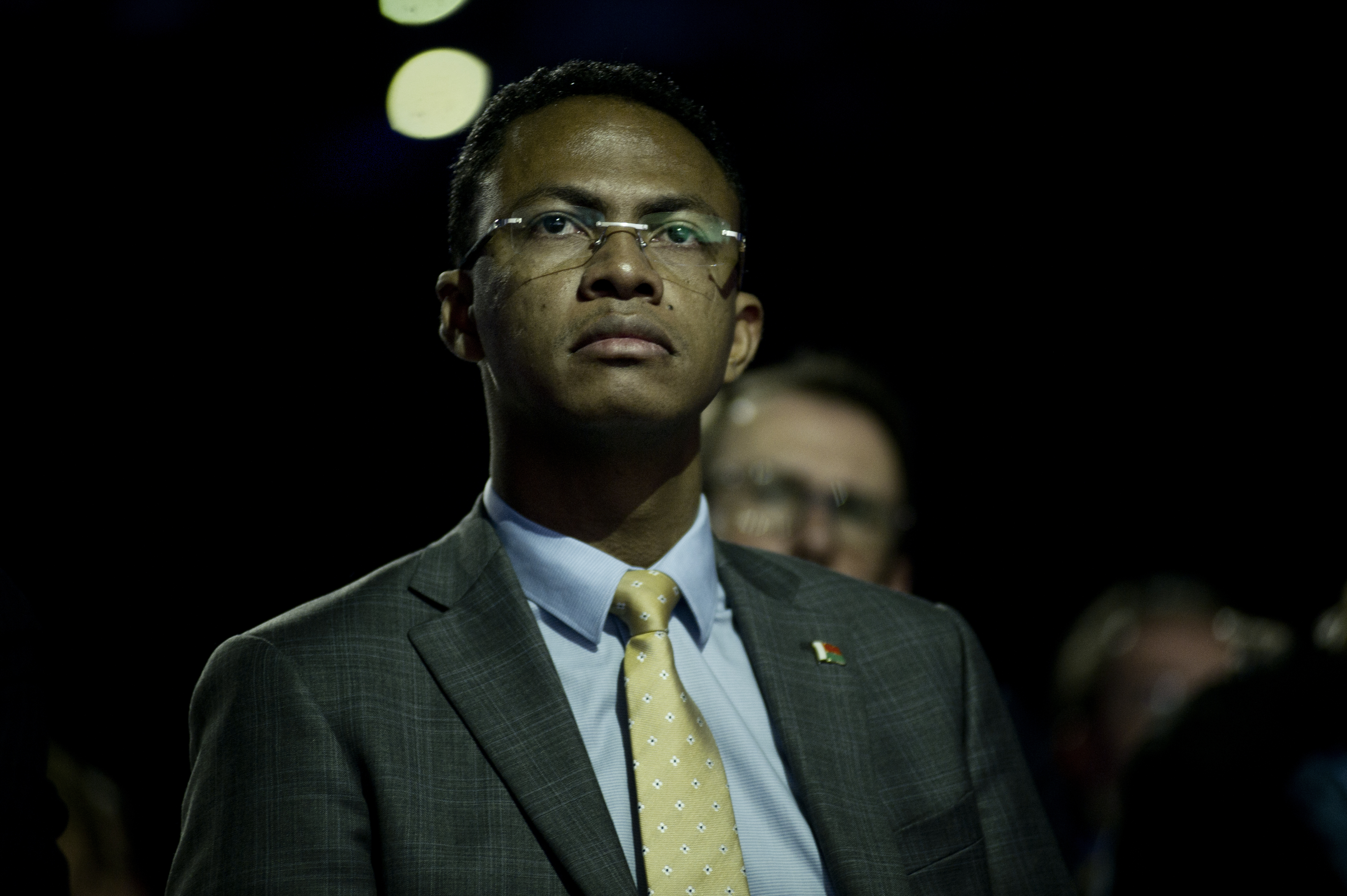
Minister of Environment, Ecology, Sea and Forests Ralava Beboarimisa at the 2015 United Nations Climate Change Conference

Madagascar is a signatory to the Paris Agreement. On average, each Malagasy emits less than 2 tonnes of greenhouse gas (GHG) a year, compared to the global average of over 6 tonnes. Biomass is the primary source of energy, and this use of firewood and charcoal for cooking is contributing to deforestation. Only a fraction of the population have access to electricity, but some solar power has been built, such as Ambatolampy Solar Power Station.

In its nationally determined contribution, with the help of reforestation, the country aims to absorb more GHG than it emits in 2030. President Andry Rajoelina urged tougher international action on climate change at the 2021 United Nations General Assembly:

Madagascar finds itself a victim of climate change. There are recurrent waves of drought in the south. The water sources dry up and all the means of subsistence become almost impossible. My compatriots in the south are bearing the weight of climate change which they did not participate in creating.

— President Andry Rajoelina

Madagascar is a poor country, and climate change adaptation is costly. Protecting the country's unique ecosystems is considered a central adaptation strategy. Proposed measures using conservation in Madagascar include expanding protected areas and generating income by selling carbon offsets for reducing emissions from deforestation and forest degradation (REDD+). However, as of 2021 a government strategy for REDD+ was unclear, as it banned the sale of all carbon credits and moved to nationalise carbon ownership. In 2022, the country was considering selling 1.8 billion tonnes of carbon offsets under the World Bank's Forest Carbon Partnership Facility. Mangrove restoration is another proposed strategy to adapt to sea level rise. Building climate resilience in the population can be achieved through reducing poverty and improving water access and infrastructure, particularly in rural areas. At COP26, environment minister Baomiavotse Vahinala Raharinirina called for $100bn in climate finance from rich countries to poorer countries like Madagascar to implement adaptation measures, highlighting a proposed water pipeline from the north to the south of the island requiring funding.

== See also ==
- Climate of Madagascar
- Food security in Madagascar
- Climate change and gender in Madagascar
- Climate change in Africa
