= Unima =

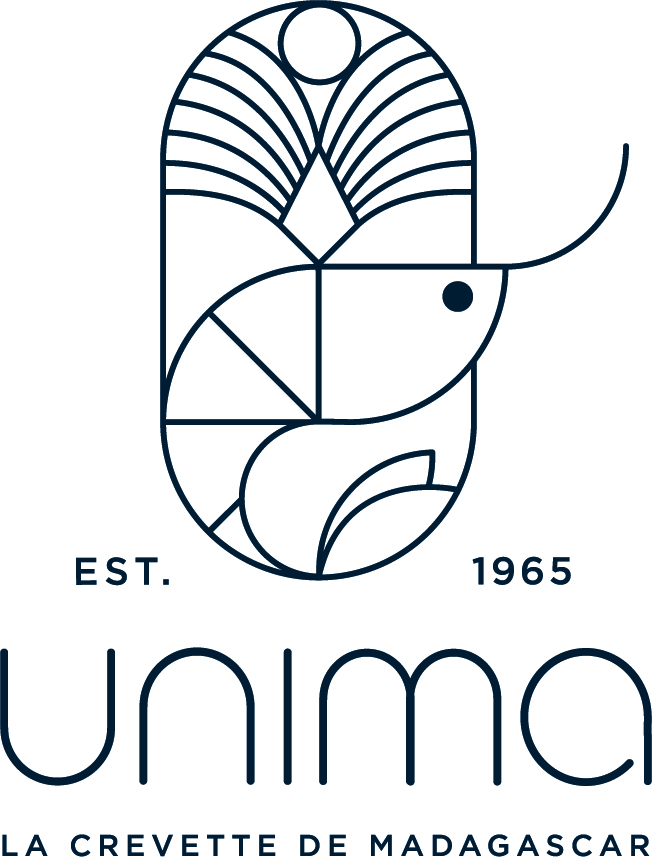
- Visuel de Unima
- Industry: Food
- Founded: Madagascar 1965; 61 years ago
- Founder: Aziz Hassam Ismail
- Headquarters: Luxembourg, Luxembourg
- Key people: Amyne H. Ismail (President and CEO)
- Products: Seafood (shrimps)
- Website: unima.com

Unima is a company specialized in the fishing and production of shrimps, with a focus on aquaculture farming. Unima is headquartered in Luxembourg, and operates in Madagascar. Amyne H. Ismail has been the president and CEO of Unima since 2014. The company operates several fishing vessels and processing plants in Madagascar and exports its products to international markets.

== Background ==
Unima was founded by Aziz Hassam Ismail in 1965. In 1973, he acquired the modest shrimp-fishing operations of the small company Les Pêcheries de Nossi-Bé. During the 1990s, Unima launched Aqualma, 1,800 acres of aquaculture basins, and developed domesticated specific pathogen-free (SPF) broodstock of black tiger shrimp (Penaeus monodon).

In 1998, Amyne H. Ismail, son of Aziz Hassam Ismail, became CEO of Unima. Under his leadership, Unima turned into a fully-integrated shrimp production group, including a breeding and broodstock selection center, a larvae to post-larvae center, a software development company, a conditioning center (in France), and a high-quality fish-food factory (in La Réunion).

In 2012, Unima started distribution in China. In 2012, Unima was hit by the white spot syndrome and overhauled its production process.

In 2019, the Indian government authorized Aqualma to supply SPF black tiger broodstock to Indian producers to relaunch its domestic production of black tigers.

== Quality, environmental and social commitments ==
Unima's shrimp became the first non-European food product to be acknowledged under the French quality Label Rouge. They also obtained the Ikizukuri certification in Japan, and are certified organic by the European Union.

Since 2006, Unima has been involved with UNICEF’s WASH program, and working with WWF in Madagascar to implement a Biodiversity Action Plan since 2007. The company has planted over 1 million mangrove trees and developed fields of cashew (Verama). Unima also applies the principles of the FAO code of conduct for Responsible Fishing.

Besides, Unima pioneered carbon accounting, as one of the first companies in the world to apply the method developed by Jean-Marc Jancovici in the early 2000s. This project was supported by the French Development Agency and the Malagasy Ministry of Agriculture, Livestock and Fisheries.

In 2016, the company's aquaculture farm Aqualma in Mahajamba was the first in Africa to be awarded Aquaculture Stewardship Council certification.

== See also ==
- Aquaculture in Madagascar
- Shrimp farming
