= Agriculture in Madagascar =

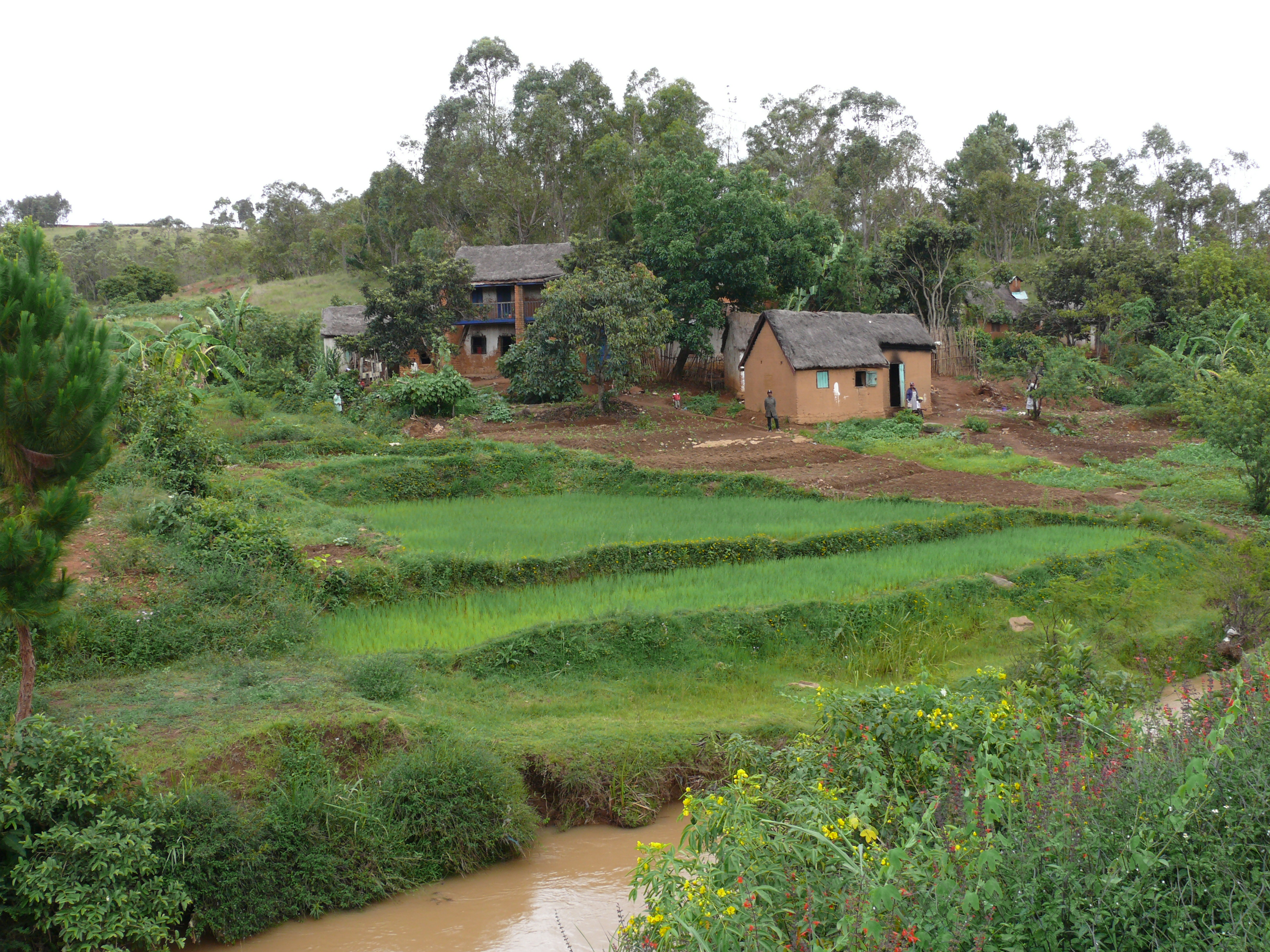
Rice cultivation has great importance for both subsistence and cash-crop farming in Madagascar.

Agriculture employs the majority of Madagascar's population. Mainly involving smallholders, agriculture has seen different levels of state organisation, shifting from state control to a liberalized sector.

Rice is the main produce and main export crop of Madagascar. It is mainly planted in a terraced paddy system in the central highlands. Other major subsistence crops include cassava, corn, and sweet potato, while coffee, cloves, vanilla and other cash crops are exported.

Among livestock, zebu account for most of the cattle, while pigs, sheep and poultry are also raised. Fishing is popular, and aquaculture has grown in importance.

Madagascar has seen high rates of deforestation, and the illegal extraction of highly valued timber species such as mahogany, ebony, and rosewood threatens native stands. The traditional slash-and-burn agriculture (tavy) together with population growth put increasing pressure on the native and very diverse flora of Madagascar.

== Production ==
Madagascar produced, in 2018:

- 4 million tons of rice;
- 3.1 million tons of sugarcane;
- 2.5 million tons of cassava;
- 1 million tons of sweet potato;
- 388 thousand tons of vegetable;
- 383 thousand tons of banana;
- 300 thousand tons of mango (including mangosteen and guava);
- 257 thousand tons of potato;
- 230 thousand tons of taro;
- 215 thousand tons of maize;
- 93 thousand tons of pineapple;
- 86 thousand tons of beans;
- 83 thousand tons of orange;
- 73 thousand tons of coconut;

In addition to smaller productions of other agricultural products, like coffee (57 thousand tons), clove (23 thousand tons), cocoa (11 thousand tons), cashew (7 thousand tons) and vanilla (3 thousand tons).

== Seasons and geography ==
Agriculture in Madagascar is heavily influenced by the island's rainfall, which is generally abundant on the whole East coast, decreases sharply on the highlands, and falls to less than 500 mm per year in the South and South-West. The main growing season starts with the first rains in October – November. The cropping calendar greatly varies from region to region, according to the very different climatic conditions, soils and altitude.

== Farming statistics ==
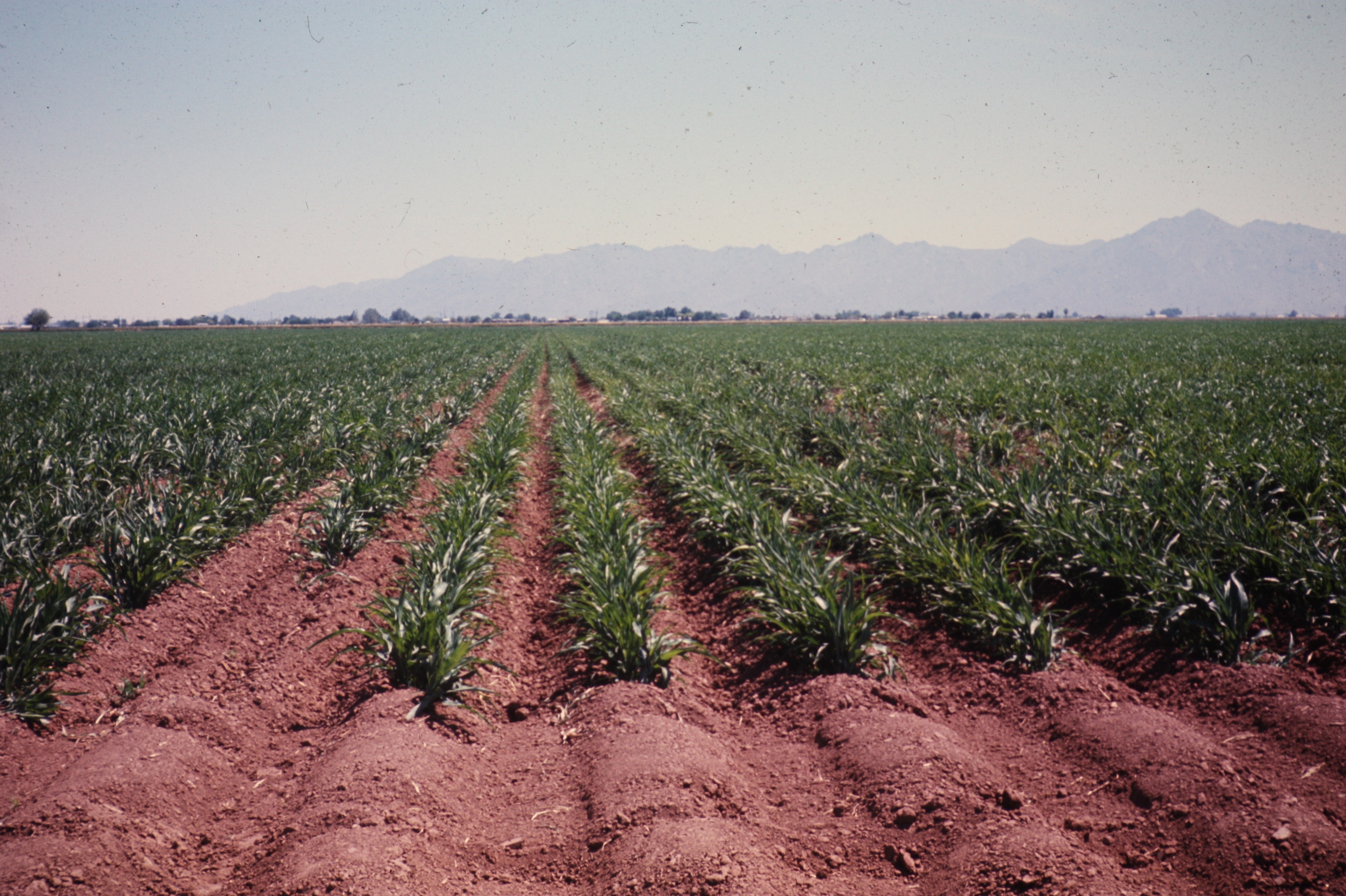
Sisal plantation in Madagascar's south, in the 1970s

There are 2,4 million farms of which the large majority are smallholders. This sector is characterized by farms not exceeding 1,3 hectares on average, fragmented (which hampers mechanization), with a large variety of crops, extensive practices, traditional varieties, limited equipment and infrastructures and poor water control, producing barely enough to feed their families.

Agricultural production is not constrained by lack of cultivable land. In fact, out of the 41 million hectares of agricultural land, only 3.5 million hectares are cultivated annually. The remainder of the area is under pastures (37.3 million ha) and forest (13 million ha). Irrigation would be possible over 1.5 million hectares of which about 1.1 million are somehow irrigated, with wide areas needing rehabilitation and investments

Food crop production is the most important agriculture sub-sector accounting for around 75 percent of the cultivated area (2009). Rice is the staple food, covering 1.34 million hectares throughout the country – with the exception of some semi-arid areas in the South and in the South-West – under both rain-fed and irrigated systems. Other food crops include maize (mainly grown in the South and Central-East regions), cassava, sorghum (in the South), beans, groundnut, sweet potatoes and a wide variety of vegetables. Cassava is an important component of the smallholder's risk reduction strategy because it is drought tolerant and resistant to disease. Cassava, sweet potato and maize are the main source of calories in the lean season (from September to January). Groundnut is cultivated on sandy soils in most locations and makes an important contribution to household diet and income. The main cash crops are cotton, vanilla, coffee, litchi, pepper, tobacco, groundnut, sugar cane, sisal, clove and ylang-ylang.

In general, levels of production and revenue of smallholders remain low due to a combination of multiple negative factors including land tenure insecurity, weak organisation of the agricultural filières, low intensity inputs use, no mechanization, and low soil productivity due to land degradation (especially erosion in the highlands). Nevertheless, rice production has increased from 2.4 million tons in 1990 to 4.0 million tons in 2009 thanks to the increase of both cultivated area (15 percent) and yields (40 percent).

== Shifting cultivation ==
Traditional farming methods vary from one ethnic group or location to another, according to population density, climate, water supply. The most intensive form of cultivation is practiced among the Betsileo and Merina groups of the central highlands, where population densities are the highest. At the other extreme are the extensive slash-and-burn methods of brush clearing and shifting cultivation in the south and the east.

In the forested areas of the eastern coast, the Betsimisaraka and Tanala peoples also practice irrigated rice culture where possible. The dominant form of land use, however, is shifting cultivation by the slash-and-burn method, known as tavy. The smaller trees and brush are cut down and left to dry, then burned just before the rainy season. The cleared area is usually planted with mountain rice and corn. After two or three years of cultivation, the fields are usually left fallow and are gradually covered by secondary vegetation known as savoka. After ten or twenty years, the area may be cultivated again.

Because the slash-and-burn method destroys the forest and other vegetation cover, and promotes erosion, it has been declared illegal. Government assistance is offered to those cultivators who prepare rice paddies instead, and those practicing tavy are fined or, in extreme cases, imprisoned. Despite the penalties, and much to the chagrin of forestry agents, tavy continues to be practiced. Even those who cultivate wet paddies often practice tavy on the side. The crop cycle for tavy is shorter than for irrigated rice, and generations of experience have taught that it is one of the few forms of insurance against the droughts that occur about every three years. Moreover, the precipitous slopes and heavy, irregular rains make it difficult to maintain affordable and controllable irrigation systems.

A similar system of shifting cultivation is practiced in the arid, sparsely populated regions of the extreme south and southwest. The dry brush or grassland is burned off, and drought-resistant sorghum or corn is sown in the ashes. In the Antandroy and some Mahafaly areas, however, the main staples of subsistence--cassava, corn, beans, and sorghum—are also grown around the villages in permanent fields enclosed by hedges.

Dry-season cultivation in empty streambeds is practiced largely on the western coast and in the southwest and is called baiboho. The crops are sown after the last rising of the waters during the rainy seasons, and after the harvest fresh alluvial deposits naturally replenish the soil. Lima beans (also known as Cape peas) are raised by this system on the Mangoky River system delta, along with tobacco and a number of newer crops.

== Types of produce ==
=== Rice ===
The Betsileo are probably the most efficient traditional rice farmers. They construct rice paddies on narrow terraces ascending the sides of steep valleys in the southern portion of the central highlands, creating an intricate landscape reminiscent of Indonesia. The irrigation systems use all available water, which flows through narrow canals for considerable distances. Some rice paddies cover no more than a few square meters. Only those surfaces that cannot be irrigated are planted in dryland crops.

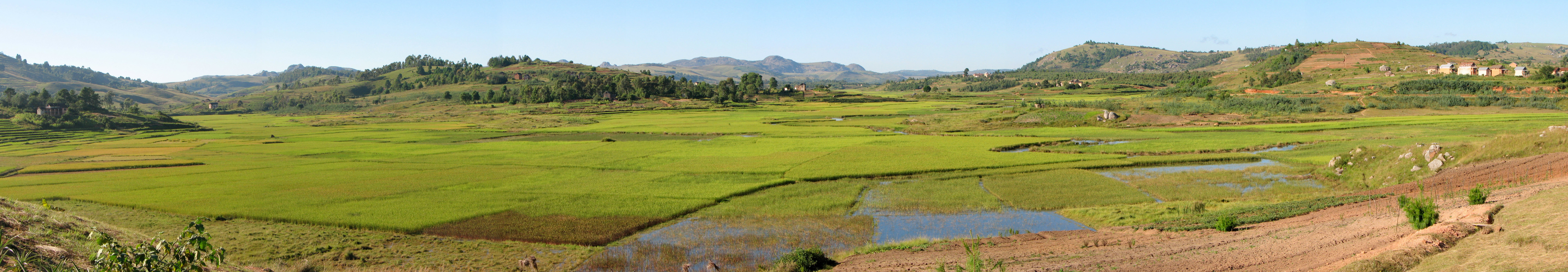
Irrigated rice fields characterise much of the central highlands of Madagascar.

In parts of the central highlands two rice crops a year can be grown, but not on the same plot. The Betsileo use a variety of local species that can be sown at different times, employing irrigation to grow some varieties in the dry season and waiting for the rainy season to plant others. The fields surrounding the typical Betsileo village often represent a checkerboard of tiny plots in different stages of the crop cycle.

The cultivation cycle begins with the repair of irrigation and drainage canals and plowing, which is performed with a longhandled spade or hoe. Manure or fertilizer is then spread over the field. If the supply of manure or artificial fertilizer is limited, only the seedbeds are fertilized. After fertilizing, family and neighbors join in a festive trampling of the fields, using cattle if available. Occasionally, trampling takes the place of plowing altogether. If the rice is to be sown broadcast, it may be done on the same day as trampling. In the more advanced areas, the seedlings are raised in protected seedbeds and transplanted later.

Rice-farming techniques among the Merina resemble those of the Betsileo but are usually less advanced and intensive. The Merina territory includes some areas where land is more plentiful, and broader areas permit less laborious means of irrigation and terracing. Although rice is still the dominant crop, more dryland species are grown than in the Betsileo region, and greater use is made of the hillsides and grasslands.

=== Livestock and fishing ===
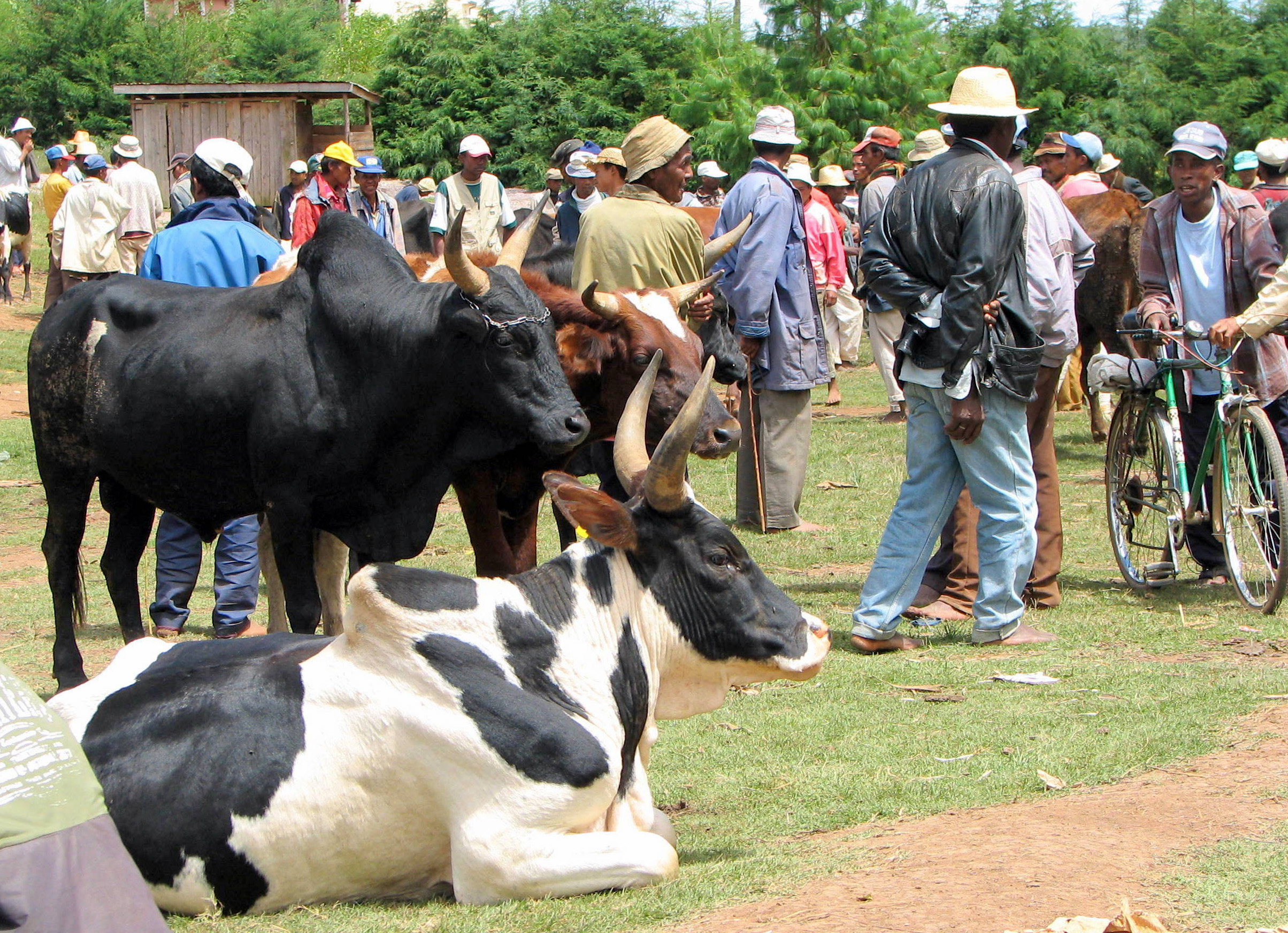
Zebus at the market of Ambatolampy

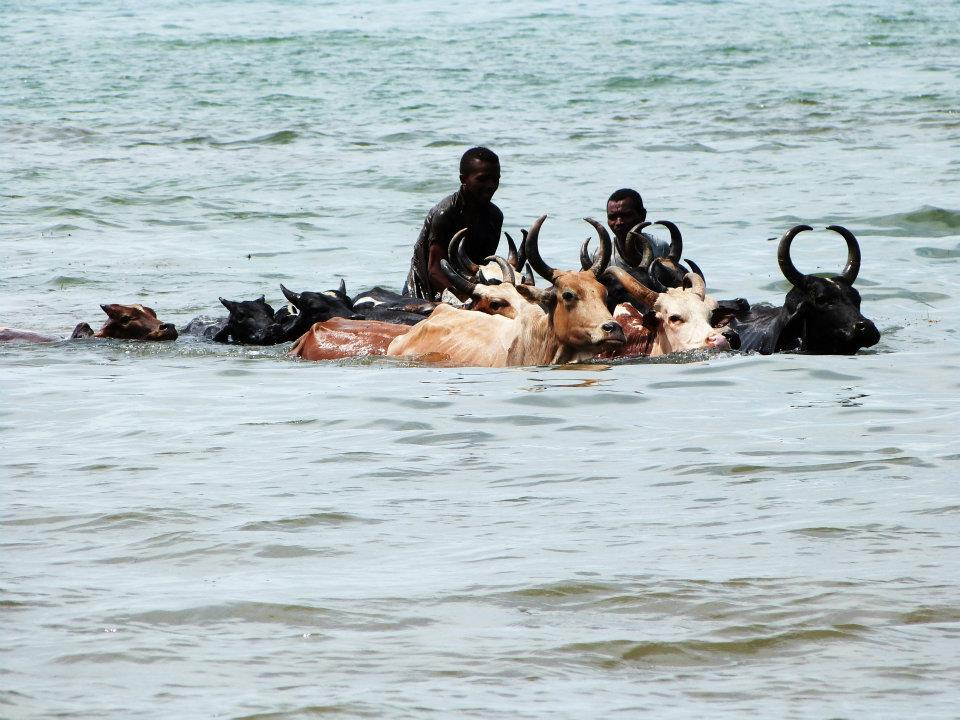
Malagasy men with Zebu in Ampasindava

Livestock is widespread, with about 60 percent of rural families depending on it for their income. Animal production is dominated by extensive livestock rearing, pigs and poultry. There is also a growing modern poultry industry around the main cities. In 2008, livestock accounted for 9.7 million of head of cattle, 2 million sheep and goats, 1.4 million pigs, and 26 million poultry. Overall, meat production was estimated at 251,000 tons; milk, 530,000 tons; and hen eggs, 19,000 tons. Zebus are also used for agricultural work for puddling rice fields as well as for ploughing and pulling carts. The high prevalence of disease is the main constraint undermining an increase of production. For example, Newcastle disease is a major ubiquitous problem for poultry, Anthrax affects cattle, and Classical and African swine fever affect pigs. Overall, the performances of this sub-sector are poor, with the exception of some filières (milk, small animals).

Both on the highlands and on the coasts, many farmers use fishing as a complement to agriculture and livestock, but it remains characterized by the use of rudimentary tools and materials and inadequate conservation. Madagascar has enormous potential in the fisheries sector (notably along its western coast in the province of Toliara). There is also a good potential for the development of shrimps and prawns rising and for freshwater aquaculture (mainly for common carp and tilapia) in paddy fields, ponds and cages. In 2008, captures of fishery and aquaculture production totalled 130,000 tons About 35,000 tons of fishery products are exported every year. More than 50 percent are exported toward the European countries, the rest, toward Japan, Mauritius and some Asian countries.

The traditional livestock-raising peoples are the Bara, Sakalava, and other groups of the south and the west, where almost every family owns some zebu cattle. The common practice is to allow the animals to graze almost at will, and the farmers take few precautions against the popular custom of cattle stealing. These farmers are also accustomed to burning off the dry grass to promote the growth of new vegetation for animal feed. The cattle generally are slaughtered only for ceremonial occasions, but these are so frequent that the per capita meat consumption among the cattle herders is very high.

Fishing is popular as a sideline by farmers who supplement their farm produce with fish from freshwater rivers, lakes, and ponds. Perhaps two-thirds of the total yearly catch is consumed for subsistence; transportation costs to the capital make the price of marketed fish prohibitively expensive to other domestic consumers. The introduction of tilapia fish from the African mainland in the 1950s increased inland aquaculture. Many families, particularly in the central highlands, have established fish ponds to raise carp, black bass, or trout. The breeding of fish in rice fields, however, requires sophisticated water control and a strong guard against dynamiting, poisoning, and poaching, which remain chronic problems.

=== Timber ===
Extensive stands of ebony, rosewood and mahogany flourish on the East coast. In 2009, the timber cut was approximately 25 million cubic metres (880×10^{6} cu ft). Wood production is from natural forests and is almost entirely consumed locally for fuel and construction. Bush fires and illegal logging further exacerbate the loss of forest areas, which is estimated at the rate of 330,000 hectares (820,000 acres) per year.

=== Aquaculture ===
Aquaculture in Madagascar started to take off in the 1980s. The industry includes the cultivation of sea cucumbers, seaweed, fish and shrimp and is being used to stimulate the country's economy, increase the wages of fishermen and women, and improve the regions ocean water quality. Coastal regions of Madagascar are reliant on the Indian Ocean's marine resources as a source of food, income, and cultural identity.

== Policy and development ==
The 1984–85 agricultural census estimated that 8.7 million people live in the rural areas and that 65 percent of the active poption within these areas lives at the subsistence level. The census also noted that average farm size was 1.2 hectares, although irrigated rice plots in the central highlands were often 0.5 hectares. Only 5.2 percent (3,000,000 hectares (7,400,000 acres)) of the country's total land area of 58.2 million hectares is under cultivation; of this hectarage, less than 2 million hectares are permanently cultivated. Agriculture is critical to Madagascar's economy in that it provides nearly 80 percent of exports, constituting 33 percent of GDP in 1993, and in 1992 employed almost 80 percent of the labor force. Moreover, 50.7 percent (300,000 square kilometers) of the total landmass of 592,000 square kilometers supports livestock rearing, while 16 percent (484,000 hectares) of land under cultivation is irrigated.

=== State control of production ===
The government significantly reorganized the agricultural sector of the economy beginning in 1972. Shortly after Ratsiraka assumed power, the government announced that holdings in excess of 500 hectares would be turned over to landless families, and in 1975 it reported that 500,000 hectares of land had been processed under the program. The long-range strategy of the Ratsiraka regime was to create collective forms of farm management, but not necessarily of ownership. By the year 2000, some 72 percent of agricultural output was to come from farm cooperatives, 17 percent from state farms, and only 10 percent from privately managed farms. Toward this end, the Ministry of Agricultural Production coordinated with more than seventy parastatal agencies in the areas of land development, agricultural extension, research, and marketing activities. However, these socialist-inspired rural development policies, which led to a severe decline in per capita agricultural output during the 1970s, were at the center of the liberalization policies of the 1980s and the structural adjustment demands of the IMF and the World Bank.

The evolution of rice production—the main staple food and the dominant crop—offers insight into some problems associated with agricultural production that were compounded by the Ratsiraka years. Rice production grew by less than 1 percent per year during the 1970–79 period, despite the expansion of the cultivated paddy area by more than 3 percent per year. Moreover, the share of rice available for marketing in the rapidly growing urban areas declined from 16 or 17 percent of the total crop in the early 1970s to about 11 or 12 percent during the latter part of the decade. As a result, Madagascar became a net importer of rice beginning in 1972, and by 1982 was importing nearly 200,000 tons per year—about 10 percent of the total domestic crop and about equal to the demand from urban customers.

The inefficient system of agricultural supply and marketing, which since 1972 increasingly had been placed under direct state control, was a major factor inhibiting more efficient and expanded rice production. From 1973 to 1977, one major parastatal agency, the Association for the National Interest in Agricultural Products (Société d'Intérêt National des Produits Agricoles—SINPA), had a monopoly in collecting, importing, processing, and distributing a number of commodities, most notably rice. Corruption leading to shortages of rice in a number of areas caused a scandal in 1977, and the government was forced to take over direct responsibility for rice marketing. In 1982 SINPA maintained a large share in the distribution system for agricultural commodities; it subcontracted many smaller parastatal agencies to handle distribution in certain areas. The decreasing commercialization of rice and other commodities continued, however, suggesting that transportation bottlenecks and producer prices were undermining official distribution channels.

=== Liberalization ===
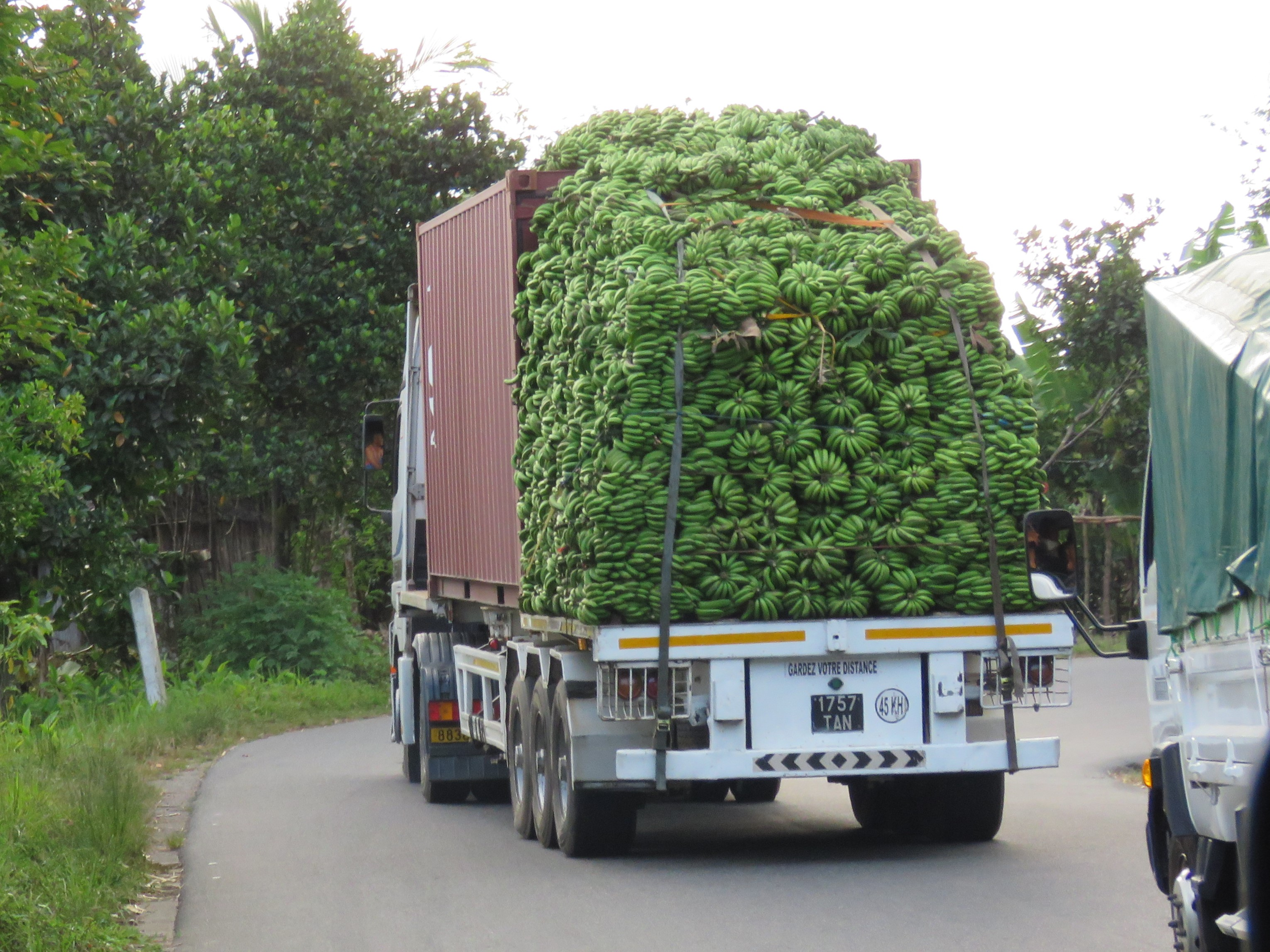
Transport of bananas (2018)

To promote domestic production and reduce foreign imports of rice, the Ratsiraka regime enacted a series of structural adjustment reforms during the 1980s. These included the removal of government subsidies on the consumer purchase price of rice in 1984 and the disbanding of the state marketing monopoly controlled by SINPA in 1985. Rice growers responded by moderately expanding production by 9.3 percent during the latter half of the 1980s from 2.18 million tons in 1985 to 2.38 million tons in 1989, and rice imports declined dramatically by 70 percent between 1985 and 1989. However, the Ratsiraka regime failed to restore self-sufficiency in rice production (estimated at between 2.8 million to 3.0 million tons), and rice imports rose again in 1990. In 1992 rice production occupied about two-thirds of the cultivated area and produced 40 percent of total agricultural income, including fishing, which was next with 19 percent, livestock raising, and forestry.

In February 1994, Cyclone Geralda hit Madagascar just as the rice harvesting was to start and had a serious impact on the self-sufficiency goal. In addition, the southern tip of Madagascar suffered from severe drought in late 1993, resulting in emergency assistance to 1 million people from the United Nations (UN) World Food Programme (WFP). This WFP aid was later transformed into a food-for-work program to encourage development.

Other food crops have witnessed small increases in production from 1985 to 1992. Cassava, the second major food crop in terms of area planted (almost everywhere on the island) and probably in quantity consumed, increased in production from 2.14 million tons in 1985 to 2.32 million tons in 1992. During this same period, corn production increased from 140,000 tons to 165,000 tons, sweet potato production increased from 450,000 tons to 487,000 tons, and bananas dropped slightly from 255,000 tons to 220,000 tons.

=== Export crops ===
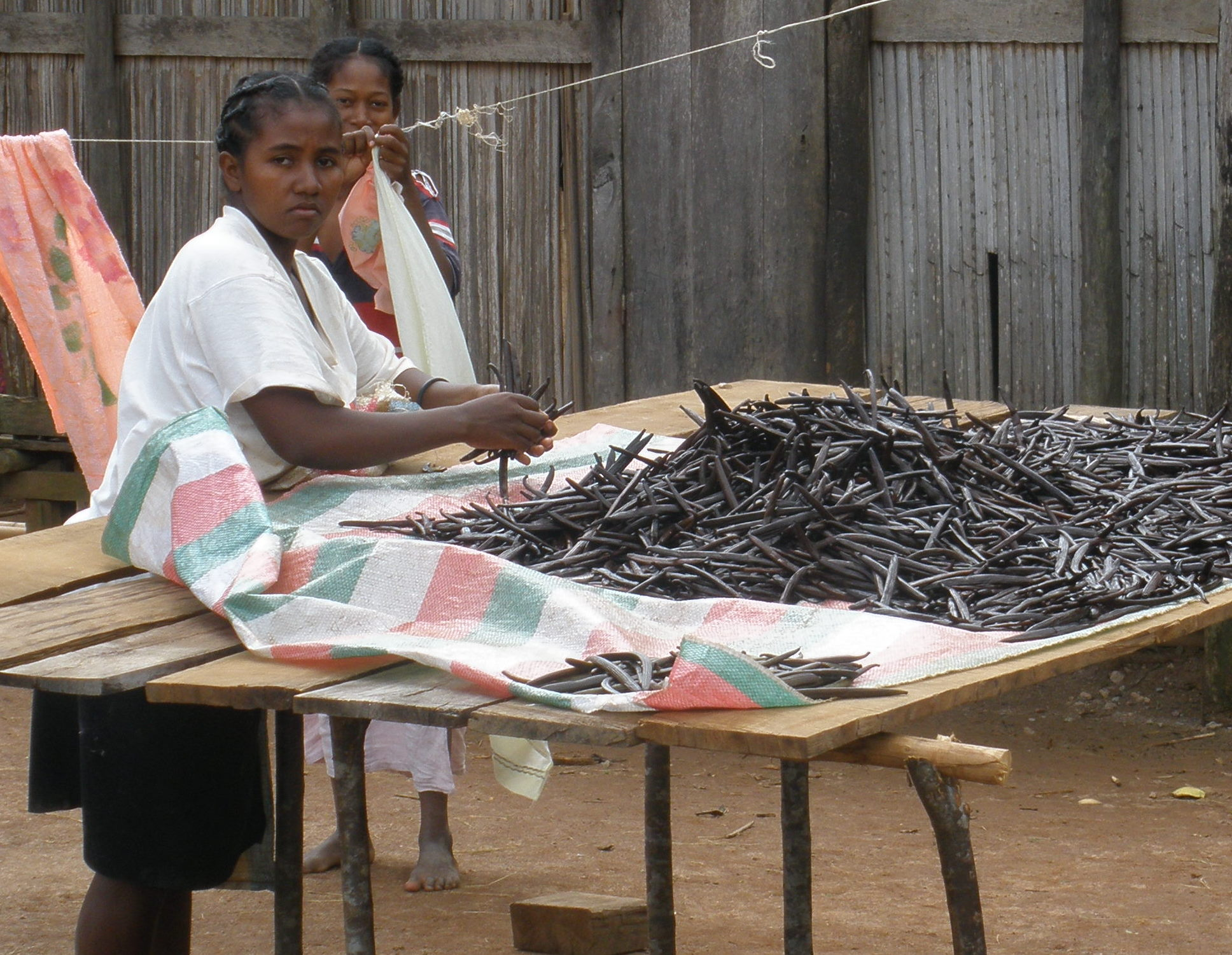
Vanilla is one of Madagascar's main export crops.

Several export crops are also important to Madagascar's economy. Coffee prices witnessed a boom during the 1980s, making coffee the leading export crop of the decade; in 1986 coffee earned a record profit of US$151 million. Prices within the coffee market gradually declined during the remainder of the 1980s, and earnings reached a low of US$28 million in 1991 although they rebounded to US$58 million in 1992. Cotton traditionally has been the second major export crop, but most output during the early 1980s was absorbed by the local textile industry. Although cotton output rose from 27,000 tons in 1987 to 46,000 tons in 1988, once again raising the possibility of significant export earnings, the combination of drought and a faltering agricultural extension service in the southwest contributed to a gradual decline in output to only 20,000 tons in 1992.

Two other export crops--cloves and vanilla—have also declined in importance from the 1980s to the 1990s. Indonesia, the primary importer of Malagasy cloves, temporarily halted purchases in 1983 as a result of sufficient domestic production, and left Madagascar with a huge surplus. A collapse in international prices for cloves in 1987, compounded by uncertain future markets and the normal cyclical nature of the crop, has led to a gradual decline in production from a high of 14,600 tons in 1991 to 7,500 tons in 1993. Similarly, the still state-regulated vanilla industry (state-regulated prices for coffee and cloves were abolished in 1988–89) found itself under considerable financial pressure after 1987 because Indonesia reentered the international market as a major producer and synthetic competitors emerged in the two major markets of the United States and France. As a result, vanilla production has declined from a high of 1,500 tons in 1988 and 1989 to only 700 tons in 1993. However, in recent years, there has been a resurgence of vanilla. Cacao is also a major export crop in the Ambanja region in the northwest.

As with other export crops that have experienced fluctuations over the decades, vanilla, which had seen a resurgence in the years prior, has encountered severe challenges during the 2024 growing season. The destruction wrought by Cyclone Gamane has been profound, with the vanilla plantations bearing the brunt of the storm's devastation. The significant damage inflicted by torrential rains and gale-force winds has not only flooded fields but also led to widespread loss of vanilla pods. Early estimates indicate a catastrophic reduction in yield, forecasting a harvest that might dip to a mere 1,000 tons—a figure that represents only about fifty percent of typical annual production levels. This unfortunate development coincides with a global increase in cocoa prices, yet the price of vanilla has remained notably low, hovering around $60 per kilogram. This current pricing is a stark contrast to the highs of $250 per kilogram observed merely two years ago, a discrepancy attributed to lingering effects of past oversupply. Market analysts project a market correction and stabilization by the year 2025.

=== Fisheries and livestock ===
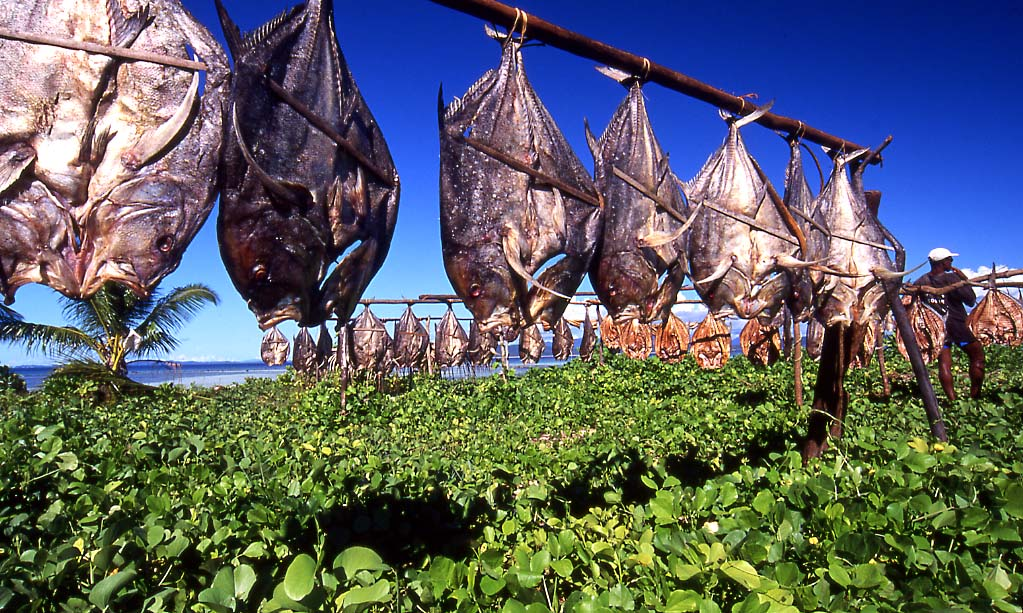
Fish being dried in the sun.

The fisheries sector, especially the export of shrimp, is the most rapidly growing area of the agricultural economy. This production is making up for lost revenues and potential structural decline within the ailing coffee, vanilla, and clove trade. Since 1988 total fish production has expanded nearly 23 percent from 92,966 tons to 114,370 tons in 1993. The export of shrimp constituted an extremely important portion of this production, providing export earnings of US$48 million in 1993. It is estimated by Aqualma, the major multinational corporation in the shrimp industry, that expansion into roughly 35,000 hectares of swampland on the country's west coast may allow for the expansion of production from the current 6,500 tons and US$40 million in revenues to nearly 75,000 tons and US$400 million in revenues by the end of the 1990s. The prospects are also good for promoting greater levels of fish cultivation in the rice paddies, and exports of other fish products, most notably crab, tuna, and lobster, have been rising.

Livestock production is limited in part because of traditional patterns of livestock ownership that have hampered commercialization. Beef exports in the early 1990s decreased because of poor government marketing practices, rundown slaughtering facilities, and inadequate veterinary services. Approximately 99 percent of cattle are zebu cattle. In 1990 the Food and Agriculture Organization of the UN estimated that Madagascar had 10.3 million cattle, 1.7 million sheep and goats, and some 21 million chickens.

== Environmental impact ==
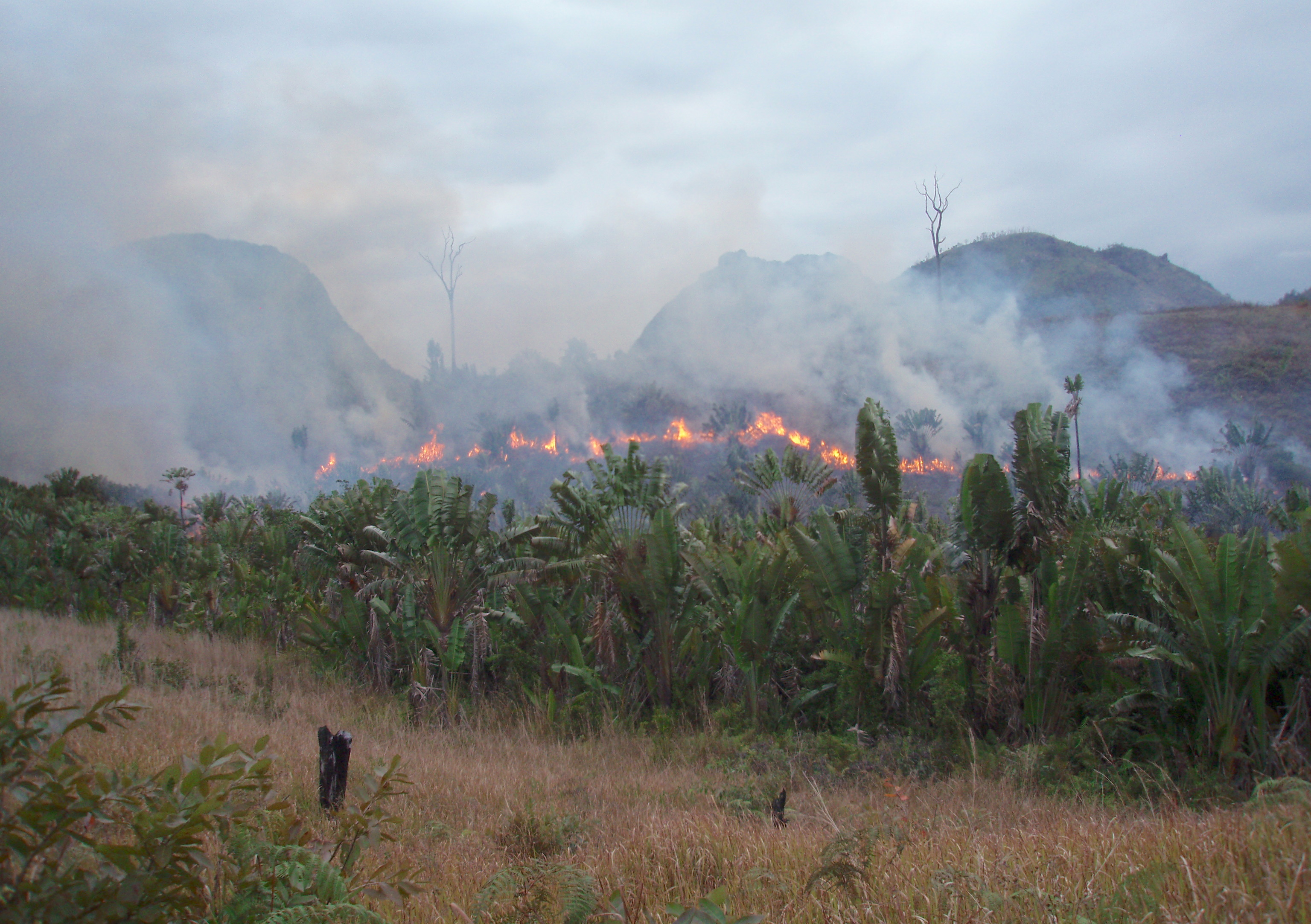
Slash-and-burn in the region west of Manantenina.

Most of the historical farming in Madagascar has been conducted by indigenous peoples. The French colonial period disturbed a very small percentage of land area, and even included some useful experiments in sustainable forestry. Slash-and-burn techniques, a component of some shifting cultivation systems have been practised by the inhabitants of Madagascar for centuries. As of 2006 some of the major agricultural products from slash-and-burn methods are wood, charcoal and grass for Zebu grazing. These practises have taken perhaps the greatest toll on land fertility since the end of French rule, mainly due to population growth pressures.

The Madagascar dry deciduous forests have been preserved generally better than the eastern rainforests or the high central plateau, presumably due to historically less population density and scarcity of water; moreover, the present day lack of road access further limits human access. There has been some slash-and-burn activity in the western dry forests, reducing forest cover and the soil nutrient content. Slash-and-burn is a method sometimes used by shifting cultivators to create short term yields from marginal soils. When practiced repeatedly, or without intervening fallow periods, the nutrient poor soils may be exhausted or eroded to an unproductive state. Further protection of Madagascar's forests would assist in preservation of these diverse ecosystems, which have a very high ratio of endemic organisms to total species. A switch to slash-and-char would considerably advance preservation, while the ensuing biochar would also greatly benefit the soil if returned to it while mixed with compostable biomass such as crop residues. This would lead to the creation of terra preta, a soil among the richest on the planet and the only one known to regenerate itself (although how this happens exactly is still a mystery). The nascent carbon trading market may further bring direct economical benefits for the operators, since charcoal is a prime sequester of carbon and burying it spread in small pieces, as terra preta requires, is a most efficient guarantee that it will remain harmless for many thousands of years.

== See also ==
- Agroecology
- Food Security in Madagascar
