= Julie Hanta Razafimanahaka =

Malagasy biologist

- Education: University of Antananarivo; University of East Anglia
- Occupation: Conservation biologist
- Known for: Director of a conservation nonprofit in Eastern Madagascar

Julie Hanta Razafimanahaka is a Malagasy conservation biologist. She has been the director of Madagasikara Voakajy, a conservation nonprofit operating in Eastern Madagascar, since 2011. She began her career as a bat researcher, from 2004 to 2007. In 2015, she was awarded the Young Women in Conservation Award by the International Congress for Conservation Biology.

== Biography ==
Julie Hanta Razafimanahaka first became interested in conservation at age 13, while she was camping at Andasibe National Park and encountered Indris lemurs. She says of the experience, "I loved the song of the Indri. This really inspired me, and was at the back of my mind as I continued my studies".

She began her work with Madagasikara Voakajy in 2003 as an intern, while studying at the University of Antananarivo in the Department of Water and Forests. While there, she traveled to Tsingy de Bemaraha National Park to study Triaenops menamena, a bat species endemic to Madagascar. She then obtained a Master of Science in Applied Ecology and Conservation from the University of East Anglia. She continued to move up the ranks of Madagasikara Voakajy as a project leader, project manager, and finally became director of the organization in 2011. There, she helps broker agreements between government entities, businesses, and local communities to create locally managed conservation areas and protect endangered species. As part of these efforts, she travels to local villages to educate the people there about conservation initiatives, focusing on the role women can have in supporting local conservation efforts. She says of her work, "In my opinion, Malagasy people would still like to conserve Madagascar’s biodiversity and understand the reasons why they need to do so, but most of us are quite desperate wondering if that would be feasible. This is why organizations like Madagasikara Voakajy have to step up, inspire, and demonstrate that this is possible".

== Awards and Distinctions ==
Julie Hanta Razafimanahaka has received many awards and distinctions. In 2007, she was recognized while at the University of East Anglia by the UK Government's Department for the Environment, Food and Rural Affairs as one of Madagascar's most promising conservation scientists and was granted funding for her MSc through the Darwin Initiative grant. In 2011, Julie was offered a place on the Kinship Conservation Fellows programme where she continued her work on the sustainable trade of endemic western Malagasy species. In 2014, she was awarded the Marsh Award for Terrestrial Conservation Leadership in 2014, and In August 2015, she was awarded the prestigious Young Women Conservation Biology Award from the Society for Conservation Biology.

She has been invited to speak at several important events such as the Bat Summit in Kenya, organized by Bat Conservation International.

== Publications ==
Julie Hanta Razafimanahaka has published several papers in the field of conservation biology.

- A.F. Kofoky, D. Andriafidison, F.H. Ratrimomanarivo, H.J. Razafimanahaka, D. Rakotondravony, P.A. Racey et R.K.B. Jenkins, « », Biodiversity and Conservation, vol. 16, 2007, p. 1039-1053
- N. Piludu, N. Dubos, H.J. Razafimanahaka, P. Razafindraibe, C.J. Randrianantoandro, et R.K.B. Jenkins. "Distribution, threats and conservation of a Critically Endangered amphibian (Mantella aurantiaca) in Eastern Madagascar", Herpetology Notes, vol. 8, 2015, p. 119-123.
- Jenkins, Richard KB, Aidan Keane, Andrinajoro R. Rakotoarivelo, Victor Rakotomboavonjy, Felicien H. Randrianandrianina, H. Julie Razafimanahaka, Sylvain R. Ralaiarimalala, and Julia PG Jones. "Analysis of patterns of bushmeat consumption reveals extensive exploitation of protected species in eastern Madagascar." PloS one 6, no. 12 (2011).
- Razafimanahaka, Julie H., Richard KB Jenkins, Daudet Andriafidison, Félicien Randrianandrianina, Victor Rakotomboavonjy, Aidan Keane, and Julia PG Jones. "Novel approach for quantifying illegal bushmeat consumption reveals high consumption of protected species in Madagascar." Oryx 46, no. 4 (2012): 584–592.
- Rakotomamonjy, S. N., J. P. G. Jones, J. H. Razafimanahaka, B. Ramamonjisoa, and S. J. Williams. "The effects of environmental education on children's and parents' knowledge and attitudes towards lemurs in rural Madagascar." Animal Conservation 18, no. 2 (2015): 157–166.
- Kofoky, Amyot, Daudet Andriafidison, Fanja Ratrimomanarivo, H. Julie Razafimanahaka, Daniel Rakotondravony, Paul A. Racey, and Richard KB Jenkins. "Habitat use, roost selection and conservation of bats in Tsingy de Bemaraha National Park, Madagascar." In Vertebrate Conservation and Biodiversity, pp. 213–227. Springer, Dordrecht, 2006.
- Rakotoarivelo, Andrinajoro R., Julie H. Razafimanahaka, Sahondra Rabesihanaka, Julia PG Jones, and Richard KB Jenkins. "Lois et règlements sur la faune sauvage à Madagascar: Progrès accomplis et besoins du futur." Madagascar Conservation & Development 6, no. 1 (2011).
- St John, F., Daniel Brockington, Nils Bunnefeld, Rosaleen Duffy, Katherine Homewood, Julia PG Jones, A. Keane, Eleanor J. Milner-Gulland, Ana Nuno, and J. Razafimanahaka. "Research ethics: assuring anonymity at the individual level may not be sufficient to protect research participants from harm." (2016).

== See also ==
- Conservation in Madagascar
