= Aquaculture in Madagascar =

Aquaculture in Madagascar started to take off in the 1980s. The industry includes the cultivation of sea cucumbers, seaweed, fish and shrimp and is being used to stimulate the country's economy, increase the wages of fishermen and women, and improve the regions ocean water quality. Coastal regions of Madagascar are reliant on the Indian Ocean's marine resources as a source of food, income, and cultural identity.

== History ==
Over the past fifty years, aquaculture in Madagascar went through four stages of development. It started during the colonial occupation when new marine species were introduced. After the nation's independence, the government played a major role in regulating the development of aquaculture ponds. During the 1980s, the government stepped back from state-owned controlled aquaculture fields to allow independent entrepreneurs to invest the sector. Then, in the past 15 years, a marketing-focused approach to promote Malagasy aquaculture became dominant to favor exports.

== Aquaculture sectors ==
=== Sea cucumbers ===
Sea cucumbers, considered a delicacy in Asia, play a crucial role in recycling nutrients from sediments on the ocean floor to form the bedrock of complex marine chains. Wild sea cucumber populations have dropped with many fishers now using SCUBA gear to access those that are left, a practice now banned in Madagascar. A 2012 EU commissioned study of Madagascar's sea cucumber trade showed an 85% drop in the population since the fishery's peak.

The country's first locally owned sea-cucumber farm is located in Tampolove and was developed with the British NGO Blue Ventures. They developed a protected area called Velondriake ("to live with the sea" in the Vezo language). In the southeast Velondriake region of the island, Toliara's marine institute uses new technology to produce broodstock of sea cucumbers to sell to fishers. Community farming groups then grow these animals in simple mesh farming pens close to their village. Because sea cucumbers feed off the ocean floor, the growing process requires no food, just pen maintenance. After nine months sea cucumbers reach their full adult size and are sold to exporters for around US$2.50 each. This system links isolated communities to global markets and has been proven to raise income of farmers who make less than one-dollar fifty per day, by US$30 per month, nearly doubling their monthly income.

=== Shrimps ===
Commercial shrimp farming was introduced to Madagascar in the early 1990s. International organizations and foreign investors have dominated this industry with financing, technical support and infrastructure development. Shrimp aquaculture in Madagascar has grown in importance over the years, and is responsible for the direct and indirect employment of over 3 000 people on the island. As of 2005, Madagascar counted six shrimp aquaculture companies. During the 1980s, the FAO concluded that shrimp aquaculture was a great factor of development, and oriented many development programs in Madagascar towards this industry. Besakoa became a boom town thanks to those developments, going from 10 households in the 1990s to 3,000 inhabitants 10 years later after the site Aqualma opened.

Shrimp farmed in Madagascar are high quality and sell at relatively high prices. Today, the shrimp export industry has difficulty competing with less costly shrimp from other areas such as Asia.

One species of shrimp, from Madagascar, prized by shrimp farmers is Penaeus monodon. It is renowned for its size and quality and sells for up to three times as much as shrimp from other countries. Penaeus Monodon is valued by consumers for both its taste and texture but it is too expensive to those whose purchase based on the price. Therefore, on price alone, shrimp products from Madagascar cannot compete in export markets. It is unknown whether they can compete in high-end niche markets, but it could be a marketing opportunity and solution to the crisis the industry now faces. The company Unima was the first to breed pathogen-free Penaeus Monodon on the island and manages the first farm in Africa to be awarded the Aquaculture Stewardship Certification by the Aquaculture Stewardship Council (ASC).

Marine aquaculture in the northwest is dominated by giant tiger prawn farming near the mangrove areas which have been identified by the Madagascar Shrimp Aquaculture Development Master Plan (Schéma d'aménagement pour l'aquaculture de crevettes à Madagascar - SAACM). These farm areas are systems composed of breeding ponds, a hatchery, a processing and packaging factory and storage facilities.

=== Seaweed ===
Seaweed farming is practiced in the northeastern region of the island in conjunction with the IBIS Madagascar company. Harvesting is done in a coastal zone, usually by women and children. Along with Tanzania, Madagascar is the top producer of aquaculture seaweed in Africa.

Seaweed, just like sea cucumbers, is also cultivated and harvested, among other places, in the Velondriake protected area.

== Training and research ==
Training and research on aquaculture started in the 80s with the Marine Station of Toliara and enhanced by the implementation of the Fishery High Training Unit (UFSH: Unité de Formation Supérieure Halieutique). The Marine Station, established in 1961 near of the current Harbor of Toliara, has achieved many research mainly on coral reefs in the South West (Bay of Toliara and Bay of Ranobe), especially the Great Reef Toliara (GRT). Since 1972, with the gradual creation of the current University of Toliara, research has diversified and included fisheries. Several researchers and technicians have been trained, but at the time the need was more academic and pedagogical. With the UFSH project funded by FAO, it was extended to aquaculture. 40 fisheries scientists Engineers were trained with several specialties including fishery and aquaculture. Most of these engineers have strengthened the team of the Ministry for Fisheries and Agriculture, other contributed to the creation and development of the first shrimp farms in Madagascar (currently grouped in UNIMA). Two engineers were recruited by the Fishery and Marine Science Institute (IH.SM: Institut Halieutique et des Sciences Marines) to ensure following training of new technicians, managers and aquaculture, and new fisheries scientists Engineers (effective training of 20 new engineers in 2013). Both research and training entities have combined their structure to create in 1993, the current IH.SM. Since 1993, all training and research in fisheries and aquaculture are being provided by this Institute. With the adoption of the LMD system by the Universities of Madagascar, training is now grouped into 3 academic cycles: (1) License of the Sea and Littoral which include Biodiversity-Environment and Fisheries and Aquaculture options; (2) Masters in Applied Oceanography including several specializations and (3) PhD in Applied Oceanography. Research in these field are now welle diversified and performed by more than 30 researchers (PhD) and several PhD research Student. In recent years, skill levels in the Madagascar aquaculture industry have improved considerably. This has been largely due to the improvement efforts of IH.SM and the government created, in yearly 2000s the Ministry of Fishery and Marines resources. The implementation of non-profit NGO's, such as MIDEM, which have become an integral part of the islands seafood industry has also enhanced the effectiveness of the development of fishery and aquaculture training in Madagascar. These NGOs especially focus their work on Aquaculture training programs based on prior experience and training for wild fisheries and marine farms. The Independent Mission for Development and Education in Madagascar (MIDEM) is an open, non-profit NGO in Madagascar aiming to provide a sustainable solution to the needs of the Malagasy population stricken by extreme poverty and social injustice on the East coast of Madagascar. MIDEM's mission is to improve livelihoods by implementing projects on education, rural development including fish farming, entrepreneurship and social development.

== Legislation and administration ==
Marine farmers usually look for sheltered and unpolluted waters rich in nutrients. Often these areas are also desirable for other purposes. In the late 1990s, demand for coastal aquaculture space increased. Aquaculture developed with the regional councils unsure of how marine farms might impact the delicate coastal environments. By early 2000, farmers/fishers and NGO's were operating with inadequate regulations for managing the coast in a sustainable way. This lack of regulation lead to the creation of locally managed marine areas (LMMA). There are however, few regulations limiting aquaculture in Madagascar, and of the few, even less are enforced.
