= Food security in Madagascar =

The island country of Madagascar remains plagued by political and economic instability, poverty, and food insecurity. While the country engaged in an ambitious transformation program designed to improve social, economic, and governance indicators between 2002 and 2008, a 2009 political crisis has thrown these improvements off-course. This political strife, in combination with the 2008 financial crisis, led to a 4% decline in economic growth in 2009 (World Bank 2012).

== Overview ==
According to the 2009 Human Development Report of the United Nations Development Programme, about two thirds of the population live below the poverty threshold, 30 percent are illiterate, only 47 percent have access to safe water, with a life expectancy at birth of 61 years. Madagascar ranked 135th out of 169 countries in the Human Development Index.

Food supplies lack diversity and do not meet the needs of the population. A third of the population is undernourished. Together with a reduction in food supplies, lack of access to food, and natural disasters, poverty is a major cause of food insecurity of households. Poverty is pervasive in rural areas. About 85 percent of the poor live in rural areas and 60 percent of them are considered as extremely poor. With the growth in the population, the situation has worsened, so that half of Malagasy children show signs of chronic malnutrition. Toliara Province in the South-West has the highest rate of poverty, however, the majority of the rural poor are concentrated in the three most densely populated provinces of Antananarivo, Fianarantsoa and Toamasina.

The poor are particularly vulnerable to weather-induced risks simply by virtue of their poverty. Poor households have few assets to sell and their consumption is already low, so in times of scarcity they do not have much to buffer them from food insecurity. The most vulnerable groups in rural areas are women (who account for 55 percent of the population and 80 percent of the economically active population) and children under five years of age. Survival strategies to secure sufficient food supply and minimize risk include diversification of agricultural activities, development of off-farm activities, seasonal or permanent migration and wage labour. Nevertheless, vulnerability of Madagascar's population has been worsened over years of natural disasters, political instability, and limited investment in social infrastructure, with coping mechanisms largely exhausted. Environmental degradation and soil erosion has further harmed rural populations' ability to cope.

On account of its geographic position, Madagascar succumbs every year to the effects of natural disasters, which routinely strike different regions of the country and affect the food situation of different sections of the population. In 39 years (from 1968 to 2007), tropical storms, cyclones and consequent floods have caused damage estimated at nearly US$1.6 billion and affected 8 million people. Acute droughts have affected nearly 2.7 million people, in addition to the effects of recurrent drought in the South. In addition, Madagascar is regularly affected by the locusts.

The National Disaster Risk Management (DRM) System consists of a decentralized structure of DRM committees (notably at region, district and commune levels) under the umbrella of the Conseil National de Gestion des Risques et des Catastrophes, under the Prime Minister's Office. Donors substantially support the Government in the set-up and implementation of this system.

In 2020, UNICEF estimated that over 100,000 children under the age of 5 suffered from malnutrition, and over 1 million people required food assistance, due to climate change like droughts and floods, particularly in the south.

In 2026 according to the World Food Program 558,000 children are either suffering, or at risk of suffering acute malnutrition

== See also ==
- Agriculture of Madagascar
- Climate change in Madagascar
- Food Security in Burkina Faso

== Bibliography ==
- Food and Agricultural Organization (FAO). Nutrition Country Profile for Madagascar. Text online: http://www.fao.org/ag/AGN/nutrition/mdg_en.stm
- International Fund for Agricultural Development (IFAD). Rural Poverty portal. http://www.ruralpovertyportal.org/web/guest/country/home/tags/madagascar
- World Food Program (WFP). Country Programme Madagascar 2005-2009. Text online: http://www.wfp.org/content/country-programme-madagascar-2005-2009
- United Nations Development Programme. Country profile. Text online: https://web.archive.org/web/20110817144953/http://hdrstats.undp.org/en/countries/profiles/MDG.html
- United Nations Development Programme. Plan d'Action du Programme Pays/CPAP 2008-2011. Text online: http://www.snu.mg/new/sites/pnud/article.php?article_id=749&lang=fr
- Deutsche Gesellschaft für Internationale Zusammenarbeit web site. http://www.gtz.de/en/weltweit/afrika/587.htm
- IFPRI Food Security Portal http://www.foodsecurityportal.org/madagascar/resources
