= Wildlife of Madagascar =

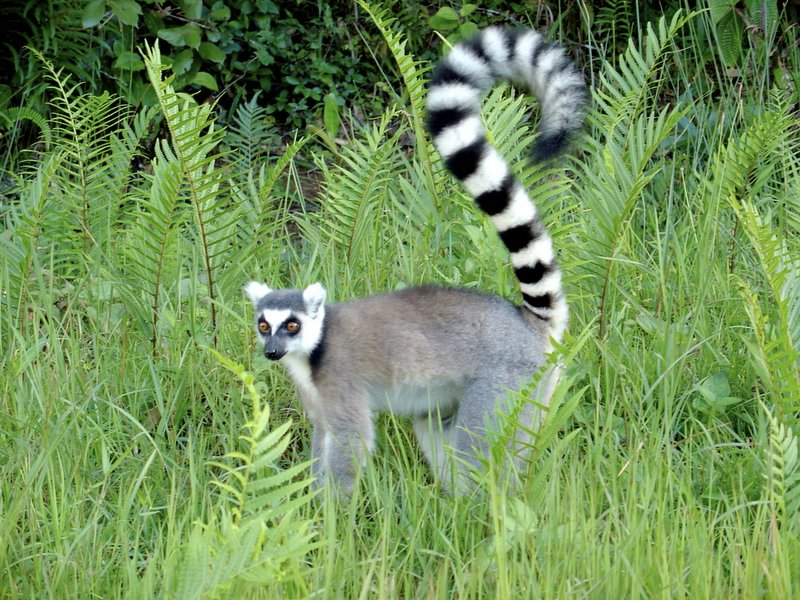
A ring-tailed lemur (Lemur catta), the most familiar of Madagascar's numerous species of lemur.

The composition of Madagascar's wildlife reflects the fact that the island has been isolated for about 88 million years. The prehistoric breakup of the supercontinent Gondwana separated the Madagascar-Antarctica-India landmass from the Africa-South America landmass around 135 million years ago. Madagascar later split from India about 88 million years ago, allowing plants and animals on the island to evolve in relative isolation.

As a result of the island's long isolation from neighboring continents, Madagascar is home to an abundance of plants and animals found nowhere else on Earth. Approximately 90% of all plant and animal species found in Madagascar are endemic, including the lemurs (a type of strepsirrhine primate), the carnivorous fossa and many birds. This distinctive ecology has led some ecologists to refer to Madagascar as the "eighth continent", and the island has been classified by Conservation International as a biodiversity hotspot. As recent as 2021, the "smallest reptile on earth" was also found in Madagascar, Brookesia nana, also known as the nano-chameleon.

== Fauna ==
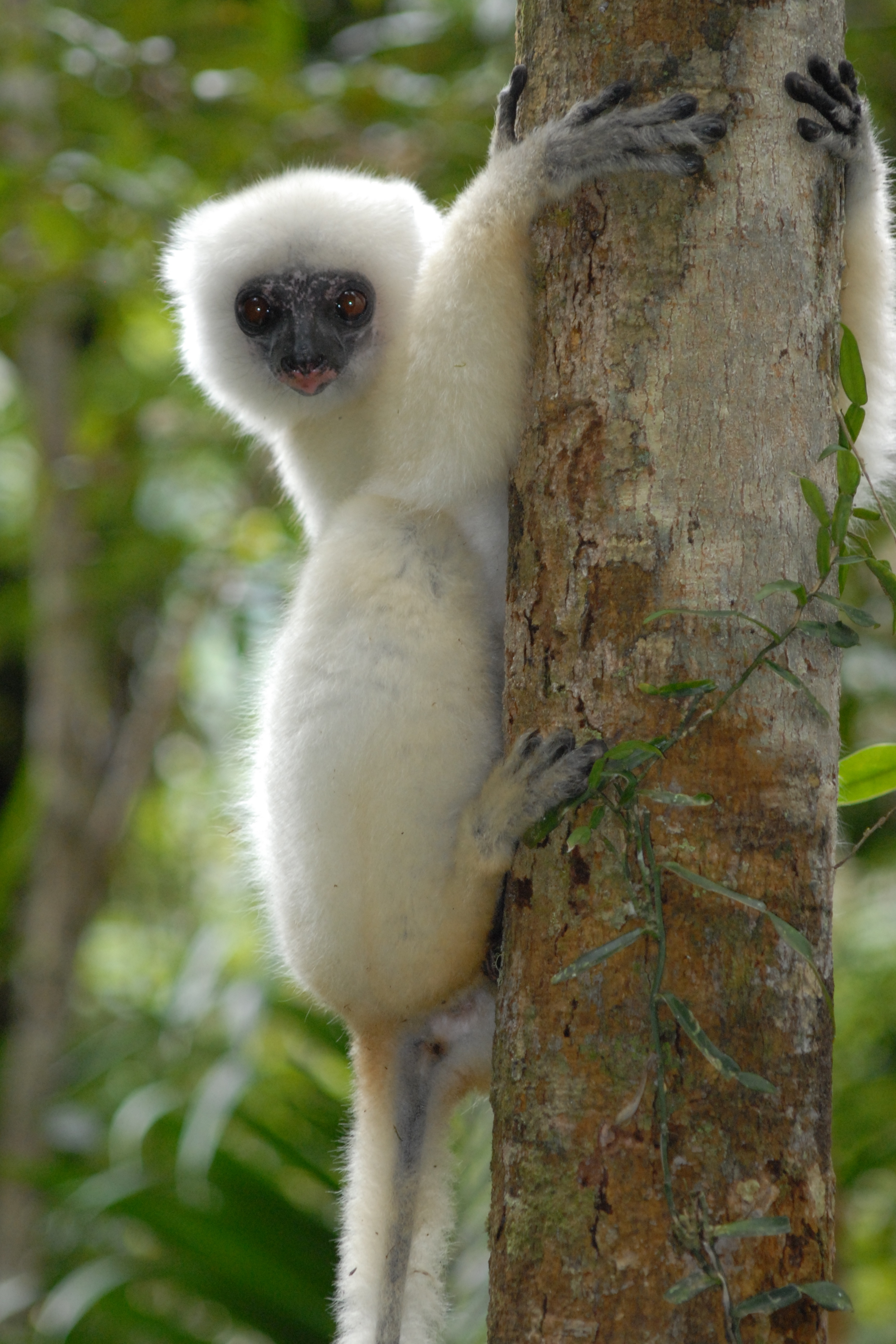
The silky sifaka is one of over 100 known species and subspecies of lemur found only in Madagascar.

Madagascar's isolation from other land masses throughout the Cenozoic Era has led to the evolution of a large proportion of endemic animal species and the absence of many taxa found on neighboring continents. Some of Madagascar's animals appear to represent lineages that have been present since the breakup of Gondwana, while many others, including all of the nonflying native mammals, are descendants of ancestors that survived rare rafting or swimming voyages from Africa (likely aided by currents). As of 2012 it has over 200 extant mammal species, including over 100 species of lemurs, about 300 species of birds, more than 260 species of reptiles, and at least 266 species of amphibians. The island also has a rich invertebrate fauna including earthworms, insects, spiders and nonmarine molluscs.

Lemurs have been characterized as "Madagascar's flagship mammal species" by Conservation International. In the absence of monkeys and other competitors, these primates have adapted to a wide range of habitats and diversified into numerous species. As of 2012, there were officially 103 species and subspecies of lemur, 39 of which were discovered by zoologists between 2000 and 2008. They are almost all classified as rare, vulnerable, or endangered. Since the arrival of humans on Madagascar, at least 17 species of lemur have become extinct; all of them were larger than the surviving lemur species.

A number of other mammals, including the cat-like fossa, are endemic to Madagascar. Over 300 have been recorded on the island, of which over 60 percent (including four families and 42 genera) are endemic. The few families and genera of reptile that have reached Madagascar have diversified into more than 260 species, with over 90 percent of these being endemic (including one endemic family). The island is home to two-thirds of the world's chameleon species, including the smallest known, and researchers have proposed that Madagascar may be the origin of all chameleons.

Endemic fish of Madagascar include two families, 15 genera and over 100 species, primarily inhabiting the island's freshwater lakes and rivers. Although invertebrates remain poorly studied on Madagascar, researchers have found high rates of endemism among the known species. All 651 species of terrestrial snail are endemic, as are a majority of the island's butterflies, scarab beetles, lacewings, spiders and dragonflies.

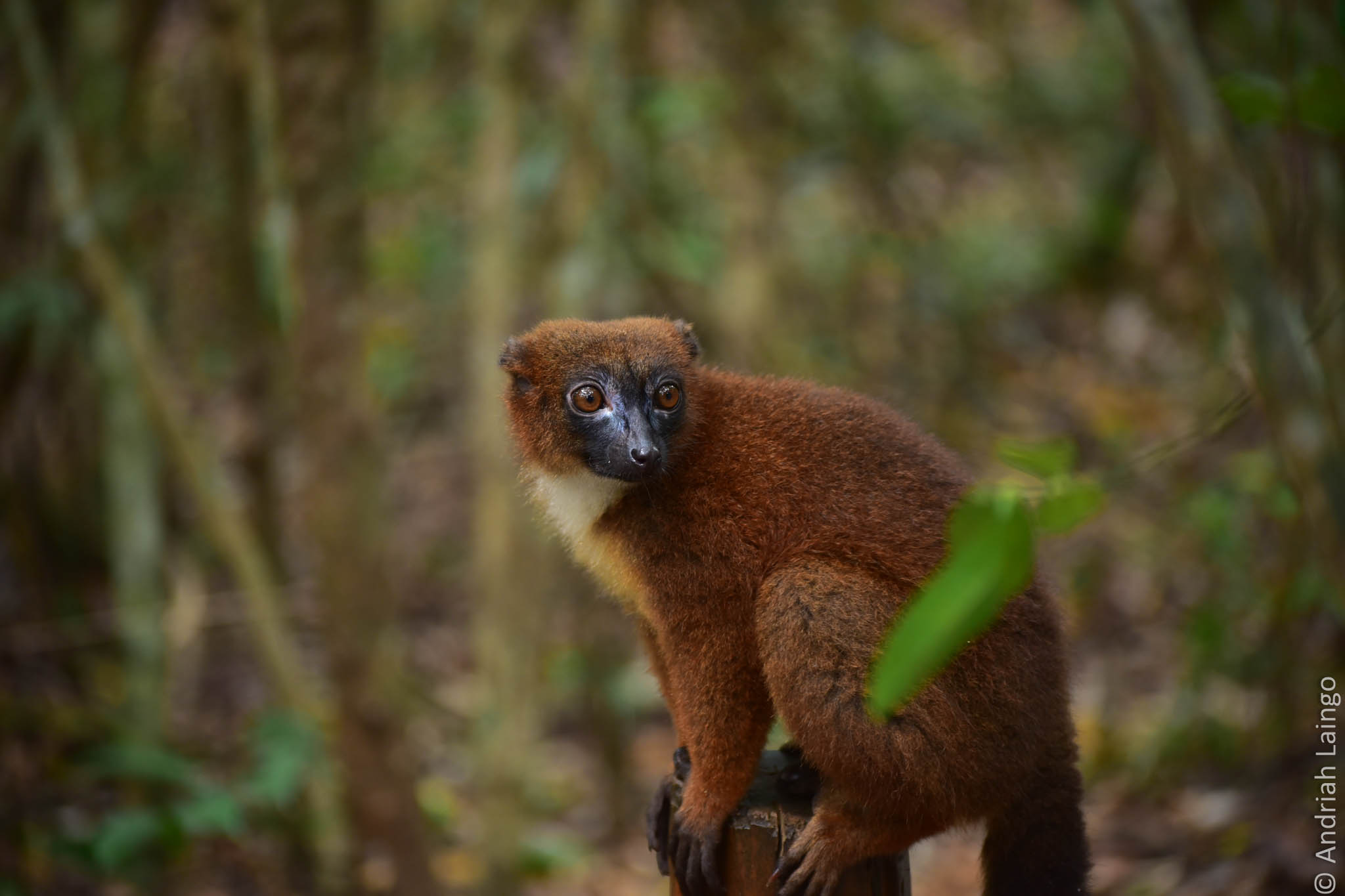

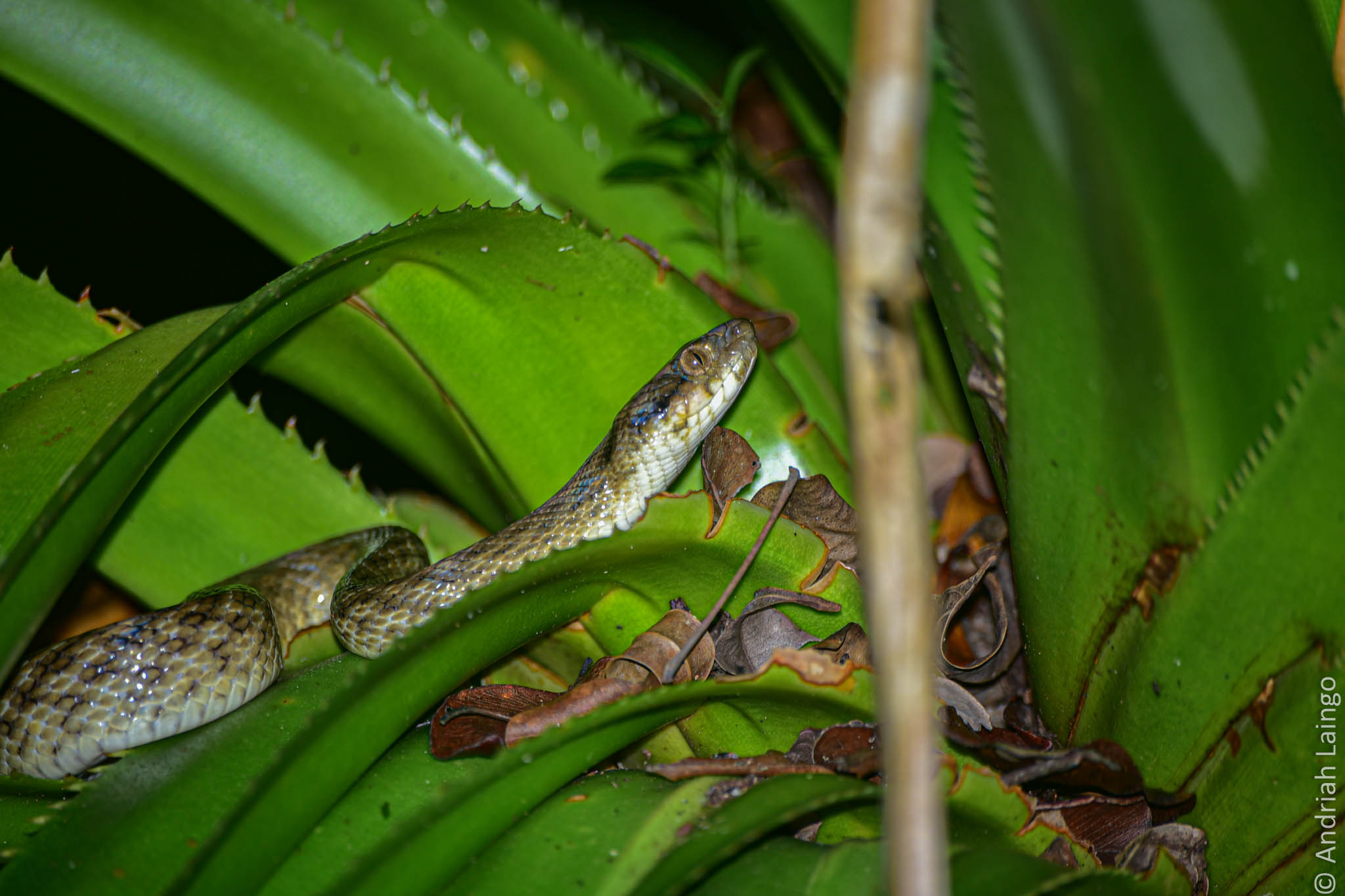

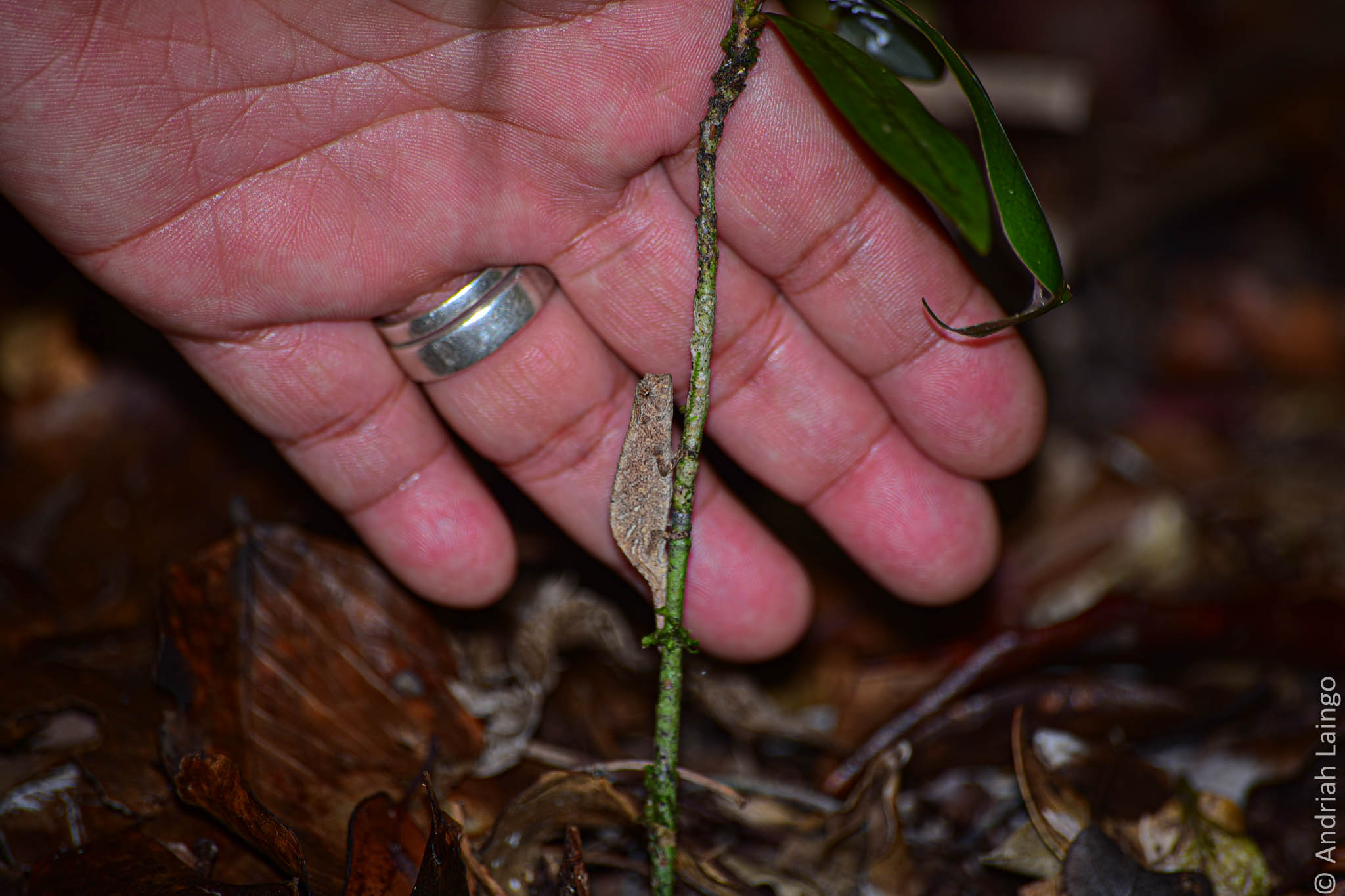

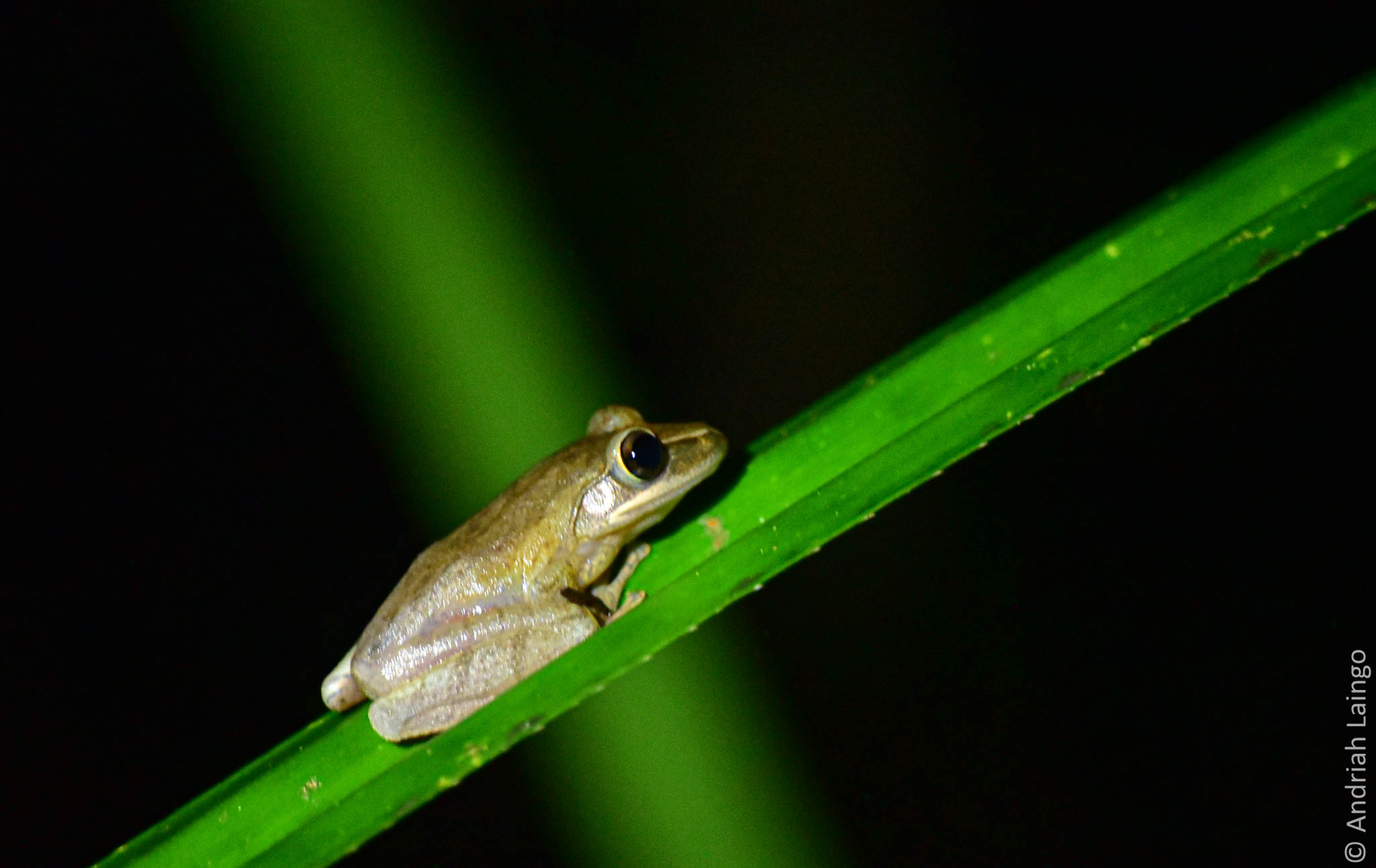

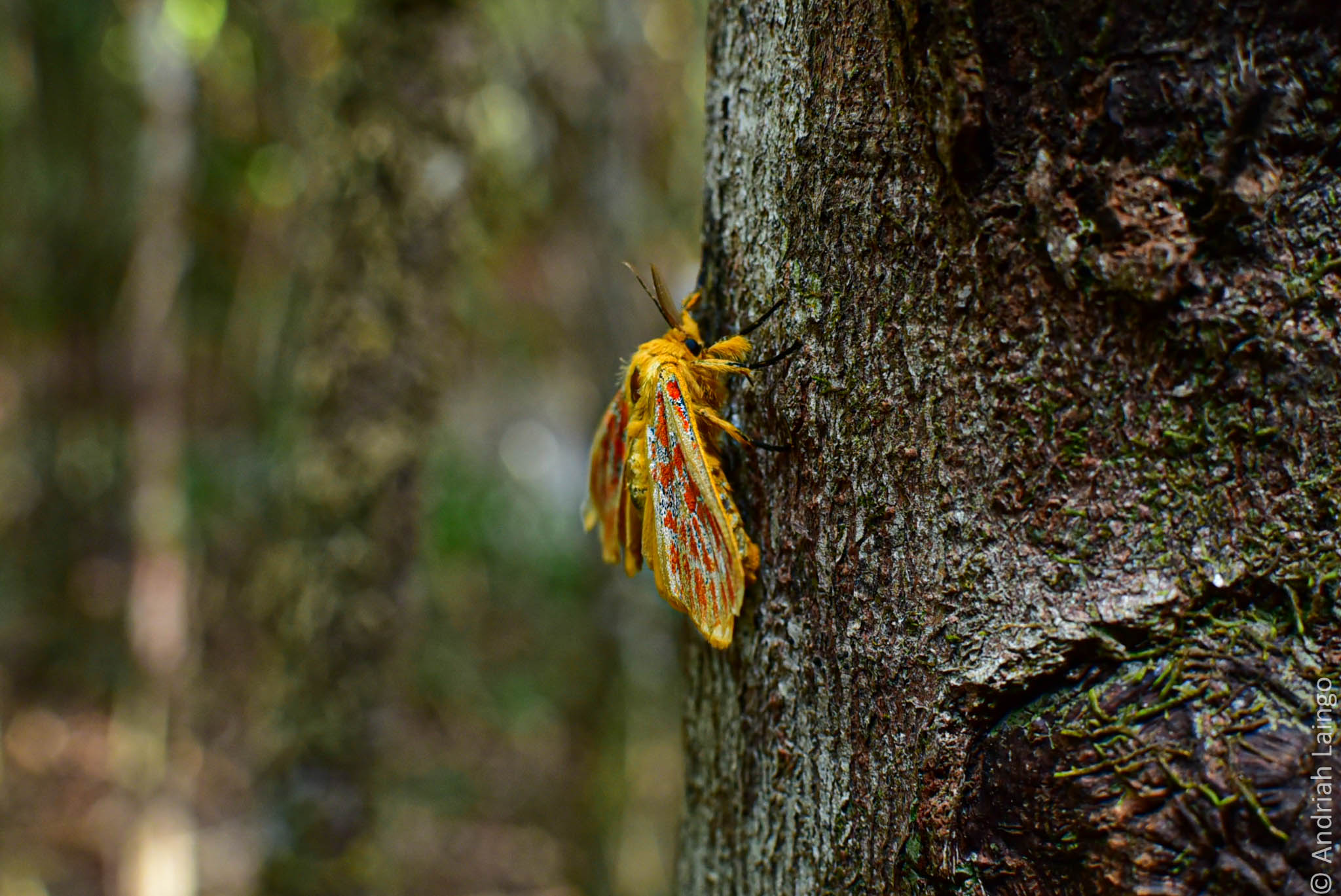

== Flora ==
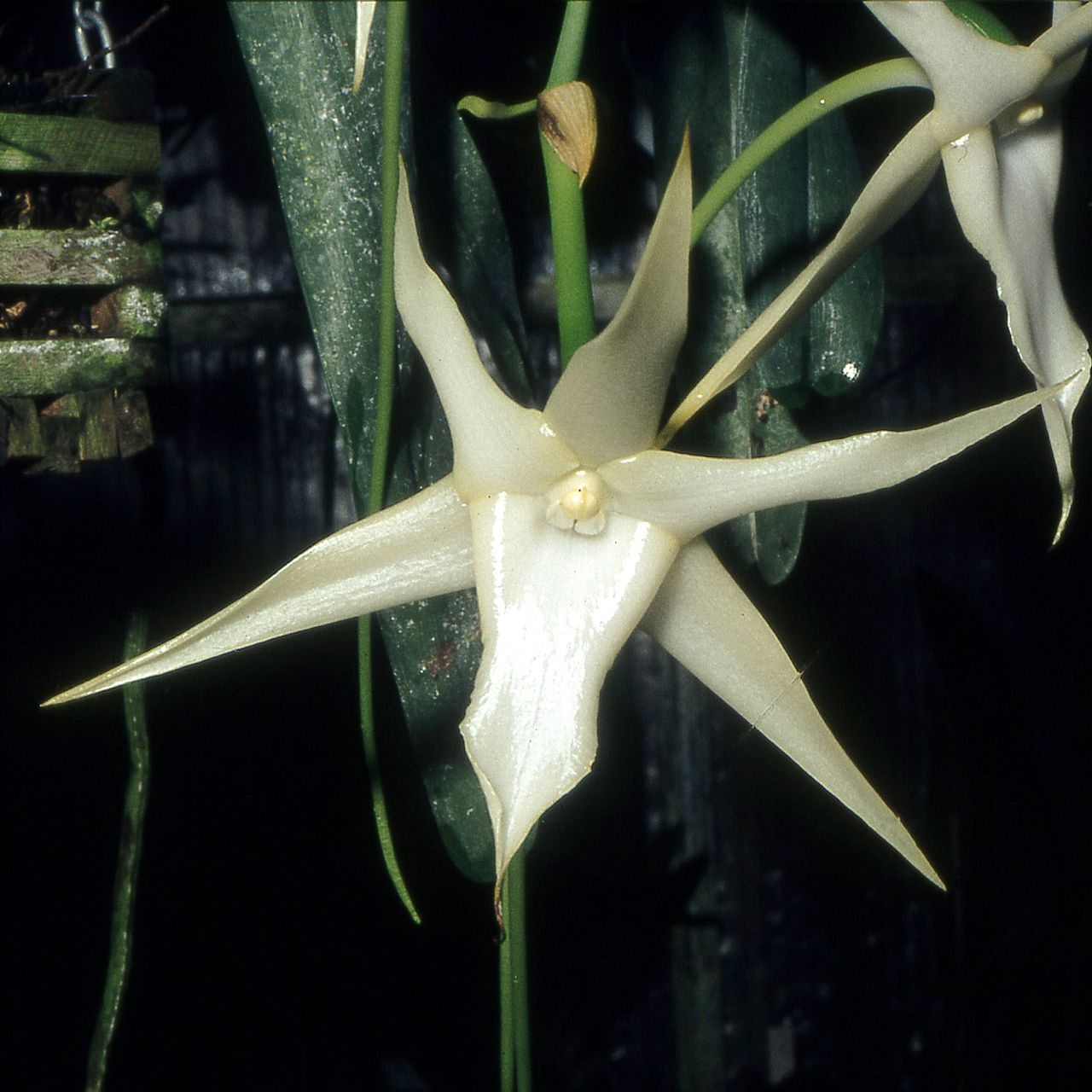
Comet orchid (Angraecum sesquipedale), the flowers of this orchid have a very long spur and are pollinated by a species of hawkmoth with a proboscis of matching length.

More than 80 percent of Madagascar's 14,883 plant species are found nowhere else in the world, including five plant families. There are several endemic families including the Asteropeiaceae, Sarcolaenaceae and Sphaerosepalaceae. The humid eastern part of the island was formerly covered in rainforest with many palms, ferns and bamboo, although much of this forest has been reduced by human activity. The west has areas of dry deciduous forest with many lianas and with tamarind and baobabs among the dominant trees. Subhumid forest once covered much of the central plateau but grassland is now the dominant vegetation type there. The family Didiereaceae, composed of four genera and 11 species, is limited to the spiny forests of southwestern Madagascar.

Four-fifths of the world's Pachypodium species are endemic to the island. Three-fourths of Madagascar's 860 orchid species are found here alone, as are six of the world's eight baobab species. The island is home to around 170 palm species, three times as many as on all of mainland Africa; 165 of them are endemic.

Many native plant species are used as herbal remedies for a variety of afflictions. The drugs vinblastine and vincristine, used to treat Hodgkin's disease, leukemia and other cancers, were derived from the Madagascar periwinkle. The traveler's palm, known locally as ravinala and endemic to the eastern rain forests, is highly iconic of Madagascar and is featured in the national emblem as well as the Air Madagascar logo.

== Environmental issues ==
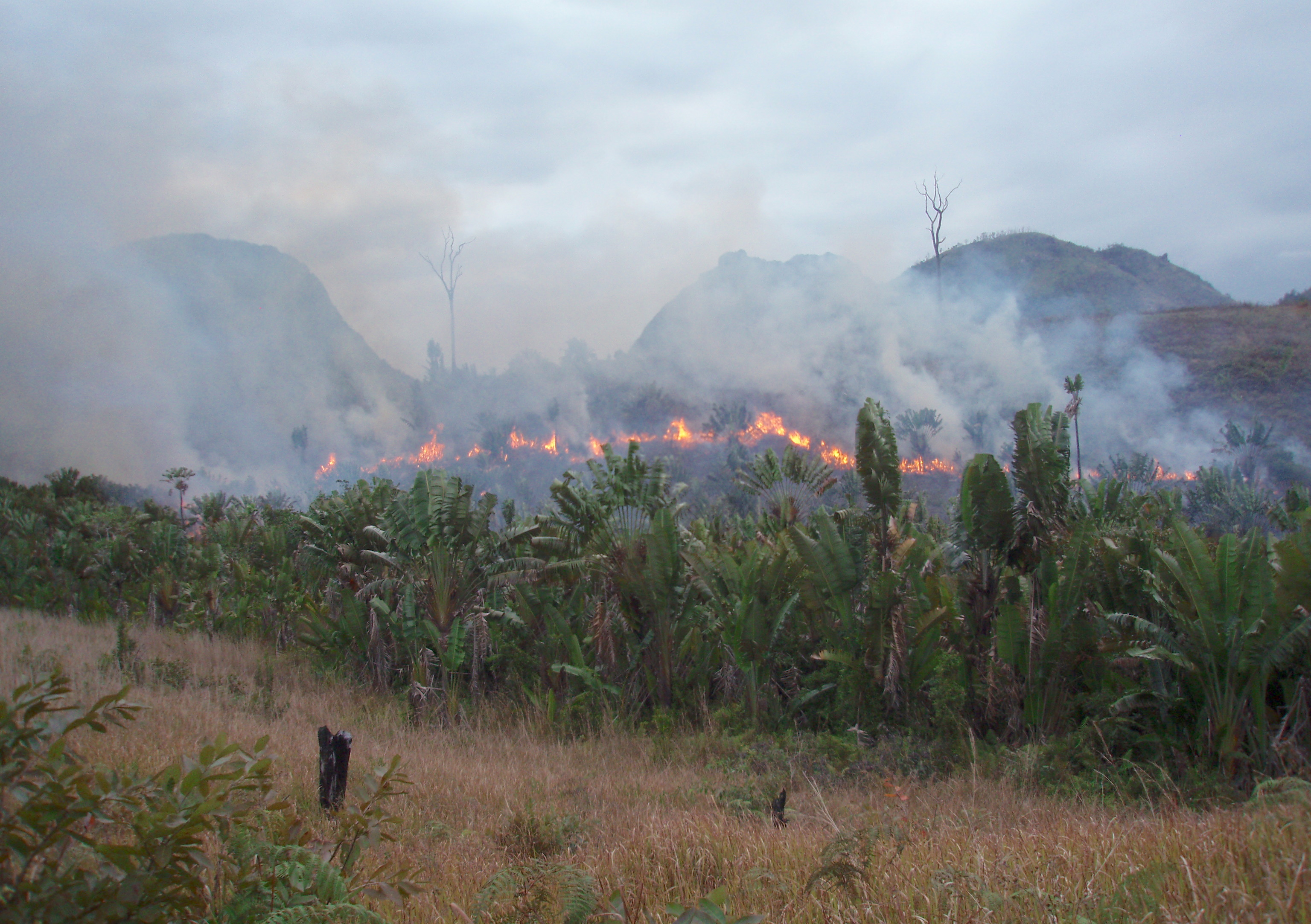
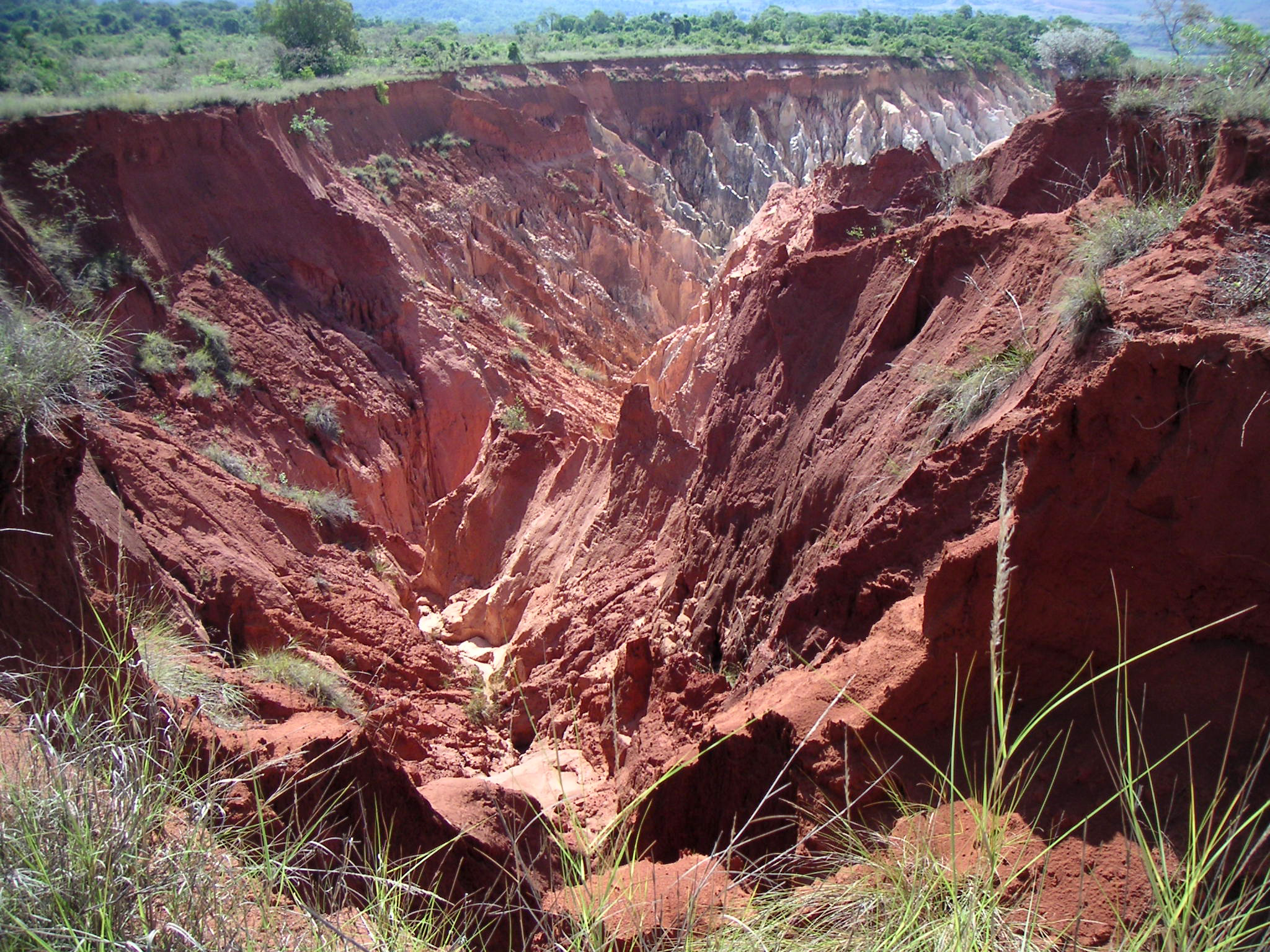
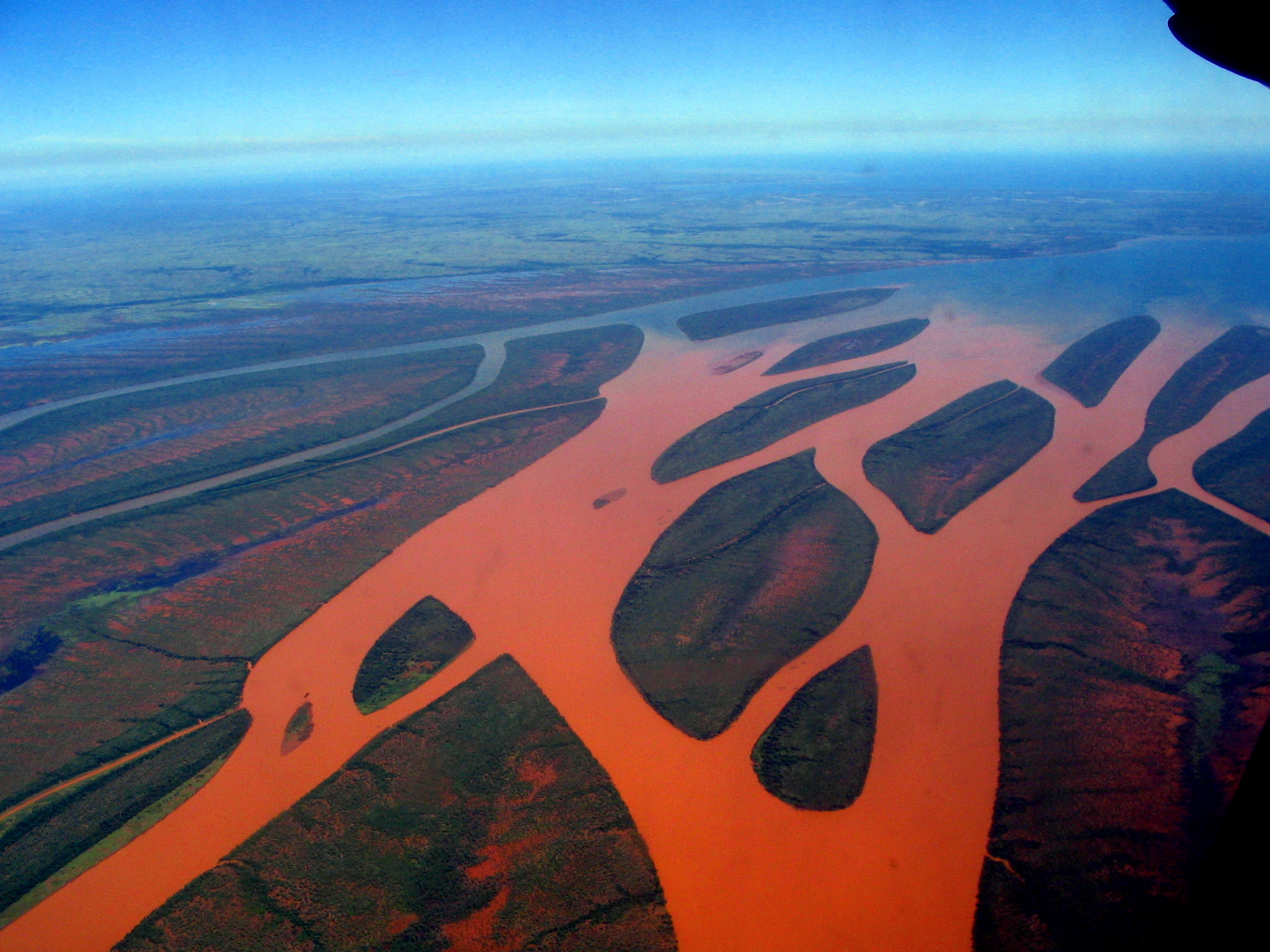
Tavy (slash-and-burn) destruction of native forest habitat is widespread (left), causing massive erosion (center) and silting of rivers (right).

Madagascar's varied fauna and flora are endangered by human activity. Since the arrival of humans around 2,350 years ago, Madagascar has lost more than 90 percent of its original forest.

This forest loss is largely fueled by tavy ("fat"), a traditional slash-and-burn agricultural practice imported to Madagascar by the earliest settlers. Malagasy farmers embrace and perpetuate the practice not only for its practical benefits as an agricultural technique, but for its cultural associations with prosperity, health and venerated ancestral custom (fomba malagasy).

As human population density rose on the island, deforestation accelerated beginning around 1400 years ago. By the 16th century, the central highlands had been largely cleared of their original forests. More recent contributors to the loss of forest cover include the growth in cattle herd size since their introduction around 1000 years ago, a continued reliance on charcoal as a fuel for cooking, and the increased prominence of coffee as a cash crop over the past century. According to a conservative estimate, about 40 percent of the island's original forest cover was lost from the 1950s to 2000, with a thinning of remaining forest areas by 80 percent.

In addition to traditional agricultural practice, wildlife conservation is challenged by the illicit harvesting of protected forests, as well as the state-sanctioned harvesting of precious woods within national parks. Although banned by then-President Marc Ravalomanana from 2000 to 2009, the collection of small quantities of precious timber from national parks was re-authorized in January 2009 and has dramatically intensified under the administration of current head of state Andry Rajoelina as a key source of state revenues to offset cuts in donor support following Ravalomanana's ouster. It is anticipated that all the island's rainforests, excluding those in protected areas and the steepest eastern mountain slopes, will have been deforested by 2025.

Habitat destruction and hunting have threatened many of Madagascar's endemic species or driven them to extinction. The island's elephant birds, a family of endemic giant ratites, became extinct in 17th century or earlier, most probably due to human hunting of adult birds and poaching of their large eggs for food. Numerous giant lemur species vanished with the arrival of human settlers to the island, while others became extinct over the course of the centuries as a growing human population put greater pressures on lemur habitats and, among some populations, increased the rate of lemur hunting for food.

A July 2012 assessment found that the exploitation of natural resources since the 2009 coup has had dire consequences for the island's wildlife: 90 percent of lemur species were found to be threatened with extinction, the highest proportion of any mammalian group. Of these, 23 species were classified as critically endangered. By contrast, a previous study in 2008 had found only 38 percent of lemur species were at risk of extinction.

Domestic and feral cats, as well as dogs, have a negative impact on native wildlife.

=== Conservation ===
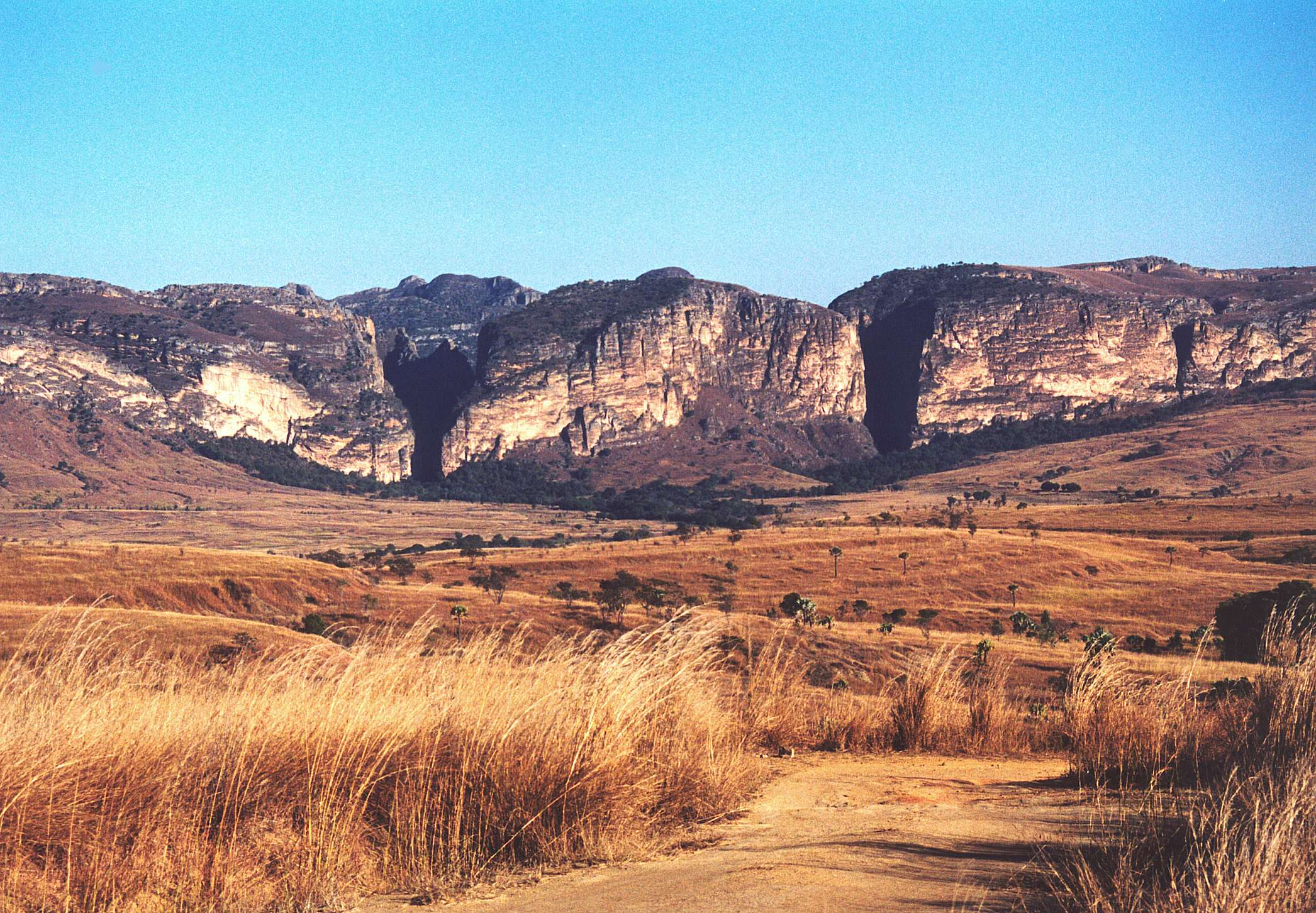
Isalo National Park.

In 1983, Irish author Dervla Murphy described her impression of the status of conservation in Madagascar while visiting the Bureau d'Eaux et Forêts (Department of Waterways and Forests) in Antananarivo for the purposes of obtaining lemur-reserve permits:

Conservation is low on the list of official Malagasy concerns. Repeatedly we got the impression that it is seen as another form of Western exploitation, a left-over from colonialism which brings well-paid vazaha (foreigner) experts into the country to lecture the natives on how they should use their meagre resources. If drought or floods have reduced an area's food supplies, why not catch as many lemur as possible for the pot? [..] It is easy to be a committed conservationist on a full belly.

In 2003, Ravalomanana announced the Durban Vision, an initiative to more than triple the island's protected natural areas to over 60,000 km^{2} (23,000 sq mi) or 10 percent of Madagascar's land surface. As of 2011, areas protected by the state included five Strict Nature Reserves (Réserves Naturelles Intégrales), 21 Wildlife Reserves (Réserves Spéciales) and 21 National Parks (Parcs Nationaux). In 2007, six of the national parks were declared a joint World Heritage Site under the name Rainforests of the Atsinanana. These parks are Marojejy, Masoala, Ranomafana, Zahamena, Andohahela and Andringitra.

Local timber merchants are harvesting scarce species of rosewood trees from protected rainforests within Marojejy National Park and exporting the wood to China for the production of luxury furniture and musical instruments. To raise public awareness of Madagascar's environmental challenges, the Wildlife Conservation Society opened an exhibit entitled "Madagascar!" in June 2008 at the Bronx Zoo in New York.

There are many conservation networks dedicated to conserving wildlife in Madagascar. The Lemur Conservation Network works with over 100 organizations to mobilize funds and disperse them in order to promote conservation and research on lemurs. They also have a funding guide available to guide conservation donations, and promote a blog to engage the public and spread awareness. They are headed by Lucía Rodríguez Valverde and Seheno Corduant-Andriantsaralaza.

Across the island, Madagaskara Voakajy aims to conserve many endangered species that aitants of Madagascar. This organization, directed by Julie Hanta Razafimanahaka, focuses on community education in order to allow local people to understand the threats of bushmeat consumption, not only from a conservation standpoint but from a human health perspective as well. They also train young Malagasy people to become future biologists and conversationalists.

=== Research ===
Current research in and on Madagascar and the Western Indian Ocean islands is published in the Madagascan open access journal Madagascar Conservation & Development, an initiative by the Missouri Botanical Garden, Global Vision International, the Madagascar Research and Conservation Program and the Institute and Museum of Anthropology at the University of Zurich. The Lemur Conservation Network also provides funding for many lemur research programs. Madagasikara Voakajy participates in research and publication in order to bring conservation into the research world.

== Bibliography ==
- Bradt, Hilary (2011). Madagascar, 10th Ed.: The Bradt Travel Guide. London: Bradt Travel Guides. ISBN 978-1-84162-341-2.
- Davies, S.J.J.F. (2003). "Birds I: Tinamous and Ratites to Hoatzins". In Hutchins, Michael (ed.). Grzimek's Animal Life Encyclopedia. Vol. 8 (2 ed.). Farmington Hills, MI: Gale Group. ISBN 0-7876-5784-0.
- Ellis, William (1859). Three visits to Madagascar during ... 1853-1854-1856. London: Oxford University.
- Emoff, Ron (2004). "Spitting into the wind: Multi-edged environmentalism in Malagasy song". In Dawe, Kevin (ed.). Island Musics. New York: Berg. ISBN 978-1-85973-703-3.
- Hillstrom, Kevin; Collier Hillstrom, Laurie (2003). Africa and the Middle East: a continental overview of environmental issues. Santa Barbara, CA: ABC-CLIO. ISBN 978-1-57607-688-0.
- Hobbes, Joseph; Dolan, Andrew (2008). World Regional Geography. Belmont, CA: Cengage Learning. ISBN 978-0-495-38950-7.
- Kull, Christian (2004). Isle of Fire: The Political Ecology of Landscape Burning in Madagascar, Issue 246. Chicago: University of Chicago Press. doi:10.1086/431115. ISBN 978-0-226-46141-0.
