= Ratsiraka =

Ratsiraka is a Malagasy surname. People with the name include:

- Céline Ratsiraka (1938–2025), Malagasy politician, wife of Didier
- Didier Ratsiraka (1936–2021), President of Madagascar 1975–1993 and 1997–2002
- Roland Ratsiraka (born 1966), Malagasy politician, nephew of Didier
