= Aquaculture Stewardship Council =

Organisation promoting and certifying sustainable aquaculture

The Aquaculture Stewardship Council (ASC) is an independent non-profit organisation and labelling organization that establishes protocol on farmed seafood while ensuring sustainable aquaculture. The ASC provides producers with a certification of environmental sustainability and social responsibility.

The Aquaculture Stewardship Council was founded in 2010 by the World Wide Fund for Nature (WWF) and the Dutch Sustainable Trade Initiative (IDH) to manage and implement socially responsible aquaculture.

== Personnel ==
The current ASC CEO is Chris Ninnes. In February 2016, Aldin Hilbrands, Meghan Jeans, Scott Nichols, and Ling Cao joined the ASC Supervisory Board.

== Accreditation process ==
The ASC has standards for the 12 following species: abalone, bivalves (clams, mussels, oysters and scallops), freshwater trout, pangasius, salmon, seriola and cobia, shrimp, and tilapia.

Several pre-competitive organizations are now using the rigorous ASC standards as a means to progress their industry towards more environmental sustainability and social responsibility: such as the Global Salmon Initiative (GSI, established in 2013); and the Sustainable Shrimp Partnership (SSP, launched in March 2018) which operates in Ecuador. The GSI member companies (representing over 50% of the world's global farmed salmon production) have pledged to have all their salmon farms ASC-certified by 2020.

== Certification ==
In 2010, the ASC appointed the Accreditation Services International (ASI) to accredit and oversee certifiers of aquaculture businesses.

The ASC certifies different species groups which includes Tilapia, Salmon, Pangasius, Bivalves, Cobia and Shrimp. In November 2017, a Seaweed Standard was also launched by the ASC together with the Marine Stewardship Council (MSC). Certified ASC products are now available around the world in Austria, Belgium, Canada, Czech Republic, Denmark, Finland, France, Germany, Italy, Hungary, Luxembourg, Netherlands, Norway, Slovenia, Spain, Sweden, Switzerland and the United Kingdom.

== See also ==
- Forest Stewardship Council
- Marine Stewardship Council
- Stewardship
- Aquaculture
