= Outline of Madagascar =

Island nation in the Indian Ocean

The Flag of Madagascar

The Coat of arms of Madagascar

The location of Madagascar

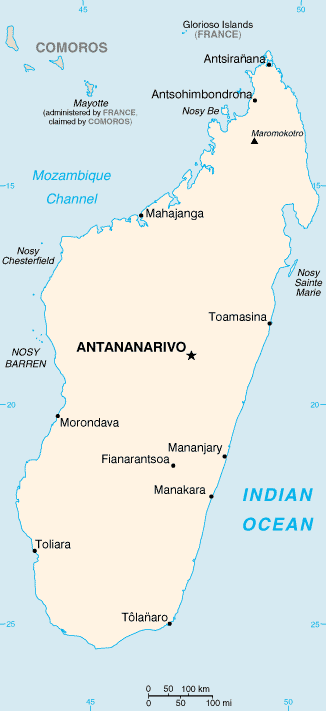
An enlargeable map of Madagascar

The following outline is provided as an overview of and topical guide to Madagascar:

Madagascar – sovereign island nation located in the Indian Ocean off the southeastern coast of Africa. The Island of Madagascar is the fourth-largest island in the world, and is home to 5% of the world's plant and animal species, of which more than 80% are endemic to Madagascar. They include the lemur superfamily of primates, the carnivorous fossa, three bird families and six baobab species.

== General reference ==
- Pronunciation: /mædəˈɡæskɑːr/
- Common English country name: Madagascar
- Official English country name: The Republic of Madagascar
- Common endonym(s): Madagascar (French); Madagasikara (Malagasy)
- Official endonym(s): List of official endonyms of present-day nations and states la République de Madagascar (French); Repoblikan'i Madagasikara (Malagasy)
- Adjectival(s): Malagasy
- Demonym(s): Malagasy, Madagascans
- International rankings of Madagascar
- ISO country codes: MG, MDG, 450
- ISO region codes: See ISO 3166-2:MG
- Internet country code top-level domain: .mg

== Geography of Madagascar ==
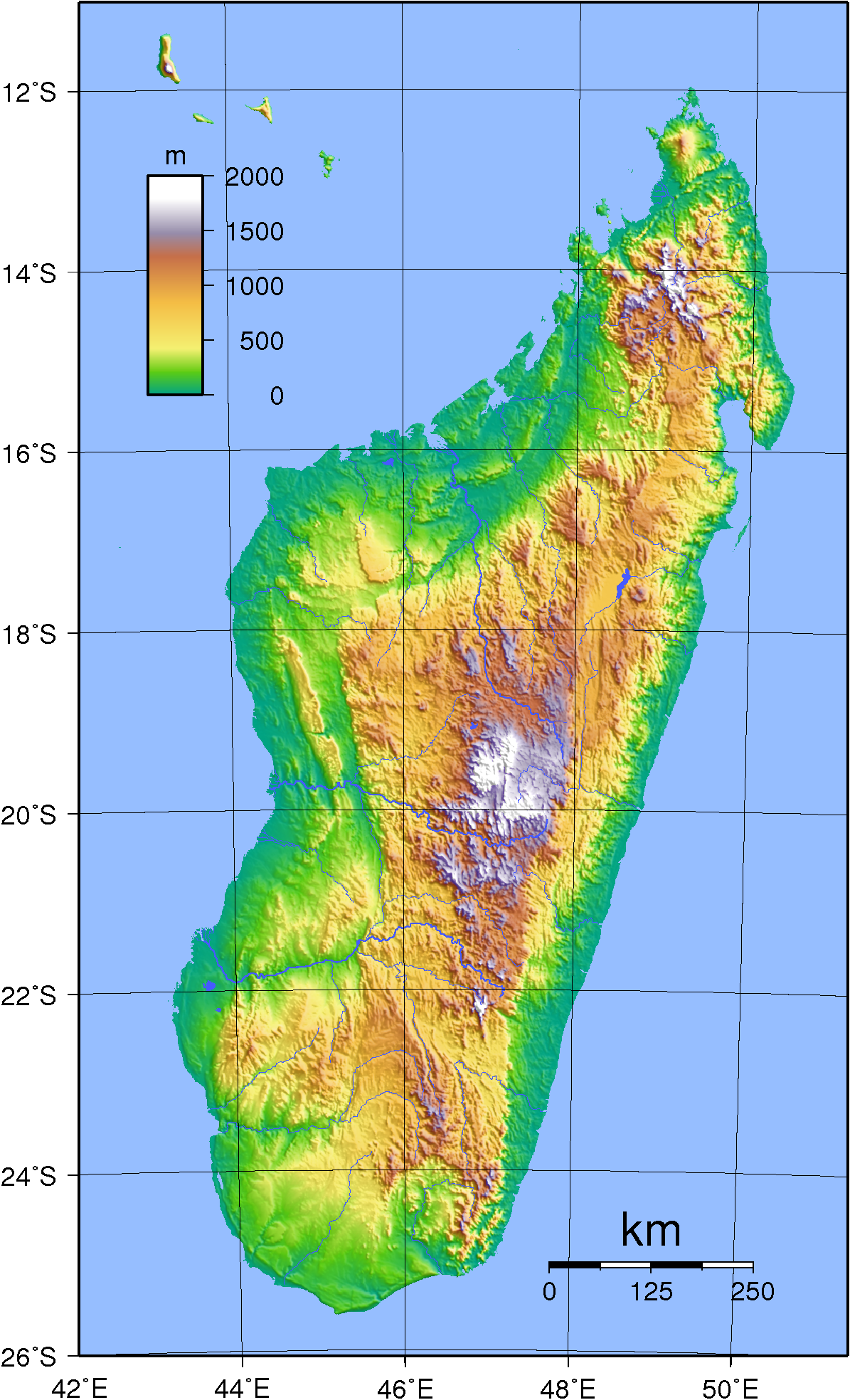
An enlargeable topographic map of Madagascar

Geography of Madagascar

- Madagascar is: a megadiverse island country
- Location:
  - Eastern Hemisphere and Southern Hemisphere
  - Africa (off its east coast)
    - East Africa
    - Southern Africa
  - Indian Ocean
  - Time zone: East Africa Time (UTC+03)
  - Extreme points of Madagascar
    - High: Maromokotro 2,876 m (9,436 ft)
    - Low: Indian Ocean 0 m
  - Land boundaries: none
  - Coastline: Indian Ocean 4,828 km
- Population of Madagascar: 19,683,000 - 49th most populous country
- Area of Madagascar: 587,041 km^{2}
- Atlas of Madagascar

=== Environment of Madagascar ===
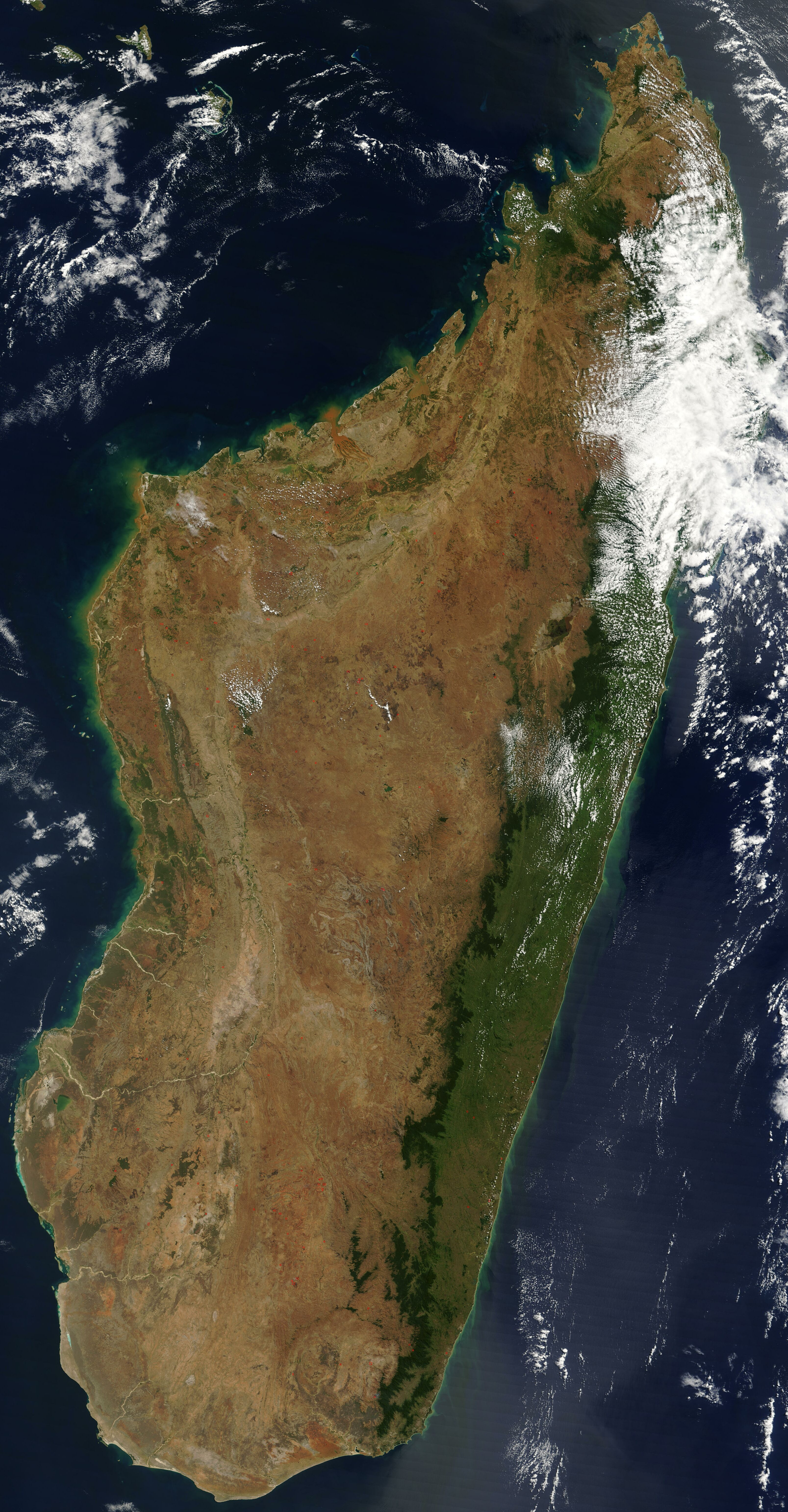
An enlargeable satellite image of Madagascar

- Climate of Madagascar
  - Climate change in Madagascar
- Deforestation in Madagascar
- Illegal logging in Madagascar
- Ecoregions in Madagascar
- Geology of Madagascar
- Protected areas of Madagascar
  - Biosphere reserves in Madagascar
  - National parks of Madagascar
- Wildlife of Madagascar
  - Fauna of Madagascar
    - Birds of Madagascar
    - Mammals of Madagascar

==== Natural geographic features of Madagascar ====
Landforms of Madagascar

- Glaciers in Madagascar: none
- Mountains of Madagascar
  - Volcanoes in Madagascar
- Rivers of Madagascar
- World Heritage Sites in Madagascar

=== Regions of Madagascar ===
==== Ecoregions of Madagascar ====
List of ecoregions in Madagascar

- Ecoregions in Madagascar

==== Administrative divisions of Madagascar ====
Administrative divisions of Madagascar

- Provinces of Madagascar
  - Regions of Madagascar
    - Districts of Madagascar
- Capital of Madagascar: Antananarivo
- Cities of Madagascar

=== Demography of Madagascar ===
Demographics of Madagascar

== Government and politics of Madagascar ==
Politics of Madagascar

- Form of government: semi-presidential representative democratic republic
- Capital of Madagascar: Antananarivo
- Elections in Madagascar
- Political parties in Madagascar

=== Branches of the government of Madagascar ===
Government of Madagascar

==== Executive branch of the government of Madagascar ====
- Head of state: President of Madagascar, Michael Randrianirina
- Head of government: Prime Minister of Madagascar, Mamitiana Rajaonarison

==== Legislative branch of the government of Madagascar ====
- Parliament of Madagascar (bicameral)
  - Upper house: Senate of Madagascar (suspended)
  - Lower house: National Assembly of Madagascar

==== Judicial branch of the government of Madagascar ====
Court system of Madagascar

=== Foreign relations of Madagascar ===
Foreign relations of Madagascar

- Diplomatic missions in Madagascar
- Diplomatic missions of Madagascar

==== International organization membership ====
The Republic of Madagascar is a member of:

- African, Caribbean, and Pacific Group of States (ACP)
- African Development Bank Group (AfDB)
- African Union (AU)
- Common Market for Eastern and Southern Africa (COMESA)
- Food and Agriculture Organization (FAO)
- Group of 77 (G77)
- Indian Ocean Commission (InOC)
- International Atomic Energy Agency (IAEA)
- International Bank for Reconstruction and Development (IBRD)
- International Chamber of Commerce (ICC)
- International Civil Aviation Organization (ICAO)
- International Criminal Court (ICCt)
- International Criminal Police Organization (Interpol)
- International Development Association (IDA)
- International Federation of Red Cross and Red Crescent Societies (IFRCS)
- International Finance Corporation (IFC)
- International Fund for Agricultural Development (IFAD)
- International Labour Organization (ILO)
- International Maritime Organization (IMO)
- International Monetary Fund (IMF)
- International Olympic Committee (IOC)
- International Organization for Migration (IOM)
- International Organization for Standardization (ISO) (correspondent)
- International Red Cross and Red Crescent Movement (ICRM)
- International Telecommunication Union (ITU)
- International Telecommunications Satellite Organization (ITSO)
- International Trade Union Confederation (ITUC)
- Inter-Parliamentary Union (IPU)
- Multilateral Investment Guarantee Agency (MIGA)
- Nonaligned Movement (NAM)
- Organisation internationale de la Francophonie (OIF)
- Organisation for the Prohibition of Chemical Weapons (OPCW)
- Southern African Development Community (SADC)
- United Nations Conference on Trade and Development (UNCTAD)
- United Nations Educational, Scientific, and Cultural Organization (UNESCO)
- United Nations High Commissioner for Refugees (UNHCR)
- United Nations Industrial Development Organization (UNIDO)
- Universal Postal Union (UPU)
- World Confederation of Labour (WCL)
- World Customs Organization (WCO)
- World Federation of Trade Unions (WFTU)
- World Health Organization (WHO)
- World Intellectual Property Organization (WIPO)
- World Meteorological Organization (WMO)
- World Tourism Organization (UNWTO)
- World Trade Organization (WTO)

=== Law and order in Madagascar ===
Law of Madagascar

- Cannabis in Madagascar
- Constitution of Madagascar
- Human rights in Madagascar
  - Abortion in Madagascar
  - LGBT rights in Madagascar
  - Human Trafficking in Madagascar
- Law enforcement in Madagascar

=== Military of Madagascar ===
Military of Madagascar

- Command
  - Commander-in-chief: President of Madagascar
- Forces
  - Army of Madagascar
  - Navy of Madagascar
  - Air Force of Madagascar

=== Local government in Madagascar ===
Local government in Madagascar

== History of Madagascar ==
History of Madagascar

== Culture of Madagascar ==
Culture of Madagascar

- Architecture of Madagascar
- Cuisine of Madagascar
- Ethnic groups of Madagascar
- Languages of Madagascar
- Malagasy naming customs
- National symbols of Madagascar
  - Coat of arms of Madagascar
  - Flag of Madagascar
  - National anthem of Madagascar
- People of Madagascar
- Prostitution in Madagascar
- Public holidays in Madagascar
- Religion in Madagascar
  - Christianity in Madagascar
  - Hinduism in Madagascar
  - Islam in Madagascar
- Women in Madagascar
- World Heritage Sites in Madagascar

=== Art in Madagascar ===
- Cinema of Madagascar
- Literature of Madagascar
- Music of Madagascar

=== Sports in Madagascar ===
Sports in Madagascar

- Football in Madagascar
- Madagascar at the Olympics

== Economy and infrastructure of Madagascar ==
Economy of Madagascar

- Economic rank, by nominal GDP (2007): 127th (one hundred and twenty seventh)
- Agriculture in Madagascar
  - Aquaculture in Madagascar
- Communications in Madagascar
  - Internet in Madagascar
- Companies of Madagascar
- Currency of Madagascar: Ariary
  - ISO 4217: MGA
- Health care in Madagascar
- Mining in Madagascar
  - Visa policy of Madagascar
- Tourism in Madagascar
- Transport in Madagascar
  - Airports in Madagascar
  - Driving in Madagascar
  - Rail transport in Madagascar

== Education in Madagascar ==
Education in Madagascar

== See also ==
Madagascar

- List of international rankings
- List of Madagascar-related topics
- Member state of the United Nations
- Outline of Africa
- Outline of geography
