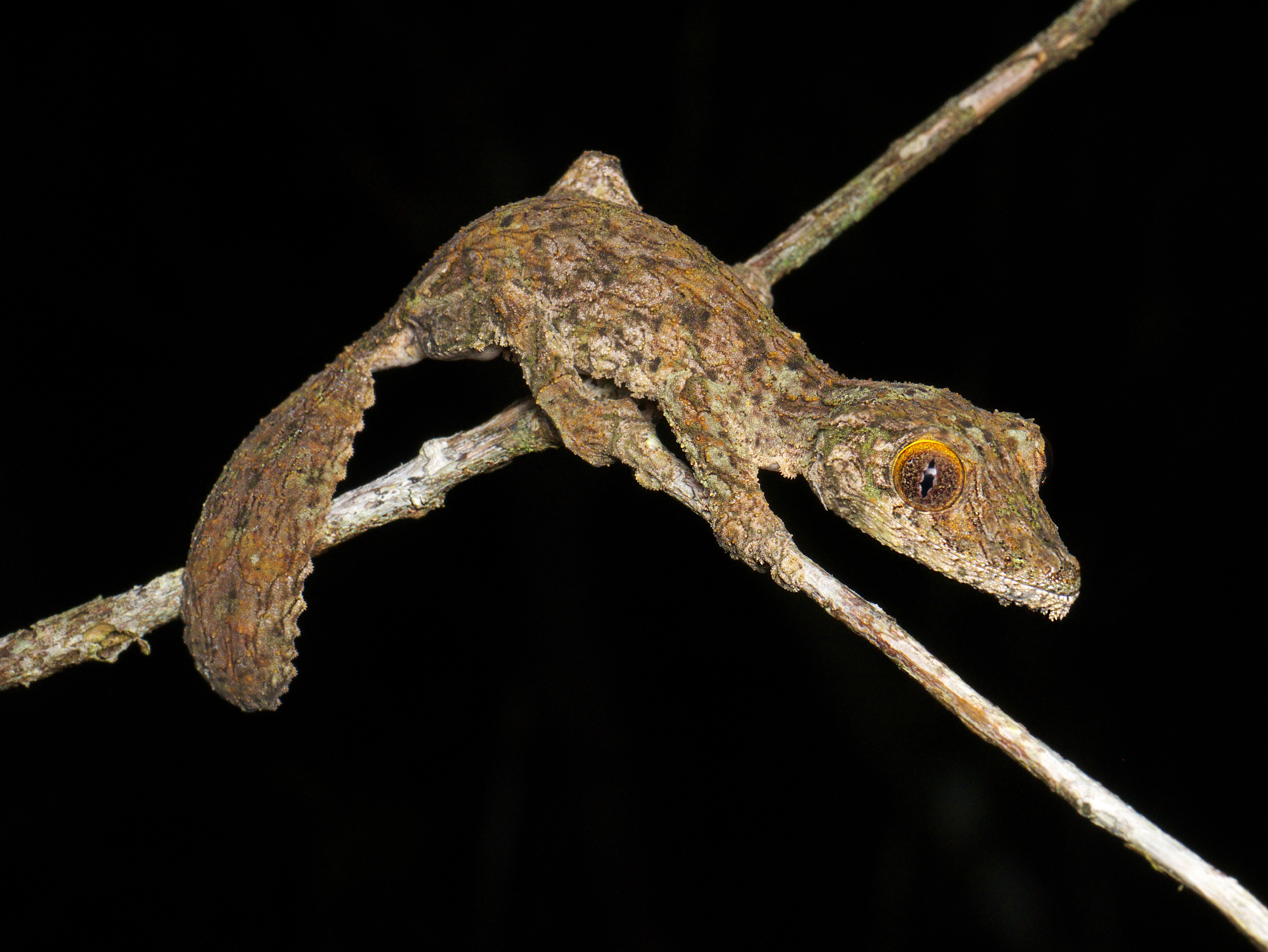
- from Vohimana Reserve, Andasibe
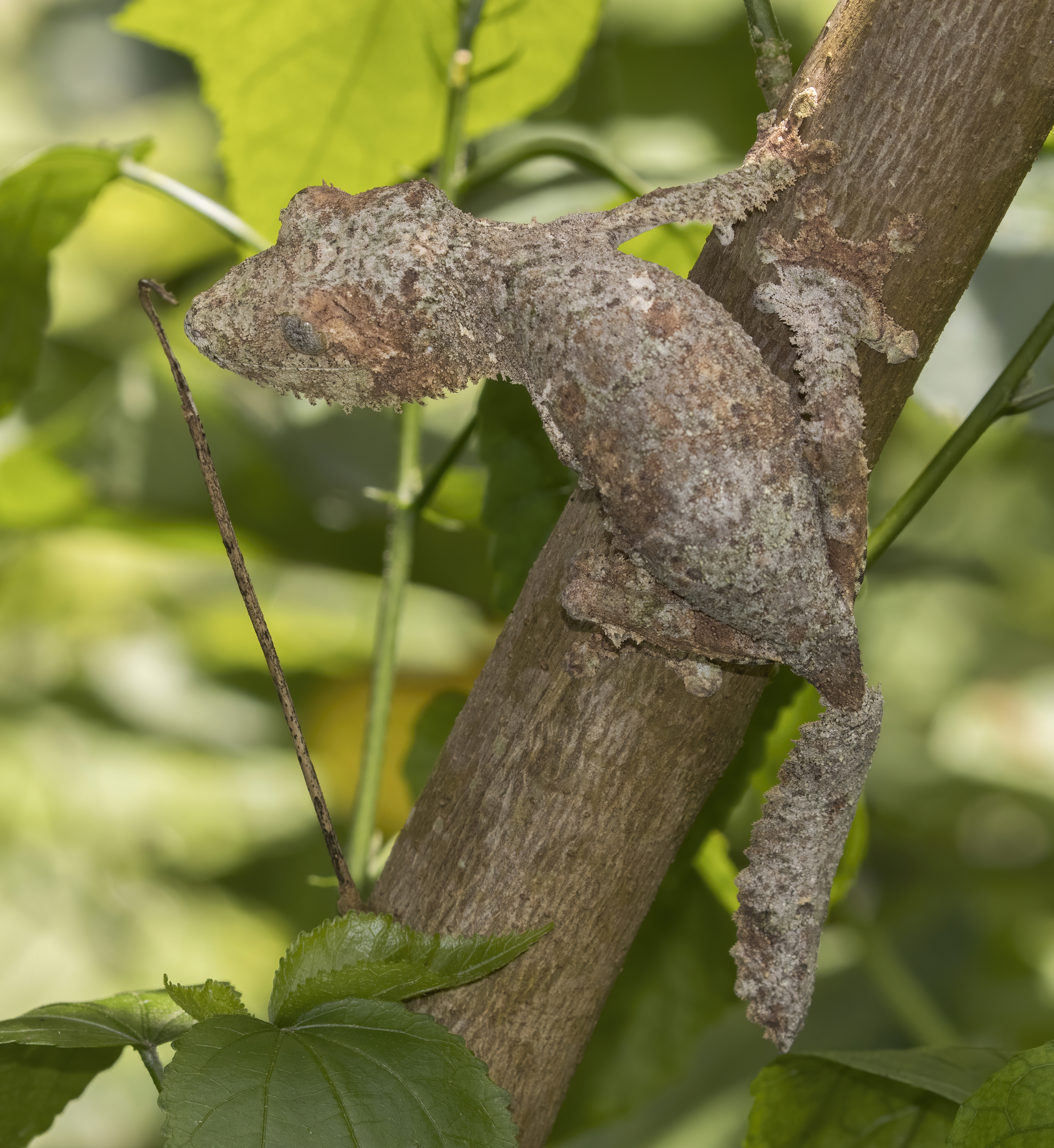
- from Montagne d'Ambre National Park both U. sikorae

Conservation status
- Least Concern (IUCN 3.1)

Scientific classification
- Kingdom: Animalia
- Phylum: Chordata
- Class: Reptilia
- Order: Squamata
- Suborder: Gekkota
- Family: Gekkonidae
- Genus: Uroplatus
- Species: U. sikorae

Binomial name
- Uroplatus sikorae (Boettger, 1913)
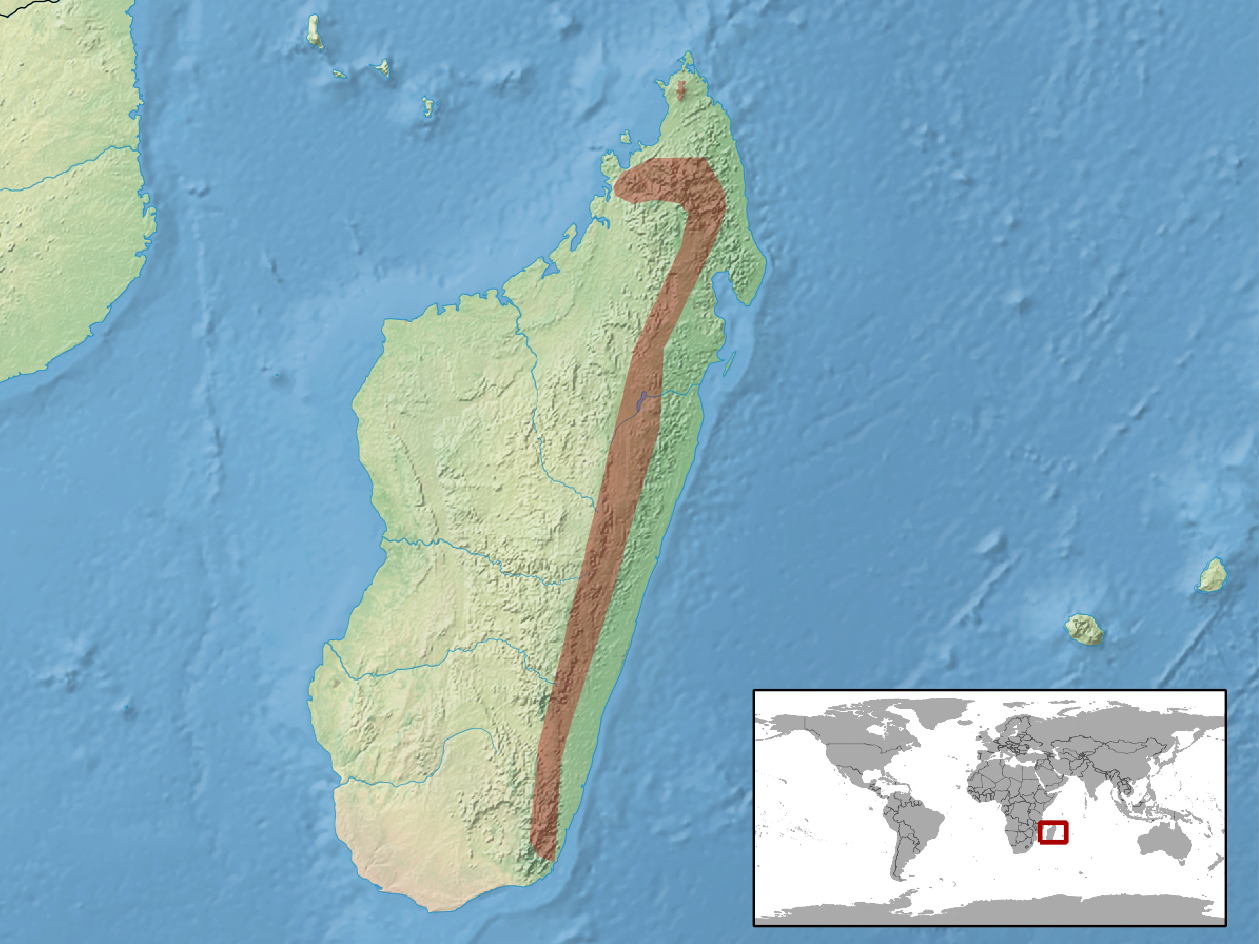
- Geographic range of U. sikorae in Madagascar

Synonyms
- Uroplates sikorae Boettger, 1913; Uroplatus fimbriatus sikorae — Mertens, 1933; Uroplatus sikorae — Glaw & Vences, 1994

= Uroplatus sikorae =

Species of lizard

Uroplatus sikorae, commonly referred to as the mossy leaf-tailed gecko or the southern flat-tail gecko, is a species of lizard in the family Gekkonidae. The species is endemic to Madagascar. It is a CITES II protected animal due to habitat loss.

== Etymology ==
The specific name, sikorae, is a Latinization of the surname of Franz Sikora, an Austrian fossil-hunter and explorer of Madagascar.

== Taxonomy ==
The species was first described by German zoologist Oskar Boettger but not published until three years after his death. Its common name refers to the mossy-like camouflage patterns and colors of the lizard's skin. The whole complex of U. sikorae is in need of taxonomic revision and probably contains numerous new, undescribed species.

The genus Uroplatus contains 14 species endemic to Madagascar. The species Uroplatus sameiti was considered to be a subspecies of U. sikorae until 2007, when it was proposed to be elevated to species level on the basis of its pale oral mucosa, in contrast to the dark oral mucosa of U. sikorae. Subsequent publications have maintained this separate status, which has now also been verified molecularly. However, in the most recent review of the taxonomy of the genus Uroplatus, it was revealed that the different colour of the mouth is not diagnostic of these two species, as some U. sikorae species were found to share the light oral pigmentation. The diagnosis of these species based on morphology remains difficult.

Phylogenically, U. sikorae has been placed within a monophyletic complex consisting of three other species of Uroplatus: U. fimbriatus, U. giganteus, U. henkeli, and U. sameiti. This complex represents the larger species of the genus.

== Distribution and habitat ==
Uroplatus sikorae is endemic to Madagascar. These geckos can be found in primary and secondary forests of the Eastern and central tropical forests of Madagascar.

== Description ==
The mossy leaf-tailed gecko ranges in size from 15 to 20 centimetres (6 to 8 in) when measured from nose to base of the tail. Their eyes are large and lidless, and have yellow sclera with elliptical pupils, suited for the gecko's nocturnal habits. As with all Uroplatus geckos, the tail is dorso-ventrally flattened. U. sikorae has coloration developed as camouflage, most being grayish brown to black or greenish brown with various markings meant to resemble tree bark, down to the lichens and moss found on the bark.

U. sikorae has flaps of skin, running the length of its body, head and limbs, known as the dermal flap, which it can lay against the tree during the day, scattering shadows, and making its outline practically invisible. Additionally, the gecko has a limited ability to alter its skin color to match its surroundings.

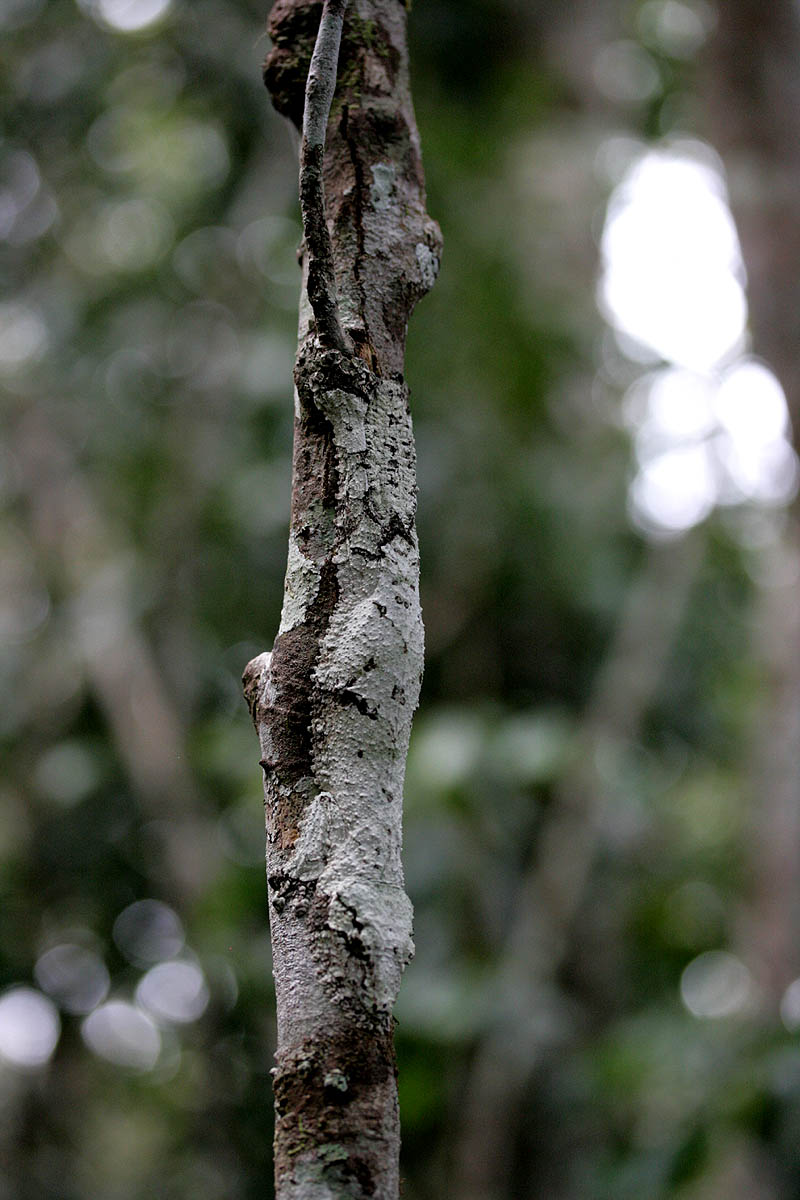
Analamazaotra Forest Reserve, Anadasibe

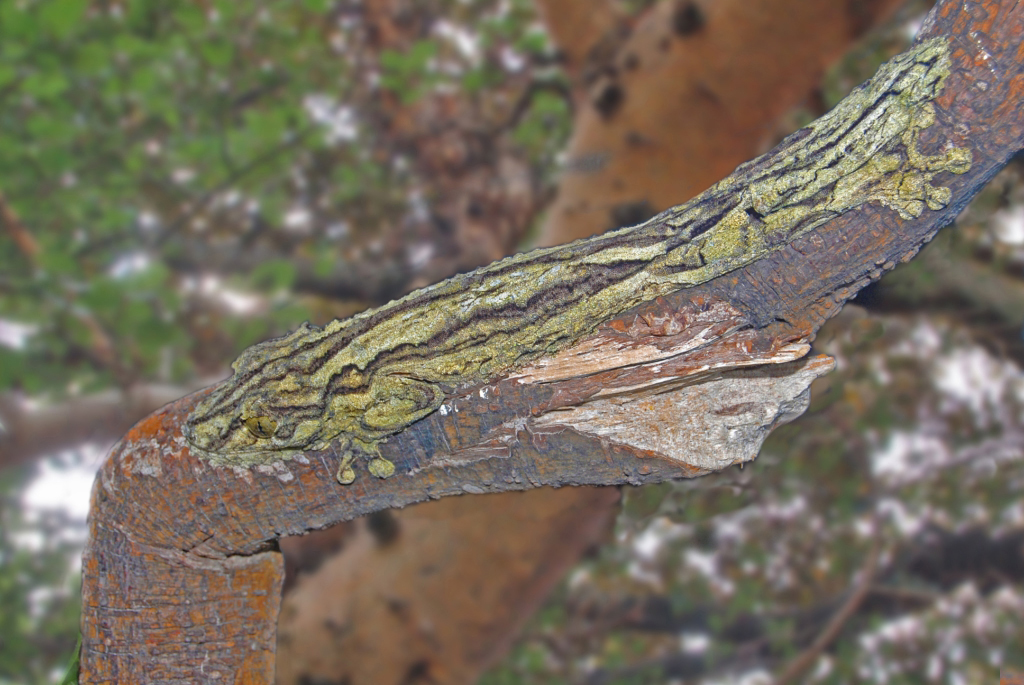
unknown location, appears to be undescribed species/subspecies

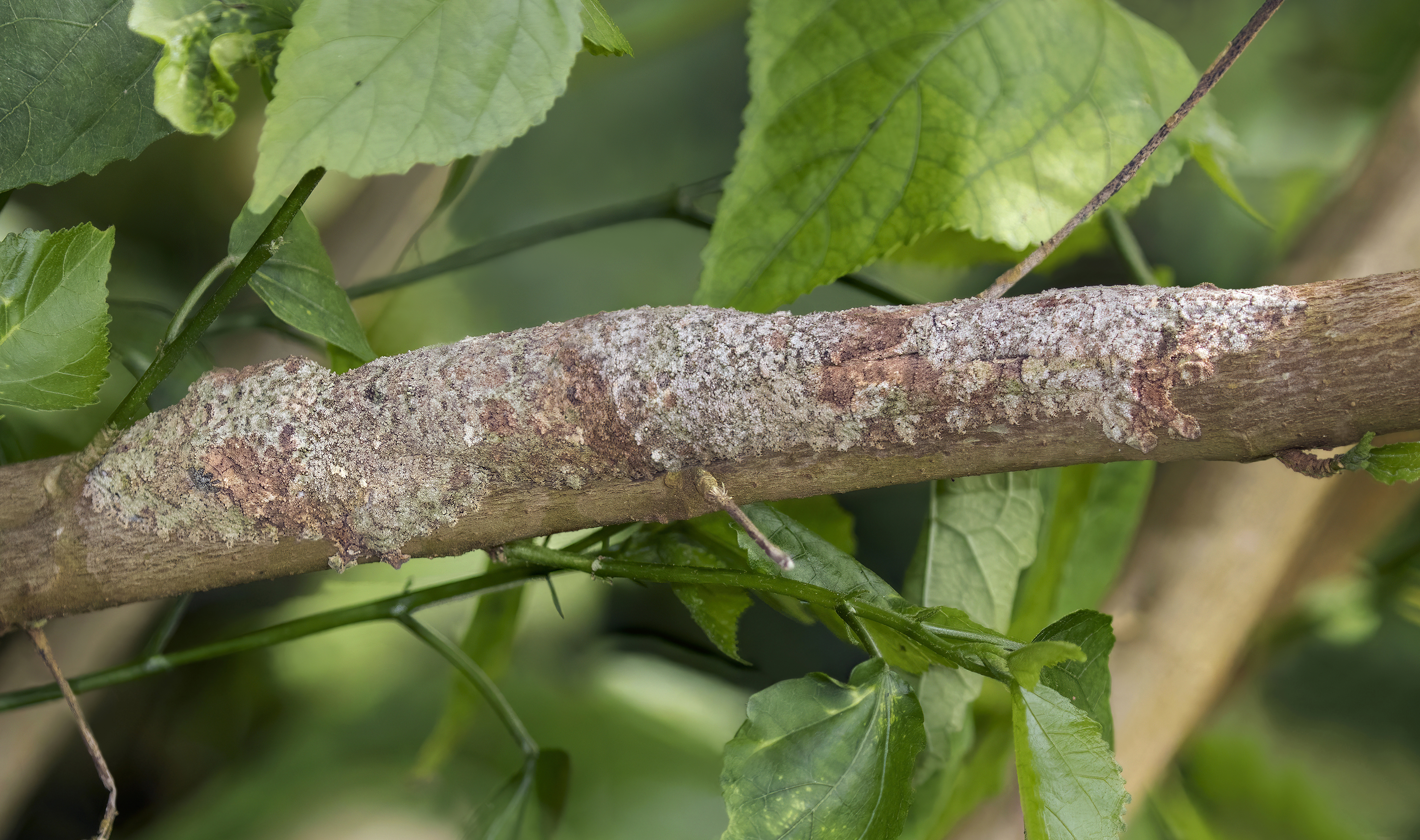
hidden on branch, Montagne d’Ambre

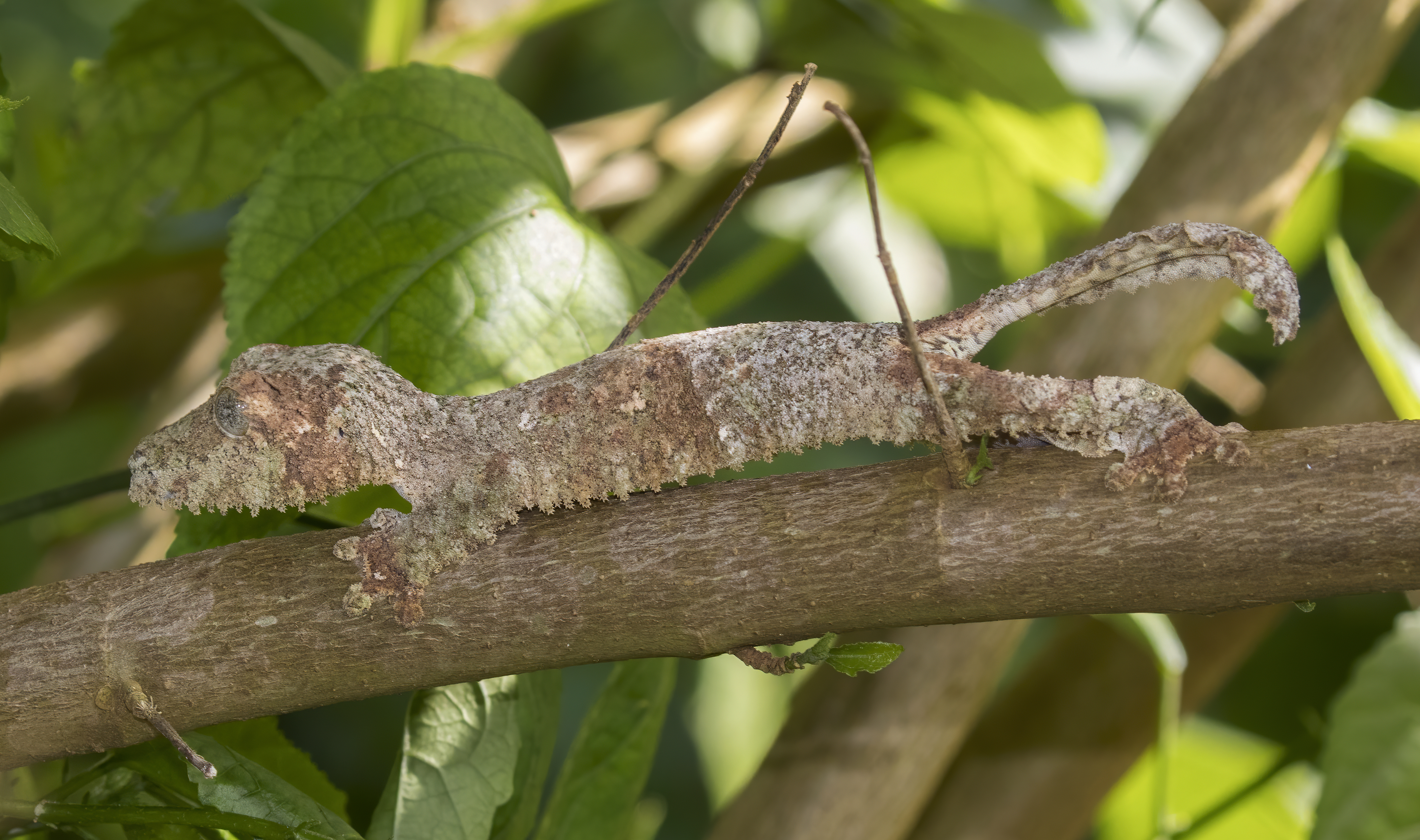
revealing itself, Montagne d’Ambre

== Biology and behavior ==
Mossy leaf-tailed geckos are nocturnal and arboreal. These geckos rely on their natural camouflage as they dwell among the trees. They spend most of the daylight hours hanging vertically on tree trunks, head down, resting. During the night, they will venture from their daylight resting spots, and go off in search of prey. It has the ability to change its skin color to match its surroundings and possesses dermal flaps which break up its outline when at rest. Mossy leaf-tailed geckos are insectivores eating insects, arthropods, and gastropods.

== Captivity ==
The mossy leaf-tailed gecko is uncommon in captivity and often kept in breeding pairs or trios. They eat a variety of appropriately sized insects including crickets and moths. If breeding is successful in captivity, eggs will be laid every 30 days and take 90 days to hatch.

== Threats ==
Habitat destruction and deforestation in Madagascar is the primary threat to this animal's future as well as collection for the pet trade. The World Wide Fund for Nature (WWF) lists all of the Uroplatus species on their "Top ten most wanted species list" of animals threatened by illegal wildlife trade, because of them "being captured and sold at alarming rates for the international pet trade". It is a CITES Appendix 2 protected animal.
