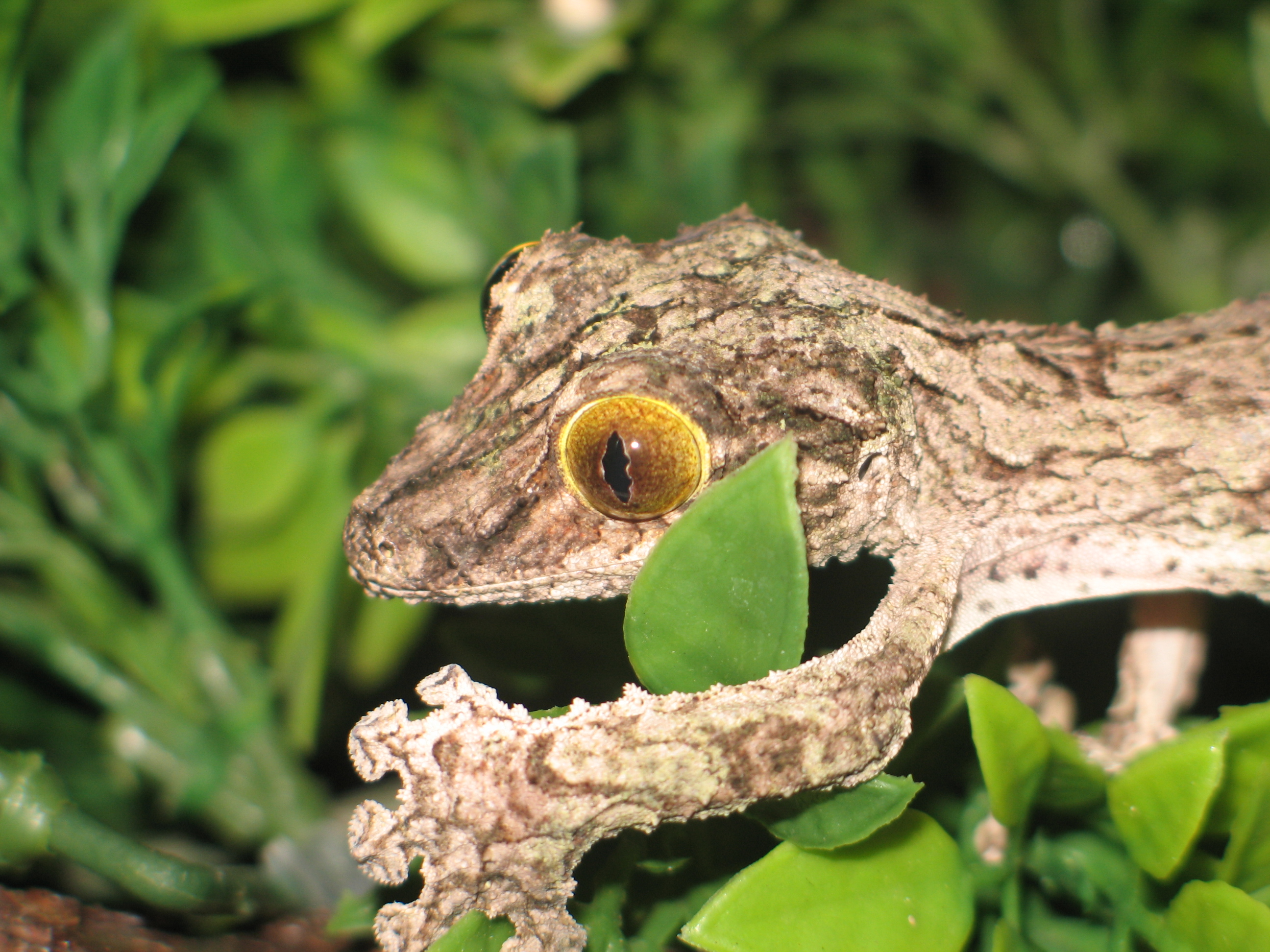

Conservation status
- Least Concern (IUCN 3.1)

Scientific classification
- Kingdom: Animalia
- Phylum: Chordata
- Class: Reptilia
- Order: Squamata
- Suborder: Gekkota
- Family: Gekkonidae
- Genus: Uroplatus
- Species: U. sameiti

Binomial name
- Uroplatus sameiti Böhme & Ibisch, 1990
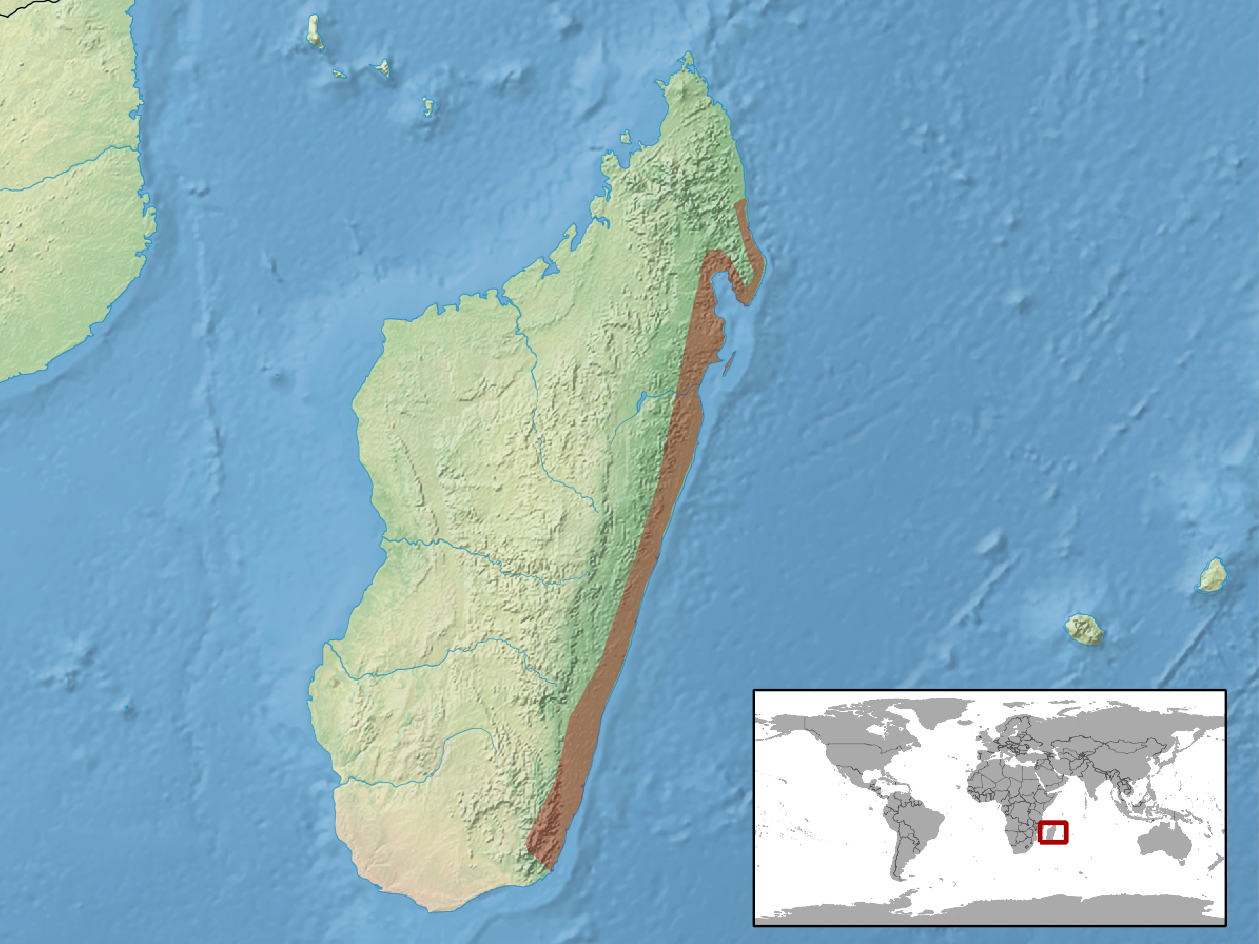
- Geographic range of U. sameiti in Madagascar

= Uroplatus sameiti =

Species of lizard

Uroplatus sameiti is a species of leaf-tailed gecko. Like all members of the genus Uroplatus, U. sameiti is endemic to Madagascar, and is found in primary and secondary forests on the island. It has the ability to change its skin colour to match its surroundings and possesses dermal flaps which break up its outline when at rest.

It is a CITES II protected animal due to habitat loss and over-collection for the pet trade.

== Taxonomy and etymology ==
The generic name, Uroplatus, is a Latinisation of two Greek words: οὐρά (ourá, meaning "tail") and πλατύς (platys, meaning "flat"). The specific name is a Latinisation of the name Joachim Sameit.

The genus Uroplatus contains 14 species endemic to Madagascar. U. sameiti was originally described as a subspecies of U. sikorae, to which it is closely related, based on the light colouration of its oral mucosa. Subsequent analysis has shown that this is not a diagnostic feature for distinguishing between these two highly similar species however, and more research will be needed to produce reliable morphological characters with which these two species may be distinguished.

Phylogenically, U. sameiti has been placed within a monophyletic complex consisting of three other species of Uroplatus: U. fimbriatus, U. giganteus, U. henkeli, and U. sikorae. This complex represents the larger species of the genus.

== Description ==
U. sameiti are nocturnal and arboreal geckos. Their eyes are large, lidless, and have yellow sclera with elliptical pupils, suited for the gecko's nocturnal habits. This species ranges in size from 6 to 8 inches (15 to 20 cm) when measured from nose to base of the tail. They spend most of the daylight hours hanging vertically on tree trunks, head down, resting. During the night, they will venture from their daylight resting spots, and go off in search of prey.

As with all Uroplatus geckos, the tail is dorso-ventrally flattened. U. sameiti has colouration developed as camouflage, most being grayish brown to black or greenish brown with various markings meant to resemble tree bark; down to the lichens and moss found on the bark. U. sameiti has flaps of skin, running the length of its body, head and limbs, known as the dermal flap, which it can lay against the tree during the day, scattering shadows, and making its outline practically invisible. Additionally, the gecko has a limited ability to alter its skin colour to match its surroundings.

== Diet ==
U. sameiti are insectivores eating insects, other arthropods, and also land snails.

== Distribution and habitat ==
Uroplatus sameiti is found exclusively in the lowland humid and littoral forest of eastern Madagascar.

== Captivity ==
It is unknown how many of these geckos are present in the pet trade, due to their overall similarity with U. sikorae, and the new confusion that has arisen in light of the non-diagnostic nature of their oral mucosa. However, like U. sikorae, this species is typically kept in breeding pairs or trios. They eat a variety of appropriately sized insects including crickets and moths, and will also eat snails if provided. If breeding is successful in captivity, eggs will be laid every 30 days and take 90 days to hatch.

== Threats ==
Habitat destruction and deforestation in Madagascar is the primary threat to this animal's future as well as collection for the pet trade. The World Wide Fund for Nature (WWF) lists all of the Uroplatus species on their "Top ten most wanted species list" of animals threatened by illegal wildlife trade, because of it "being captured and sold at alarming rates for the international pet trade". It is a CITES Appendix 2 protected animal.
