= Human trafficking in Mauritius =

In 2009 Mauritius was not a major source for children subjected to trafficking in persons, specifically conditions of forced prostitution within the country. Secondary school-age girls and, to a lesser extent, younger girls from all areas of the country, including from Rodrigues Island, were induced into prostitution, often by their peers, family members, or businessmen offering other forms of employment. Taxi drivers were known to provide transportation and introductions for both the girls and the clients. Girls and boys whose mothers engaged in prostitution were reportedly forced into prostitution at a young age. Some drug-addicted women were forced into prostitution by their boyfriends, who serve as their pimps. In Great Britain, two Malagasy nationals were convicted in 2009 of holding a small number of Mauritian nationals, as well as citizens of other countries, in conditions of forced labor; this appeared to be an isolated case of transnational human trafficking involving Mauritian citizens. Students from all over the world were forced into prostitution within the country.

In 2009 the Government of Mauritius fully complied with the minimum standards for the elimination of trafficking. Mauritius sustained its strong efforts to identify, investigate, and prosecute incidents of trafficking during 2009. The Mauritius Police Force increased its offerings of anti-trafficking training programs for police officers, and continued its awareness campaign in schools and villages. The government's efforts to coordinate among all relevant ministries, however, remained lacking, leading to inconsistent provision of protective and investigative services to trafficking victims.

The U.S. State Department's Office to Monitor and Combat Trafficking in Persons placed the country in "Tier 2" in 2017. By 2023, it was on the Tier 2 watch list.

The country ratified the 2000 UN TIP Protocol in September 2003.

== Prosecution (2009) ==
In 2011, the government prosecuted 14 cases of forced labour involving domestic workers and six cases of sex trafficking under the anti-trafficking law. The government has taken swift efforts to clamp down on prostitution and child sex tourism. The Mauritian government demonstrated increased anti-trafficking law enforcement efforts, vigorously investigating and prosecuting cases of human trafficking throughout the year. The “Combating of Trafficking in Persons Act of 2009” prohibits all forms of trafficking for adults and children and prescribes penalties of up to 15 years' imprisonment for convicted offenders. In addition, the Child Protection Act of 2005 prohibits all forms of child trafficking and prescribes punishment of up to 15 years' imprisonment for convicted offenders; the Judicial Provisions Act of 2008 increased the maximum prescribed punishment for child trafficking offenses to 30 years' imprisonment. All of the aforementioned penalties are sufficiently stringent and commensurate with those prescribed for other serious crimes. From arrest to sentencing of offenders, cases of child trafficking typically took 18 to 24 months to resolve. In October 2009, the government used the Children Protection Act to convict and sentence a woman to ten years' imprisonment for subjecting two underage Mauritian girls to prostitution in 2007. Also during the year, the Mauritius Police Force's Minors Brigade, which carries out all investigations involving trafficked children, completed the investigation into a 2007 case of a grandmother who allegedly forced her granddaughter into prostitution and referred it to the Director of Public Prosecution (DPP) for action. In 2009, the DPP referred for trial the January 2008 case of a man and woman charged with inducing their 12-year-old niece into prostitution; the case was scheduled to be heard in April 2010. The Minors Brigade utilized a database for tracking criminal trafficking cases, as well as awareness campaigns carried out in the community. In 2009 and early 2010, the Officer in Charge of the brigade conducted five training sessions on best practices for combating human trafficking for all 32 of the Minors Brigade's officers. The Police training school conducted anti-trafficking sessions during a two-week program for 182 senior police officers. Seventy government officials also received training on the commercial sexual exploitation of children from a local NGO.

== Protection (2009) ==
The government sustained its protection of child trafficking victims during the reporting period, providing funding to NGO's running victim shelters on a reimbursable basis – $6 per day for the protection of each child, including victims of trafficking. CDU officials regularly referred abused and exploited children to these organizations for shelter and other assistance. The Minor's Brigade systematically refers all cases of identified children in prostitution to the CDU for victim assistance; in 2009, the brigade referred two such children for protective services. The CDU did not, however, refer all cases of child prostitution identified by its officers to the Minors Brigade for possible investigation. The government-funded, NGO-run drop-in center for sexually abused children, which provided counseling to six girls engaged in prostitution in 2009, advertised its services through bumper stickers, a toll-free number, and community outreach; its social worker continued to promote the services in schools and local communities. Nonetheless, due to the drop-in center's lack of shelter facilities and the often crowded conditions at NGO shelters, comprehensive protective services were not always readily available to all victims identified within the country. Though the MOWR acquired land and obtained funding to construct a residential center for victims of child commercial sexual exploitation in late 2008, construction of the facility has not yet begun. The ministry operated a 24-hour hotline for reporting cases of sexual abuse that received two reported cases of child prostitution in 2009.

Mauritius has a formal protocol on the provision of assistance to all victims of sexual abuse; children victimized by commercial sexual exploitation are accompanied to the hospital by a child welfare officer, and police work in conjunction with this officer to obtain a statement. Medical treatment and psychological support were readily available at public clinics and NGO centers in Mauritius. The Child Protection (Amendment) Act of 2008 established a child mentoring scheme to provide support and rehabilitation to children in distress, including children engaged in prostitution; the government did not utilize this program to assist children engaged in or at risk of prostitution during the reporting period. The government encourages victims' assistance in the investigation and prosecution of trafficking crimes, and ensures that victims are not inappropriately incarcerated, fined, or otherwise penalized solely for unlawful acts committed as a direct result of being trafficked.

== Prevention (2009) ==
The government made notable efforts to prevent the sex trafficking of children and reduce the demand for commercial sex acts during the year. The Police Family Protection Unit and the Minor's Brigade, in conjunction with the CDU, continued its widespread awareness campaign on child abuse and child rights at schools and community centers that included a session on the dangers and consequences of engaging in prostitution; this campaign reached over 16,372 persons in 2009, including 1,574 parents from tourist regions where children have greater risk of trafficking. Law enforcement and child welfare officials conducted surveillance at bus stops, night clubs, gaming houses, and other places frequented by children to identify and interact with students who were at a high risk of sex trafficking. The Ministry of Tourism, Leisure, and External Communications sustained its distribution of pamphlets to hotels and tour operators regarding the responsibility of the tourism sector to combat child sex trafficking. Communication and coordination among the relevant ministries, however, continued to be lacking. There were reports in 2009 that Mauritian nationals may be participating in child sex tourism in Nosy Be, Madagascar; the government took no specific action to address this problem during the year. Inspections conducted by the Ministry of Labor's 30 labor officers and nine trainee officers in 2009 yielded no cases of forced labor or exploitative child labor.
