= Human trafficking in Madagascar =

Madagascar ratified the 2000 UN TIP Protocol in September 2005.

In 2010 Madagascar was a source country for women and children subjected to human trafficking, specifically conditions of forced labor and forced prostitution. An estimated 6,000 Malagasy women were currently employed as domestic workers in Lebanon, with a smaller number in Kuwait. Many of these women came from rural areas and were often illiterate or poorly educated, making them more vulnerable to deception and abuse at the hands of recruitment agencies and employers. Detailed information regarding situations of forced labor and other abuses experienced by Malagasy domestic workers in Lebanon came to light during the year. Numerous trafficking victims returning to Madagascar reported harsh working conditions, physical violence, sexual harassment and assault, confinement to the home, confiscation of travel documents, and withholding of salaries. Eight deaths were reported among this population in 2009.

Children, mostly from rural areas, were subject to conditions of domestic servitude, commercial sexual exploitation, and forced labor in mining, fishing, and agriculture within the country. Most child trafficking occurred with the involvement of family members, but friends, transport operators, tour guides, and hotel workers also facilitated the enslavement of children. A child sex tourism problem exists in coastal cities, including Tamatave, Nosy Be, and Diego Suarez, as well as the capital city of Antananarivo; some children were recruited for work in the capital using fraudulent offers of employment as waitresses and maids before being forced into the commercial sex trade on the coast. The main sources of child sex tourists were France, Germany, and Switzerland. Parents sold young women into marriages, some of which were short-term, often for significant sums of money.

In 2010, the Government of Madagascar did not fully comply with the minimum standards for the elimination of trafficking; however, it made significant efforts to do so. Since the March 2009 coup, combating human trafficking received little attention in Madagascar; the focus on the abuse of domestic workers in Lebanon did not result in any commensurate governmental response to the problem. The government's anti-trafficking efforts were insufficient and decreased during the year - especially in the areas of prosecuting trafficking offenders, identifying and protecting victims, and raising public awareness of the problem - while the prevalence of officials' complicity in human trafficking became more evident. Lack of political will, institutional capacity, and relevant training remained significant impediments to improved anti-trafficking performance, particularly impacting the effectiveness of law enforcement activities; the government failed to investigate or prosecute traffickers in 2009.

The U.S. State Department's Office to Monitor and Combat Trafficking in Persons placed the country in the "Tier 2 Watchlist" in 2010, 2017 and 2023.

== Prosecution (2010) ==
The Malagasy government's anti-trafficking law enforcement efforts diminished over the years, as it reported no investigations or prosecutions of trafficking offenders. Anti-Trafficking Law No. 2007-038 prohibits all forms of human trafficking, though it only prescribes punishments for sex trafficking; these range from two years' to life imprisonment, penalties that are sufficiently stringent and commensurate with those prescribed for other serious crimes, such as rape. Article 262 of the Labor Code criminalizes labor trafficking, for which it prescribes inadequate penalties of one to three years' imprisonment. Decree 2007-563 prohibits and prescribes minimal punishments of up to two years' imprisonment for various forms of child trafficking, including prostitution, domestic servitude, and forced labor. The government has yet to use its anti-trafficking law to punish traffickers. Poor coordination among ministries, a lack of data sharing between officials at regional and national levels, and the lack of a presidential decree codifying and mandating its use at the provincial level hindered the law's implementation. The government did not investigate or prosecute cases of forced labor during the reporting period.

The Government of Madagascar nominally suspended the work of several employment agencies implicated in human trafficking during the year, but did not follow through on its commitment to conduct inspections of these businesses. In November 2009, the government instituted a ban on sending workers to Lebanon, but it was poorly implemented, possibly due to complicity of high-ranking government officials; up to 10 labor recruitment agencies were reportedly owned by civil servants in the Ministry of Labor. Government officials also reportedly assist unlicensed recruitment agencies in obtaining fraudulent travel documents. Anecdotal evidence indicates there was also official complicity in permitting organized child prostitution rings to operate, particularly in Nosy Be. Local police remained hesitant to pursue child sex trafficking and child sex tourism offenses, possibly because of deep-rooted corruption, pressures from the local community, or fear of an international incident. The government took no action against official complicity in human trafficking during the reporting period.

== Protection (2010) ==
The Malagasy government made weak efforts to ensure that victims were provided access to necessary services and it did not operate specific victim assistance programs. The majority of trafficking victims identified in 2009 were assisted by NGO-run centers. Madagascar lacks procedures to proactively identify trafficking victims among vulnerable populations or refer victims for care. However, the Ministry of Health's local-level Child Rights Protection Networks - which grew through a partnership with UNICEF to include 761 communes in 2009 - brought together government institutions, law enforcement, and NGOs to partially fill this role. These networks coordinated child protection activities, identified and reported abuse cases, and assisted some trafficking victims in accessing social and legal services. Victims who returned from Lebanon were immediately confined to a psychiatric institution and not provided with appropriate social or legal services. Madagascar's honorary consul in Beirut made limited attempts to mediate with labor agencies and refer Malagasy victims to a Beirut-based NGO shelter. The government sent an official from its embassy in Paris to Beirut to research the abuse of Malagasy domestic workers in Lebanon, but did not take measures to initiate bilateral engagement with the Government of Lebanon regarding protection of and legal remedies for exploited workers. The government did not penalize trafficking victims for unlawful acts committed as a direct result of their being trafficked, but did not show evidence that it encouraged them to assist in the investigation and prosecution of their exploiters. The government did not provide legal alternatives to the removal of victims to countries where they would face hardship or retribution.

== Prevention (2010) ==
The government's efforts to prevent trafficking decreased during the year, particularly in the area of public awareness raising. The President's Inter-Ministerial Anti-Trafficking Committee ceased functioning in early 2009. The government's Antananarivo-based Manjary Soa Center withdrew an unknown number of children from the worst forms of child labor and provided them with education or vocational training. Two additional centers opened in Toliara and Toamasina in 2009 and were the only programs fully funded by the government to combat child labor. Although nine Regional Committees to Fight Child Labor worked to increase coordination among government entities, NGOs, and ILO/IPEC under the framework of the National Action Plan for the Fight Against Child Labor, the Ministry of Labor's five child labor inspectors were insufficient to cover areas beyond Antananarivo or in informal economic sectors. The ministry conducted no complaint-driven child labor inspections and provided no information on incidences of child labor, if any, uncovered during regular inspections. The government continued to distribute to arriving international passengers fliers and a customs booklet containing a full-page warning of the consequences of child sex tourism. In 2009, the government charged a French national with rape and corruption of a minor after he paid for sex acts with several young girls.

== See also ==
- Human rights in Madagascar
