= Human rights in Madagascar =

Human rights in Madagascar are protected under the national constitution. However, the extent to which such rights are reflected in practice is subject to debate. The 2009 Human Rights Report by the United States Department of State noted concerns regarding the suspension of democratic electoral processes as the result of recent political unrest. Furthermore, reports of corruption, arbitrary arrest and child labor highlight the prevalence of human rights issues in the country.

== Constitution and statutory responses ==
The Constitution of Madagascar was adopted in 2010. It addresses the notion of universal suffrage, individual rights and the freedom of speech.

Laws regarding a minimum age for employment as well as the prohibition of child labor were passed.

== International treaties ==
Madagascar's stances on international human rights treaties are as follows:

International treaties

Treaty	Organization	Introduced	Signed	Ratified
Convention on the Prevention and Punishment of the Crime of Genocide	United Nations	1948	-	-
International Convention on the Elimination of All Forms of Racial Discrimination	United Nations	1966	1967	1969
International Covenant on Economic, Social and Cultural Rights	United Nations	1966	1970	1971
International Covenant on Civil and Political Rights	United Nations	1966	1969	1971
First Optional Protocol to the International Covenant on Civil and Political Rights	United Nations	1966	1969	1971
Convention on the Non-Applicability of Statutory Limitations to War Crimes and Crimes Against Humanity	United Nations	1968	-	-
International Convention on the Suppression and Punishment of the Crime of Apartheid	United Nations	1973	-	1977
Convention on the Elimination of All Forms of Discrimination against Women	United Nations	1979	1980	1989
Convention against Torture and Other Cruel, Inhuman or Degrading Treatment or Punishment	United Nations	1984	2001	2005
Convention on the Rights of the Child	United Nations	1989	1990	1991
Second Optional Protocol to the International Covenant on Civil and Political Rights, aiming at the abolition of the death penalty	United Nations	1989	-	-
International Convention on the Protection of the Rights of All Migrant Workers and Members of Their Families	United Nations	1990	-	-
Optional Protocol to the Convention on the Elimination of All Forms of Discrimination against Women	United Nations	1999	2000	-
Optional Protocol to the Convention on the Rights of the Child on the Involvement of Children in Armed Conflict	United Nations	2000	2000	2004
Optional Protocol to the Convention on the Rights of the Child on the Sale of Children, Child Prostitution and Child Pornography	United Nations	2000	2000	2004
Convention on the Rights of Persons with Disabilities	United Nations	2006	2007	-
Optional Protocol to the Convention on the Rights of Persons with Disabilities	United Nations	2006	2007	-
International Convention for the Protection of All Persons from Enforced Disappearance	United Nations	2006	2007	-
Optional Protocol to the International Covenant on Economic, Social and Cultural Rights	United Nations	2008	2009	-
Optional Protocol to the Convention on the Rights of the Child on a Communications Procedure	United Nations	2011	-	-

== Issues ==
=== Censorship ===
Accusations of media censorship have risen due to the alleged restrictions on the coverage of government opposition. During the leadership conflict, Ravalomanana ordered the closure of "Viva TV", which was owned by his opponent, Rajoelina. There are concerns of spyware and surveillance on the opposition, and arbitrary detainments of journalists and politicians. Opposition parties are also sometimes restricted.

Peaceful protests are sometimes violently suppressed by the authorities.

=== Ethnic Minorities ===
Madagascar is an ethnically diverse country. While the majority of the population is Malagasy, they are divided into 18 tribes. The Merina people are the largest, living in the highlands, and they are sometimes in conflict with the Cotiers, or coastal people, who have more African origins. 20,000 of the Karana people, with historic origins of India, are stateless. Precise demographic information in Madagascar is unavailable. In 2017, an amendment to the nationality law allowed children to receive citizenship from their mother if she was married to a foreign man (which previously had been prohibited).

Mob violence and kidnapping and ransoming of ethnic minorities, like people of Indian origin, are common, because it is believed they are rich.

=== Equality ===
Women's suffrage was officially recognized in 1959. However violence against women and human trafficking continues to be an issue in society. Pregnant young women and girls often face barriers in education, with schools banning them, considering them a "bad example". Women continue to face barriers in the workforce. People with albinism are sometimes kidnapped and murdered, due to superstition.

There are no anti-discrimination laws for LGBTQ people.

=== Legal system ===
The existence of key legal principles such as the rule of law and due process, is in question due to the increase in arbitrary and politically motivated arrests during the leadership conflict. In December 2014, the List of Goods Produced by Child Labor or Forced Labor indicated that children in Madagascar engaged in three activities, namely vanilla production, stone quarrying, and sapphire mining.

According to Amnesty International, jails are heavily overcrowded, and often have inadequate food, and poor sanitation and medical care. Prisoners sometimes face lengthy pretrial detention, and denial of bail without justification. Citizens are also sometimes unaware of their rights. The US State Department, in their Madagascar report of 2022, highlighted excessive force sometimes used by security forces. Due to corruption, there is often inadequate punishment in these cases.

=== Poverty ===
The people of Madagascar are afflicted by extreme levels and rates of poverty. As of 2005, the Eastern coast of the country had astoundingly high poverty rates of around 80% while urban areas are just over 50%. Over 20% of the population lived on under $11.25 per day and over 80% of the population on under $15.00 per day as of 2010.

The country has seen major improvements in literacy rates. Generally, a correlation exists between literacy rates and poverty. Should the progress in increasing the number of literate Madagascans continue, poverty rates should begin to decline respectively.

== Historical situation ==
The following chart shows Madagascar's ratings since 1972 in the Freedom in the World reports, published annually by Freedom House. A rating of 1 is "free"; 7, "not free".^{1}

Historical ratings

Year	Political Rights	Civil Liberties	Status	Head of State^{2}
1972	5	3	Partly Free	Philibert Tsiranana
1973	5	4	Partly Free	Gabriel Ramanantsoa
1974	5	4	Partly Free	Gabriel Ramanantsoa
1975	5	5	Partly Free	Gabriel Ramanantsoa
1976	6	5	Not Free	Didier Ratsiraka
1977	5	5	Partly Free	Didier Ratsiraka
1978	6	6	Not Free	Didier Ratsiraka
1979	6	6	Not Free	Didier Ratsiraka
1980	7	6	Not Free	Didier Ratsiraka
1981	6	6	Not Free	Didier Ratsiraka
1982^{3}	6	6	Not Free	Didier Ratsiraka
1983	5	6	Partly Free	Didier Ratsiraka
1984	5	6	Partly Free	Didier Ratsiraka
1985	5	6	Partly Free	Didier Ratsiraka
1986	5	5	Partly Free	Didier Ratsiraka
1987	5	5	Partly Free	Didier Ratsiraka
1988	5	5	Partly Free	Didier Ratsiraka
1989	5	4	Partly Free	Didier Ratsiraka
1990	4	4	Partly Free	Didier Ratsiraka
1991	4	4	Partly Free	Didier Ratsiraka
1992	4	4	Partly Free	Didier Ratsiraka
1993	2	4	Partly Free	Didier Ratsiraka
1994	2	4	Partly Free	Albert Zafy
1995	2	4	Partly Free	Albert Zafy
1996	2	4	Partly Free	Albert Zafy
1997	2	4	Partly Free	Norbert Ratsirahonana
1998	2	4	Partly Free	Didier Ratsiraka
1999	2	4	Partly Free	Didier Ratsiraka
2000	2	4	Partly Free	Didier Ratsiraka
2001	2	4	Partly Free	Didier Ratsiraka
2002	3	4	Partly Free	Didier Ratsiraka
2003	3	3	Partly Free	Marc Ravalomanana
2004	3	3	Partly Free	Marc Ravalomanana
2005	3	3	Partly Free	Marc Ravalomanana
2006	4	3	Partly Free	Marc Ravalomanana
2007	4	3	Partly Free	Marc Ravalomanana
2008	4	3	Partly Free	Marc Ravalomanana
2009	6	4	Partly Free	Marc Ravalomanana
2010	6	4	Partly Free	Andry Rajoelina
2011	6	4	Partly Free	Andry Rajoelina
2012	6	4	Partly Free	Andry Rajoelina
2013	5	4	Partly Free	Andry Rajoelina
2014	4	4	Partly Free	Andry Rajoelina
2015	3	4	Partly Free	Hery Rajaonarimampianina
2016	3	4	Partly Free	Hery Rajaonarimampianina
2017	3	4	Partly Free	Hery Rajaonarimampianina
2018	3	4	Partly Free	Hery Rajaonarimampianina
2019	3	3	Partly Free	Rivo Rakotovao
2020	3	4	Partly Free	Andry Rajoelina
2021	3	4	Partly Free	Andry Rajoelina
2022	3	4	Partly Free	Andry Rajoelina
2023	3	4	Partly Free	Andry Rajoelina

== See also ==
- Human trafficking in Madagascar
- Internet censorship and surveillance in Madagascar
- Politics of Madagascar
- 2006 Malagasy coup d'état attempt

== Notes ==
1. Note that the "Year" signifies the "Year covered". Therefore the information for the year marked 2008 is from the report published in 2009, and so on.
2. As of 1 January.
3. The 1982 report covers 1981 and the first half of 1982, and the following 1984 report covers the second half of 1982 and the whole of 1983. In the interest of simplicity, these two aberrant "year and a half" reports have been split into three year-long reports through interpolation.
