= Malagasy naming customs =

Personal naming conventions in Madagascar

People in Madagascar have a variety of naming practices. While most Malagasy have binomial names, some have mononyms. While permitted to pass down names patronymically to the next generation, it is not a universal practice. Malagasy do not have European-style surnames. Most Malagasy names are formed from a unique personal name given in early childhood. Christian Malagasy also bear baptismal names, usually French, in addition to their Malagasy-language names. Malagasy may also add names or change their names entirely at particular points throughout their lives. Some Malagasy people practice teknonymy (being named after one's children) and necronymy (giving a new name to the dead to avoid the taboo of saying a dead person's name while alive). Because Malagasy names can be agglutinative, and because women in some regions add their husbands' names to their own, many people from Madagascar are well known for their lengthy names, and nicknames are commonly used.

== History ==
Before the 20th century, there were no family names in Madagascar but only personal names. Prior to Christian evangelization on the island, most names were mononyms. These names could be changed over the course of one's life. In some parts of Madagascar, patronymics were not used because it was taboo (fady) to state the name of a dead person and because some names are traditionally masculine or feminine.

French colonial authorities deplored the practice of name changing because it made it difficult for law enforcement to track down criminal suspects. However, the French did not impose a family name system, and in 1962, the legislature of newly independent Madagascar declared that adoption of family names would be discretionary and that name changing would be maintained with limits.

== Law ==
Madagascans are not obliged by law to have a family name. Individuals are permitted by law to change their names, and it is common to do so, although it is allowed only once after age 21, specifically to mitigate risks associated with individuals trying to evade law enforcement.

== Name changing ==
Among the Betsileo people—one of Madagascar's largest ethnic groups—name changes are mechanisms by which individuals record reaching adulthood and achieving status and respect. Name changes, which may happen multiple times in an individual's life, may be done in local ceremonies and acknowledged by local communities and elders even if the individual does not officially register the name change. (Among the Betsileo, the divergence between registered birth names and names in use can cause confusion when engaging with the state.)

Most Malagasy receive nicknames as toddlers, which may be given as a diminutive of a given name, a nickname based on a personal trait, or a "detractive" name chosen to ward off evil spirits or bad luck. At a certain point, a child receives a more permanent given name based on personal characteristics. These names may reflect physical appearance, emotions, terms of endearment, historical moments, places of birth, or months of the year and days of the week. This name is often conferred in a special ceremony.

This name may be used until one's 20s or 30s. After becoming parents, individuals may receive teknonyms, for example Baban'i Baholo (father of Baholo). The next step into full adulthood is to choose a new name, with the freedom of self-naming corresponding to being recognized as a full and senior member of society. A changed name might not be acknowledged and used within an individual's community. For example, the community might consider someone too young for a particular name. Among the Betsileo, ancestral names are commonly chosen.

Susan Kus and Victor Raharijaona offer the Malagasy ruler Andrianampoinimerina, whose names were recorded by Jesuit priest François Callet, as an example. He had the name Imboasalama ("vigorous/healthy little dog") as a child. As a young warrior, he was given the name Ombalahibemaso ("big-eyed bull"), and as he consolidated power in Imerina he took on the name Andrianampoinimerina ("the noble desired in the heart of Imerina").

Outside of Christian areas, traditional practice among the Zafimaniry, a subgroup of the Betsileo, involved ceremonially giving a necronym to dead individuals, which would allow living persons to speak and re-use the name the dead person had in life.

== Name structures ==
Malagasy names incorporate a mélange of foreign names, mostly French. Christians often use biblical names for their children, while Muslim names are also used within that communion. However, these names are modified based on the morphology and phonology of the Malagasy language. For example, John is rendered as Jaonina or Jaona, and might include the honorific particle Ra-, the word andriana (meaning "lord"), or both, resulting in names like Randrianarijaona. Names can become very long due to Malagasy's agglutinative structure. At 36 characters, Andrianampoinimerinatompokoindrindra, which means "the prince who was given birth by Imerina and who is my real lord", may be the longest known Malagasy name.

Binomial naming has replaced mononyms to become the most common structure, with a traditional Malagasy name paired with a Christian or foreign-language name. (Some have more than two names.) But for people with two or more names, none functions as a European-style patronymic surname, and if a name is shared among members of a family, its transmission can be broken by name changes. Names may be transmitted to family members through shared root words that are modified. In central Madagascar, women may take on their husbands' names after marriage.

For people in particular jobs, certain honorifics may come to be considered part of a person's name, such as Ramose for teachers, Rapasy for pastors and Rapresy for presidents.

== Notes and references ==
=== Bibliography ===
- Kus, Susan; Raharijaona, Victor (2023). "From 'sprinkling' a blessing to audaciously appropriating a name: Some reflections concerning personal names and naming in the central highlands of Madagascar". In Ndlovu, S. (ed.). Personal Names and Naming from an Anthropological-Linguistic Perspective. Anthropological Linguistics. De Gruyter. ISBN 978-3-11-075929-7.
- Regnier, Denis (2016). "Naming and name changing in postcolonial Madagascar" (PDF). Pacific Studies. 39 (1–2): 201–215.
