= Prostitution in Madagascar =

Prostitution in Madagascar is legal, and common, especially in tourist areas. Related activities such as soliciting, procuring, living off the earnings of prostitution or keeping a brothel are prohibited. Public Order laws are also used against prostitutes. There are recent laws against "consorting with female prostitutes". People caught paying for sex with children under 14 can face criminal penalties of up to 10 years imprisonment. This is strictly enforced against foreign tourists. As well as in the tourist areas, prostitution also occurs around the mining towns of the interior such as Ilakaka and Andilamena. It was estimated that there were 167,443 sex workers in the country in 2014.

Sex workers report law enforcement is arbitrary and abusive. Extortion by the police is also reported.

Prostitution first came to the island after colonisation by the French in the late 1800s. In modern times it is increasing due to an increase in tourism and the poverty suffered by most people in the county.

Madagascar is a destination for sex tourism, including child sex tourism. Human trafficking and child prostitution are problems in the country.

== Sex tourism ==
Madagascar has become a recognised destination for both adult and child sex tourism, particularly for French and Italian males. The main areas in the country for sex tourism are Antananarivo (the capital), Nosy Be, Île Sainte-Marie, Mahajanga, Diego-Suarez and Toamasina.

=== Nosy Be ===
In the 1990s the government awarded a tuna fishing contract to the Japanese. The trawlers docked at Nosy Be, an island off the north coast of Madagascar. Prostitution grew up around this fishing industry, with prostitutes migrating to the island from all over the country. When tourism to Madagascar started, Nosy Be became a popular destination because of the established sex trade. Subsequently, most of the "all-inclusive" resorts have been built on the island. This is the premier location for Europeans, predominantly French, some of whom come to the country for sex tourism. It has been estimated that 70% of the island's female population work in prostitution, half of them underage.

== Child prostitution ==
In addition to being a destination for child sex tourism, Malagasy men also use underage prostitutes. A study by UNICEF found that three quarters of the Malagasy men who use prostitutes go with underage girls.

Child sex tourism has increased in the country since Mozambique tightened is laws in this area.

Many families encourage their daughters to engage with white tourists for financial reasons. In some cases twelve and thirteen year olds are given French and Italian lessons in preparation for their work as prostitutes. Some girls in rural areas are sold as concubines, by their parents, to foreigners or wealthy cattle owners for a period of several years.

Police corruption means there is little action against the users of underage girls.

Several NGOs, such as the Collective for the Rights of the Child and Family (CDEF) and UNICEF, are working to improve the situation.

== Sexual health ==
Although Madagascar has a low HIV prevalence for a Sub-Saharan African country (0.2% in 2016), it has one of the highest rates of sexually transmitted infections (STIs) in the world.

Sex worker organisations, such as Fikambanaina Vehivavy Miavotena Toamasina (FIVEMITO) and Femmes Interessee au Development de Antalaha (FIDA) (which is partially funded by the World Bank), have reached agreements with local governments to issue sex workers over the age of 18 identity cards. These identity cards allow access to free healthcare.

In 2016, the HIV prevalence amongst sex workers was 5.5%.

== Sex trafficking ==
Madagascar is a source and destination country for women and children subjected to sex trafficking. Malagasy children, mostly from rural and coastal regions, and from impoverished families in urban areas, are exploited in child sex trafficking. Most child sex trafficking occurs with the involvement and encouragement of family members; however, tourist operators, hotels, taxi drivers, massage centres, and local adults in prostitution also facilitate this crime. Some children are fraudulently recruited for work in Antananarivo as waitresses and masseuses before being exploited in child sex trafficking. Reports suggest child sexual exploitation is most prevalent in tourist destinations and surrounding formal and informal mining sites.

NGOs previously reported government officials’ complicity in obtaining falsified national identity cards facilitates the child sex trafficking in Madagascar. Previous reports indicated child sex trafficking of boys was becoming more prevalent. Child domestic labour continues to be a problem and informal employment agencies recruit child domestic workers who Malagasy men exploit as child sex trafficking victims, while most child sex tourists are French and Italian nationals, and to a lesser extent, other Westerners and Comorians.

The United States Department of State Office to Monitor and Combat Trafficking in Persons ranks Madagascar as a "Tier 2 Watch List" country.
