= Foreign relations of Madagascar =

Madagascar has diplomatic relations with many countries, both individual bilateral relations and by virtue of its membership of African and other regional blocs. International aid has been received from the IMF and the World Bank, and a national environmental plan supported by the World Bank and USAID began in 1990.

== Regional relations ==
Madagascar historically has remained outside the mainstream of African affairs, although it is a member of the Indian Ocean Commission, the African Union, although its membership is suspended due to a coup, the Port Management Association of Eastern and Southern Africa (PMAESA), and the Non-Aligned Movement. Madagascar was admitted to the Southern African Development Community in 2004.

== Diplomatic relations ==
List of countries which Madagascar maintains diplomatic relations with:

#	Country	Date
1	France	25 June 1960
2	India	25 June 1960
3	United States	25 June 1960
4	Germany	26 June 1960
5	United Kingdom	27 June 1960
6	Israel	1 July 1960
7	Japan	5 July 1960
8	Panama	20 September 1960
9	Portugal	20 September 1960
10	Norway	27 October 1960
11	Netherlands	16 March 1961
12	Italy	30 May 1961
14	Switzerland	13 June 1961
15	Sweden	17 August 1961
14	Greece	26 September 1961
16	South Korea	25 June 1962
17	Pakistan	16 August 1962
18	Turkey	30 January 1963
19	Algeria	15 June 1964
20	Belgium	15 July 1964
21	Denmark	1964
22	Canada	7 January 1965
23	Spain	25 March 1966
24	Sierra Leone	5 November 1966
—	Holy See	24 December 1966
25	Luxembourg	13 January 1967
26	Austria	1967
27	Mauritius	27 August 1968
28	Romania	10 September 1968
29	Tunisia	12 March 1969
30	Egypt	23 February 1970
31	Serbia	4 June 1971
32	Nigeria	24 June 1971
33	Lesotho	7 December 1971
34	Chile	23 December 1971
35	Russia	29 September 1972
36	China	6 November 1972
37	North Korea	16 November 1972
38	Vietnam	19 December 1972
39	Tanzania	28 June 1973
40	Zambia	13 September 1973
41	Poland	28 November 1973
42	Kuwait	6 December 1973
43	Libya	9 February 1974
44	Cuba	11 April 1974
45	Democratic Republic of the Congo	26 July 1974
46	Australia	22 August 1974
47	Indonesia	13 December 1974
48	Mozambique	9 August 1975
49	Hungary	1 December 1975
50	Mexico	26 December 1975
51	Iraq	26 March 1976
52	Albania	28 April 1976
53	Czech Republic	5 May 1976
54	Bulgaria	15 June 1976
55	Comoros	12 November 1976
56	Finland	1 June 1977
57	Yemen	31 December 1977
58	Mongolia	11 May 1979
59	Laos	27 February 1980
60	Zimbabwe	19 October 1981
61	Iran	13 July 1983
62	Nicaragua	26 October 1984
63	Seychelles	12 April 1989
64	Singapore	31 January 1990
65	Thailand	30 November 1990
—	Sovereign Military Order of Malta	1990
66	Kyrgyzstan	26 March 1992
67	Kazakhstan	10 April 1992
68	Estonia	13 April 1992
69	Brunei	20 October 1992
70	Azerbaijan	26 May 1993
71	Belarus	28 May 1993
72	Ukraine	10 June 1993
73	Tajikistan	12 June 1993
74	Moldova	17 June 1993
75	Armenia	25 June 1993
76	South Africa	27 January 1994
77	Morocco	15 April 1994
78	Malaysia	6 April 1995
79	Colombia	15 June 1995
80	Turkmenistan	1 December 1995
81	Slovakia	16 February 1996
82	Brazil	7 October 1996
83	Cambodia	25 March 1997
84	Djibouti	13 August 1999
85	Argentina	20 July 2001
86	Sri Lanka	27 July 2001
87	Senegal	12 August 2002
88	North Macedonia	18 October 2002
89	Burkina Faso	14 October 2002
90	Mali	1 August 2003
91	Cape Verde	9 October 2003
92	Gambia	20 July 2004
93	Cyprus	3 March 2005
94	Namibia	13 July 2005
95	Botswana	August 2005
96	Iceland	22 September 2006
97	Croatia	27 September 2006
98	Slovenia	5 October 2006
99	Georgia	24 May 2007
100	Uruguay	29 August 2007
101	Ivory Coast	29 May 2008
102	Saudi Arabia	22 October 2008
103	Venezuela	17 November 2008
104	Republic of the Congo	17 September 2014
105	Togo	24 March 2015
106	Sudan	15 April 2015
107	Eswatini	21 October 2015
108	Mauritania	11 November 2015
109	Niger	13 January 2016
110	Oman	29 June 2016
111	United Arab Emirates	22 September 2016
112	Lebanon	5 May 2017
113	Eritrea	12 April 2017
114	Lithuania	19 September 2017
115	Rwanda	17 January 2018
116	Andorra	25 September 2018
117	Latvia	26 September 2018
118	Nepal	26 September 2018
119	Bangladesh	4 March 2020
120	Monaco	11 December 2020
121	Malta	22 September 2021
122	Qatar	24 September 2021
123	Dominican Republic	23 September 2022
124	Bahrain	23 September 2022
125	San Marino	1 February 2023
126	Ireland	6 March 2024
127	Angola	8 July 2024
128	Guinea-Bissau	30 July 2024
129	Ghana	24 September 2024
130	Burundi	26 September 2024
131	Philippines	4 February 2025
132	New Zealand	17 September 2025
133	Equatorial Guinea	31 March 2026
134	Guinea	7 April 2026
135	Ethiopia	Unknown
136	Uganda	Unknown

== Bilateral relations ==
International agencies being present in the country allows to react quickly to emergencies such as a food crisis.

=== Africa ===
Country	Formal Relations Began	Notes
Mauritius	27 August 1968	See Madagascar–Mauritius relations Both countries established diplomatic relations on 27 August 1968: Madagascar has an embassy in Port Louis.; Mauritius has an embassy in Antananarivo.
South Africa	27 January 1994	See Madagascar–South Africa relations Both countries established diplomatic relations on 27 January 1994. South Africa and Madagascar share maritime borders with each other.: Madagascar has an embassy in Pretoria and a consulate-general in Cape Town.; South Africa has an embassy in Antananarivo.
Sahrawi Arab Democratic Republic	29 January 1978	Madagascar maintained diplomatic relations with the Sahrawi Arab Democratic Republic from 29 January 1978 to 6 April 2005.

=== Americas ===
Country	Formal Relations Began	Notes
Canada	7 January 1965	See Canada–Madagascar relations Both countries established diplomatic relations on 7 January 1965: Canada is accredited to Madagascar from its high commission in Pretoria, South Africa.; Madagascar has an embassy in Ottawa.
Mexico	26 December 1975	Madagascar is accredited to Mexico from its embassy in Washington, D.C., United States and maintains an honorary consulate in Mexico City.; Mexico is accredited to Madagascar from its embassy in Pretoria, South Africa and maintains an honorary consulate in Antananarivo.
United States	26 June 1960	See Madagascar–United States relations Relations between the United States and Madagascar date to the middle 19th century. The two countries concluded a commercial convention in 1867 and a treaty of peace, friendship, and commerce in 1881. Traditionally warm relations suffered considerably during the 1970s, when Madagascar expelled the U.S. ambassador, the USA closed a NASA tracking station, allied with the USSR, and nationalized two U.S. oil companies. In 1980, relations at the ambassadorial level were restored. Throughout the troubled period, commercial and cultural relations remained active. In 1990, Madagascar was designated as a priority aid recipient, and assistance increased from $15 million in 1989 to $40 million in 1993. Recent U.S. assistance has contributed to a population census and family planning programs; conservation of Madagascar's remarkable biodiversity, private sector development, agriculture, democracy and governance initiatives; and media training. Madagascar became the first country with a Millennium Challenge Account compact when it signed an agreement worth $110 million in April 2006. The Ravalomanana government is especially positive about ties with the United States.: Madagascar has an embassy in Washington, DC.; United States has an embassy in Antananarivo.

=== Asia ===
Country	Formal Relations Began	Notes
China	6 November 1972	See China-Madagascar relations China and Madagascar established diplomatic relations on November 6, 1972.: China has an embassy in Antananarivo and a consulate-general in Toamasina.; Madagascar has an embassy in Beijing.
India	27 June 1960	See India–Madagascar relations India has had maritime links with Madagascar for several centuries. India opened a consulate general in Antananarivo in 1954. Upon Madagascar gaining independence in 1960, it was upgraded to an embassy. There are about 20,000 persons of Indian origin in Madagascar, including approximately 2,500 Indian passport holders.: India has an embassy in Antananarivo.; Madagascar has an embassy in New Delhi.
Indonesia	13 December 1974	See Indonesia–Madagascar relations: Indonesia has an embassy in Antananarivo.; Madagascar does not have an accreditation to Indonesia.
Turkey	30 January 1963	See Madagascar–Turkey relations: Madagascar is accredited to Turkey from its embassy in Rome, Italy.; Turkey has an embassy in Antananarivo.; Trade volume between the two countries was 76.5 million USD in 2019 (Malagasy exports/imports: 5.2/71.3 million USD).

=== Europe ===
Country	Formal Relations Began	Notes
Cyprus		Cyprus is accredited to Madagascar from its high commission in Pretoria, South Africa. and an honorary consulate in Antananarivo.; Madagascar does not have an accreditation to Cyprus.
Denmark	1964	Denmark is represented in Madagascar, through its embassy in Pretoria.; Denmark have a consulate in Antananarivo.
France	25 June 1960	See France–Madagascar relations both countries established diplomatic relations on 25 June 1960.: France has an embassy in Antananarivo.; Madagascar has an embassy in Paris and consulates-general in Marseille and Saint-Denis.
Germany	26 June 1960	See Germany–Madagascar relations Both countries established diplomatic relations on 26 June 1960: Germany has an embassy in Antananarivo.; Madagascar has an embassy in Berlin.
Greece	1962	Both countries established diplomatic relations in 1962: Greece is accredited to Madagascar from its embassy in Nairobi, Kenya.; Madagascar is accredited to Greece from its embassy in Rome, Italy.
Russia	29 September 1972	See Madagascar–Russia relations Both countries established diplomatic relations on 29 September 1972. During the 2009 Malagasy political crisis, Russia's Foreign Minister Sergey Lavrov stated that Russia is "concerned by the increased frequency of attempts on the African continent to resort to non-constitutional methods of solving internal political problems." He went on to say that, in addition to increasing economic and social problems, the use of force is of concern and runs counter to democratic principles, whilst affirming Russia's support of the African Union's position.: Madagascar has an embassy in Moscow.; Russia has an embassy in Antananarivo.
Serbia	9 December 1969	Both countries established diplomatic relations on 9 December 1969.: A number of bilateral agreements have been concluded and are in force between the two countries.; Madagascar is accredited to Serbia from its embassy in Rome, Italy.; Serbia is accredited to Madagascar from its Permanent Mission to the United Nations in New York City, United States.
United Kingdom	1960	See Madagascar–United Kingdom relations Malagasy President Hery Rajaonarimampianina with British Foreign Office Minister James Duddridge in London, November 2015. The UK established diplomatic relations with the United Kingdom on 27 June 1960.: Madagascar maintains an embassy in London.; The United Kingdom is accredited to Madagascar through its embassy in Antananarivo.; The UK administered Madagascar from 1942 to 1943, when Madagascar was transferred to France. Both countries share common membership of the International Criminal Court, the United Nations, and the World Trade Organization, as well as the Eastern and Southern Africa–UK Economic Partnership Agreement. Bilaterally the two countries have a Development Partnership.

== See also ==
- List of diplomatic missions in Madagascar
- List of diplomatic missions of Madagascar
- Visa policy of Madagascar
