= Madagascar–United States relations =

- Madagascar: United States

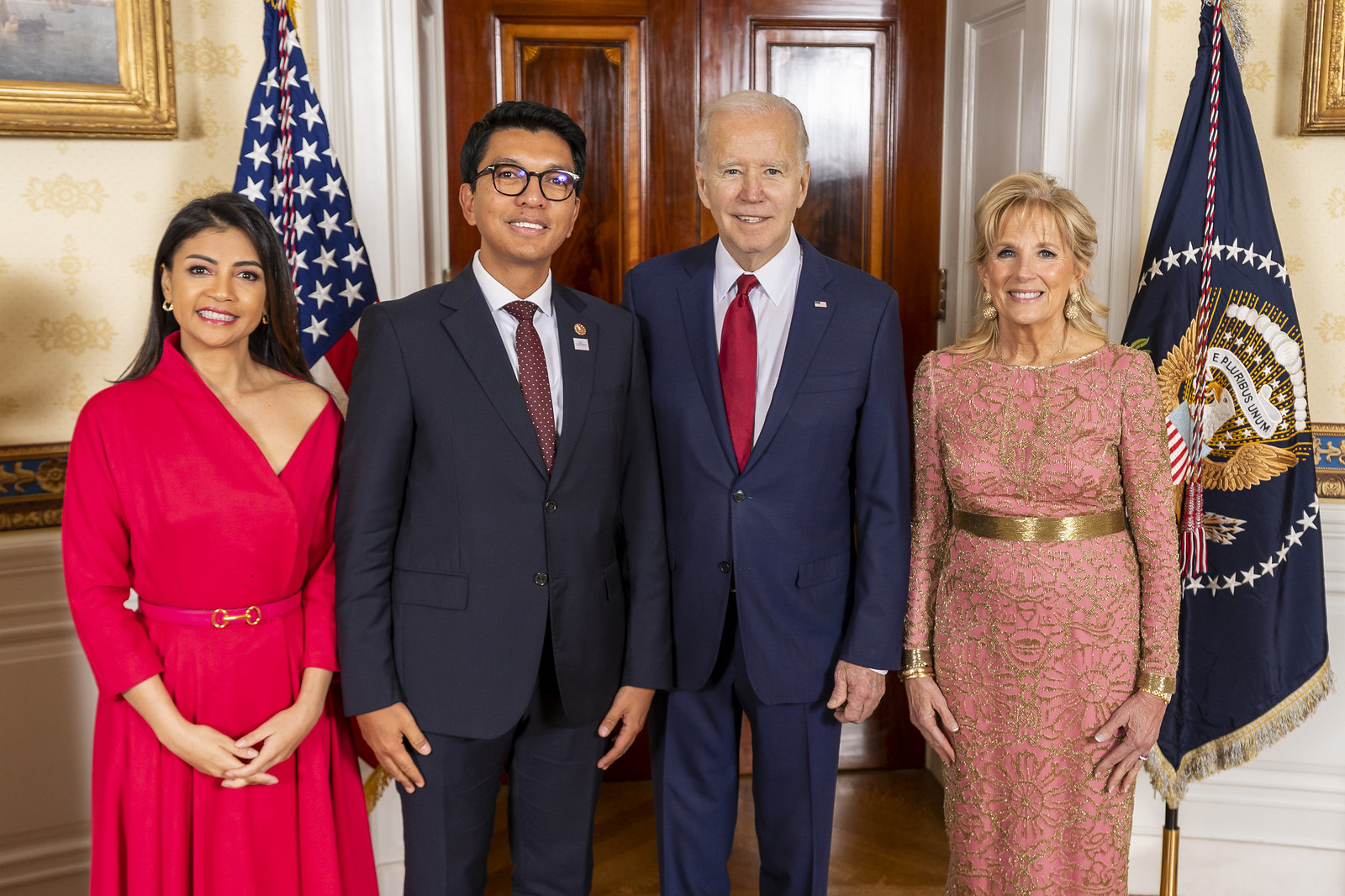
Madagascar's President Andry Rajoelina with US President Joe Biden on 14 December 2022

Madagascar–United States relations are bilateral relations between Madagascar and the United States.

== History ==
Relations between the United States and Madagascar date to the middle of the 19th century, when the United States was Madagascar's largest trade partner. The two countries concluded a commercial convention in 1867 and a treaty of peace, friendship, and commerce in 1881. At the time, Madagascar was largely controlled by the Merina Kingdom, based in the country's central highlands. In 1886, the U.S. sent its first Commercial Agent to Madagascar (John P. Finkelmeier), and in 1875 its first Consul (William W. Robinson). Both were based in the port of Tamatave (now Toamasina).

In the years between the First Franco-Hova War and the annexation of Madagascar by France, a series of U.S. Consuls in the country supported the rights of the Merina government against French colonial claims, notably by receiving exequatur from the Merina rather than the French, as the French insisted they should. This culminated in the 1895 arrest of former U.S. Consul John Louis Waller, who had been granted a large tract of land by the Merina government (who refused to make such grants to the French). Waller was taken to metropolitan France and sentenced to 20 years in prison for allegedly conspiring with Merina radicals. The incident was only resolved when U.S. President Grover Cleveland secured his release by threatening to sever diplomatic ties between the U.S. and France. Additionally, in 1882-1883 a Malagasy diplomatic delegation visited the U.S. in order to gain support against French designs on the island. They visited Washington D.C., Philadelphia, New York City, Boston, and Salem, addressing not only government officials but merchants who had substantial trade interests in Madagascar.

After France officially annexed Madagascar in 1896, French treaties with the U.S. superseded all previous treaties that the U.S. had signed with the Merina Kingdom. In 1916, the U.S. relocated its consulate from the port of Tamatave to the highland capital Tananarive (Antananarivo).

The Malagasy Republic became independent from France on June 26, 1960, and the U.S. Consulate in Madagascar was upgraded to an Embassy on the same day. The first Ambassador to Madagascar was accredited on October 5, 1960 (Frederic Pearson Bartlett). On December 5, 1960, the Malagasy Embassy to the U.S. opened in Washington D.C., and the first Malagasy Ambassador to the U.S. was accredited (Louis Rakotomalala). All U.S. treaties with France would remain in effect with Madagascar unless otherwise indicated.

In 1964 the U.S. constructed a NASA satellite tracking station in northwestern Madagascar (Majunga), which would later be moved to Antananarivo. Also in that year, Malagasy President Philibert Tsiranana visited the U.S. on a two-week tour, and received an official state welcome on the White House South Lawn.

Traditionally warm relations suffered considerably following the 1972 and 1975 coups, when Madagascar expelled the U.S. ambassador, closed the NASA tracking station, pursued closer relationships with the USSR, Cuba, and North Korea, and nationalized two U.S. oil companies. In 1980, relations at the ambassadorial level were restored.

A Peace Corps program was established on the island in 1992. Madagascar qualified for AGOA trade benefits in 2000. Madagascar became the first country with a Millennium Challenge Corporation compact when it signed an agreement worth $110 million in April 2005. The Ravalomanana government was especially positive about ties with the United States.

The fall of President Ravalomanana in 2009 and the subsequent Transition regime strained those relations. Madagascar could not benefit from much US or international aid any more, nor qualify for free trade agreements such as AGOA.

In 2013, a new president and a new national assembly were elected with the support of the international community. International aid resumed, and Madagascar was again eligible for AGOA trade benefits. However, the damage to its main export industry (textiles) was already done. However, in June 2015, a new degradation of the political climate in Antananarivo prompted the U.S. State Department to voice its concern and call for a 'national dialogue' in the country.

In 2020 the Peace Corps suspended operations in Madagascar due to the COVID-19 pandemic. In August 2022, Peace Corps volunteers returned to Madagascar.

== USAID in Madagascar ==
United States Agency for International Development (USAID) is a government agency of United States in charge of economic development and humanitarian assistance in the world. In 1984, USAID opened a field office in Madagascar. In 1990, Madagascar was designated as a priority aid recipient, and assistance increased from $15 million in 1989 to $40 million in 1993. In January 2025, USAID's activities in Madagascar were temporarily suspended for a period of 90 days, following a US presidential decree. This decision led to the interruption of several development projects underway in the country.

=== Environmental Conservation and Sustainable Development ===
USAID has been a major contributor to Madagascar's National Environmental Action Plans (PNAE) (1993–2008), funding biodiversity conservation, reforestation, and sustainable land management. However, despite these investments, deforestation remains a challenge, and the Millennium Development Goals (MDG) for 2015 were not met, due to governance issues and limited local integration.

USAID-funded conservation projects, particularly in the Ankeniheny-Zahemena Corridor (CAZ), have contributed to reducing deforestation and agricultural fires by promoting community-based forest management and sustainable land use. A 2010 study highlighted similar initiatives such as the Landscape Development Interventions and Eco-Regional Initiatives, which aimed to integrate conservation with sustainable agriculture and land-use planning. While these programs helped reduce slash-and-burn agriculture and supported environmental education initiatives to foster pro-environmental behaviors, they faced challenges in scaling up efforts, securing long-term funding, and improving governance.

Marine conservation efforts have also received USAID support, particularly through Marine Protected Areas. However, research highlights that local communities remain marginalized in decision-making, reducing the effectiveness of conservation policies.

=== Public Health Initiatives ===
USAID has supported malaria control programs, including the distribution of long-lasting insecticidal nets (LLINs) and funding for sulfadoxine-pyrimethamine distribution and healthcare training through the President's Malaria Initiative. However, studies have identified challenges such as expired LLINs being repurposed for unintended uses due to economic constraints and stock-outs of essential drugs, healthcare provider knowledge gaps, and barriers to antenatal care. These findings highlight the need for improved supply chain logistics, training programs, and disposal guidelines to enhance malaria prevention and treatment in Madagascar.

USAID-funded many programs and have worked with the Ministry of Health to improve infant and child nutrition. These initiatives have promoted exclusive breastfeeding, complementary feeding, and micronutrient supplementation, leading to measurable improvements in child health between 2000 and 2005.

=== Economic Development and Governance ===
USAID contributed to Madagascar's conservation policies, particularly in the expansion of protected areas under the Durban Vision (2003). The book discusses how international donors and conservation organizations influenced these decisions, which sometimes resulted in limited consultation with local communities. It also highlights that USAID's conservation funding was primarily guided by biodiversity objectives.

== Economic relations ==
In 2024, Madagascar exported $733 million in goods to the United States, largely under the African Growth and Opportunity Act (AGOA), which provides duty-free access for many African products. However, in April 2025, Madagascar faced the potential loss of around 60,000 textile jobs following the imposition of a 47% U.S. tariff under President Donald Trump's administration. The tariff disproportionately affected low-income countries like Madagascar, which import limited volumes of U.S. goods. The textile sector, employing approximately 180,000 people and contributing about 20% of Madagascar's GDP, has been particularly impacted. In response, Malagasy officials initiated dialogue with U.S. authorities and sought coordination with other affected African nations to address the issue.

== Resident diplomatic missions ==
- Madagascar has an embassy in Washington, D.C.
- United States has an embassy in Antananarivo.
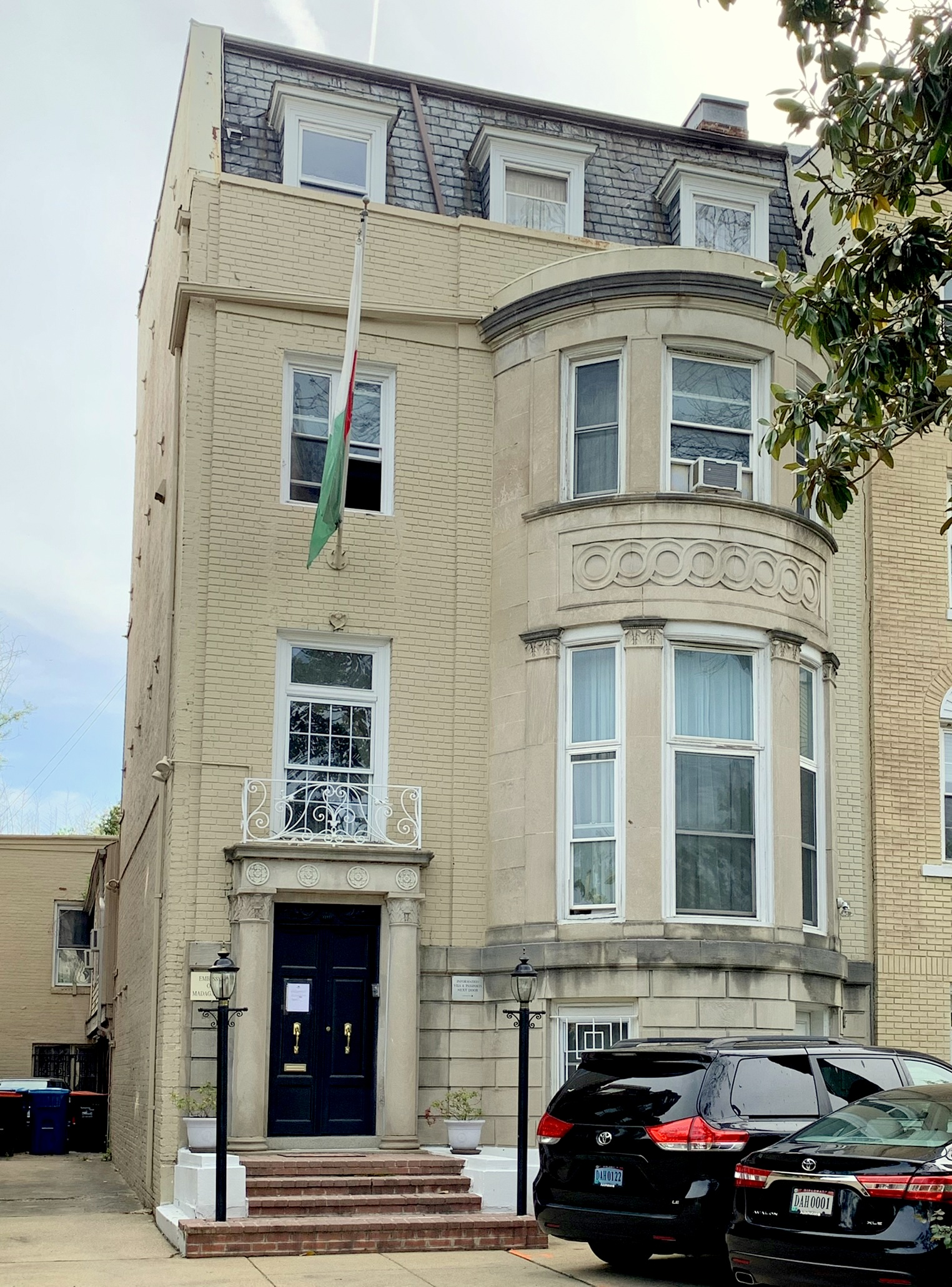
Embassy of Madagascar in Washington, D.C.

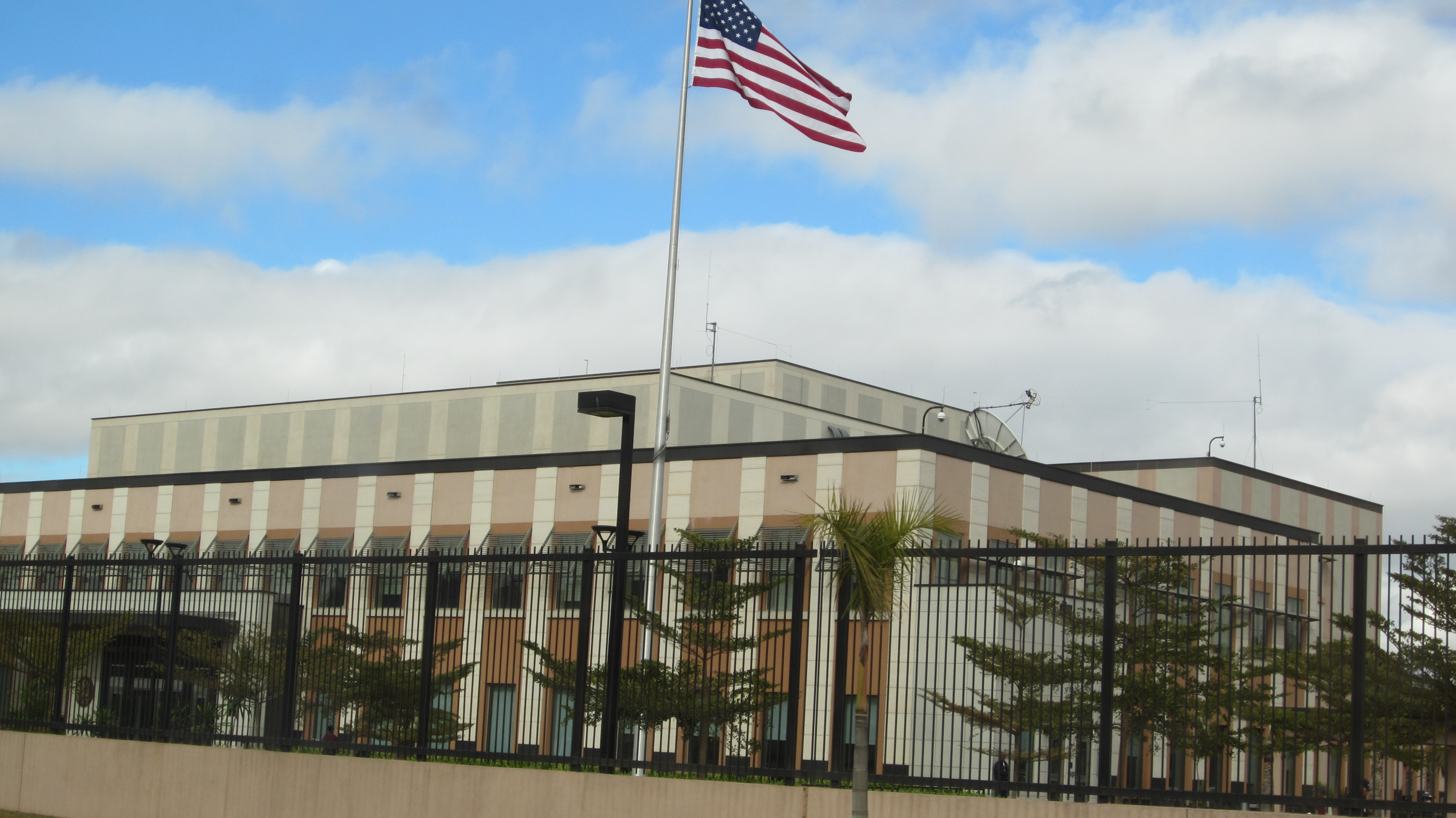
Embassy of the United States in Antananarivo

== See also ==
- Foreign relations of Madagascar
- Foreign relations of the United States
