= List of diplomatic missions in Madagascar =

This is a list of all the diplomatic missions in Madagascar. There are currently 22 embassies and one consulate general in Antananarivo.

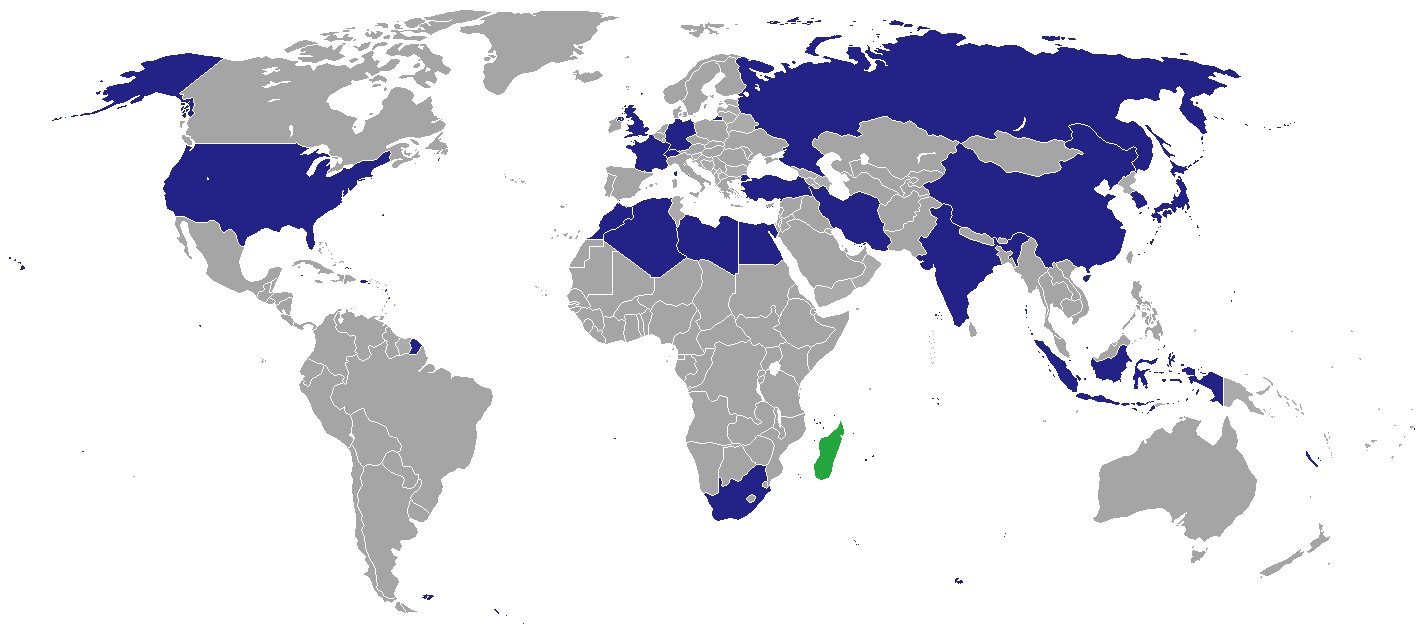
Diplomatic missions in Madagascar Madagascar Countries with an embassy in Madagascar Countries with consulate-general in Madagascar

== Diplomatic missions in Antananarivo ==
=== Embassies ===
1. Algeria
2. China
3. Comoros
4. Egypt
5. France
6. Germany
7. Holy See
8. India
9. Indonesia
10. Iran
11. Japan
12. Libya
13. Mauritius
14. Morocco
15. Russia
16. South Africa
17. South Korea
18. Sovereign Military Order of Malta
19. Switzerland
20. Turkey
21. United Kingdom
22. United States

=== Other missions or delegations ===
- European Union (Delegation)

=== Gallery ===
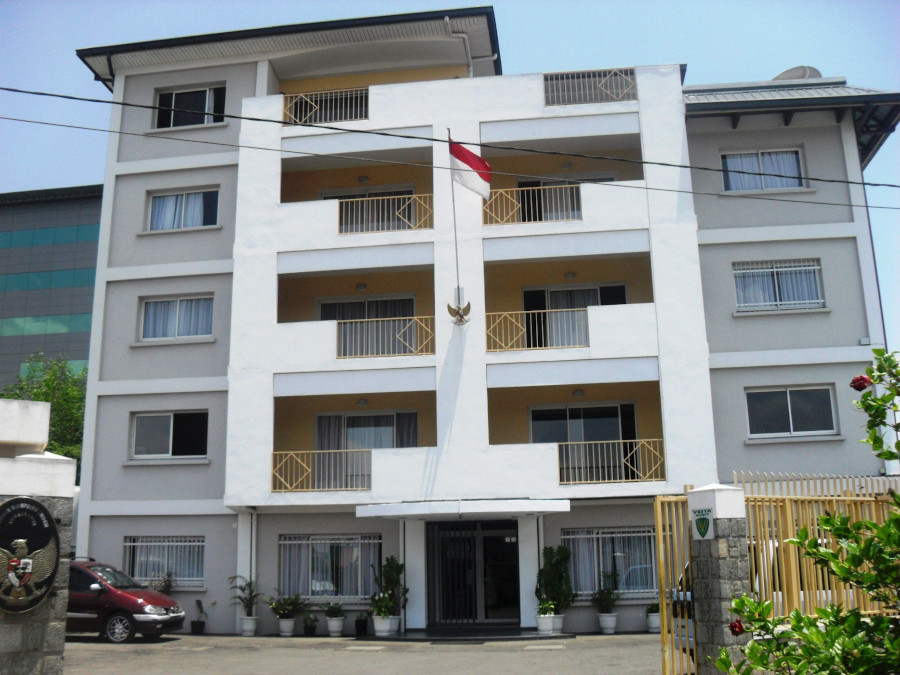
Embassy of Indonesia

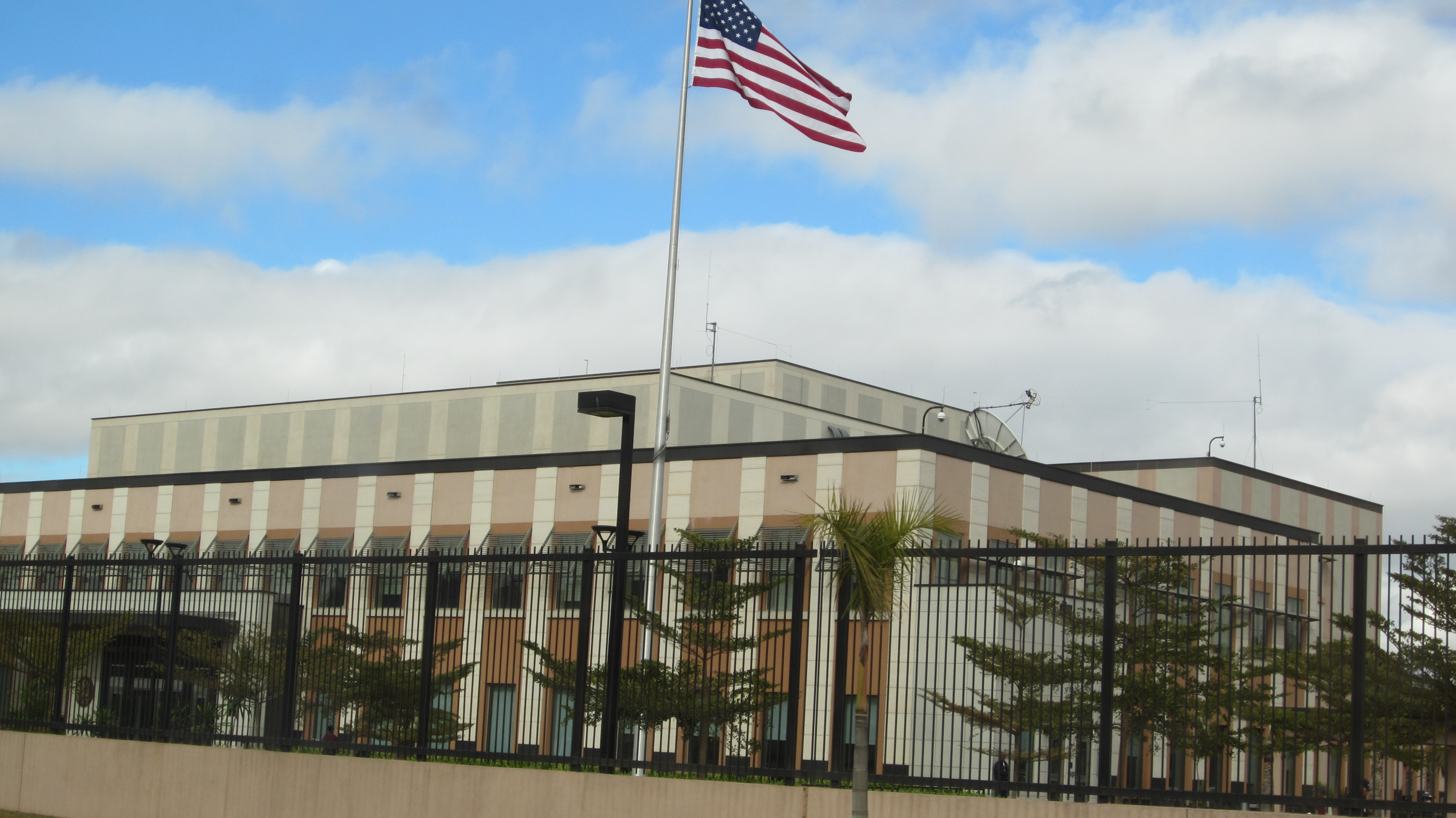
Embassy of the United States

== Consular missions ==
=== Antsiranana ===
- France (Consular office)

=== Mahajanga ===
- Comoros Consulate
- France (Consular office)

=== Toamasina ===
- France (Consular office)

== Non-resident embassies ==
=== Resident in Maputo, Mozambique ===
- Botswana
- Brazil
- Equatorial Guinea
- Finland
- Ireland
- Kenya
- Malawi
- Nigeria
- Sweden
- Tanzania
- Vietnam

=== Resident in Nairobi, Kenya ===
- Argentina
- Belgium
- Cuba
- Greece
- Poland

=== Resident in Pretoria, South Africa ===
- Angola
- Austria
- Burkina Faso
- Cameroon
- Canada
- Colombia
- Croatia
- Cyprus
- Czechia
- Hungary
- Israel
- Italy
- Lesotho
- Malaysia
- Mali
- Mexico
- Mozambique
- Namibia
- Norway
- Oman
- Philippines
- Portugal
- Romania
- Rwanda
- Senegal
- Serbia
- Seychelles
- Slovakia
- Spain
- Thailand
- Trinidad & Tobago
- Ukraine
- Zimbabwe

=== Resident in other cities ===
- Australia (Port Louis)
- Bangladesh (Port Louis)
- Cameroon (Addis Ababa)
- Denmark (Kampala)
- Ghana (Luanda)
- Maldives (New Delhi)
- Netherlands (Dar es Salaam)
- Saudi Arabia (Dar es Salaam)

== Closed missions ==
| Host city | Sending country | Mission | Year closed | Ref. |
|---|---|---|---|---|
| Antananarivo | Cuba | Embassy (Note: Resident in Nairobi, Kenya) | Unknown | |
| Antananarivo | Israel | Embassy (Note: Resident in Pretoria, South Africa) | 1973 | |
| Antananarivo | Italy | Embassy | Unknown | |
| Antananarivo | North Korea | Embassy | 2002 | |
| Antananarivo | Norway | Embassy Office | 2023 | |
| Antananarivo | Philippines | Embassy | Unknown | |
| Antananarivo | Sahrawi Republic | Embassy | 2005 | |
| Antananarivo | Senegal | Embassy | 2012 | |
| Antananarivo | Thailand | Consulate General | 2024 | |
| Antananarivo | Vietnam | Embassy (Note: Resident in Maputo, Mozambique) | 1990 | |
| Fianarantsoa | France | Consulate-General | 1991 | |
| Toamasina | China | Consulate-General | 2014 | |

== See also ==
- Foreign relations of Madagascar
- List of diplomatic missions of Madagascar
- Apostolic Nunciature to Madagascar
