= France–Madagascar relations =

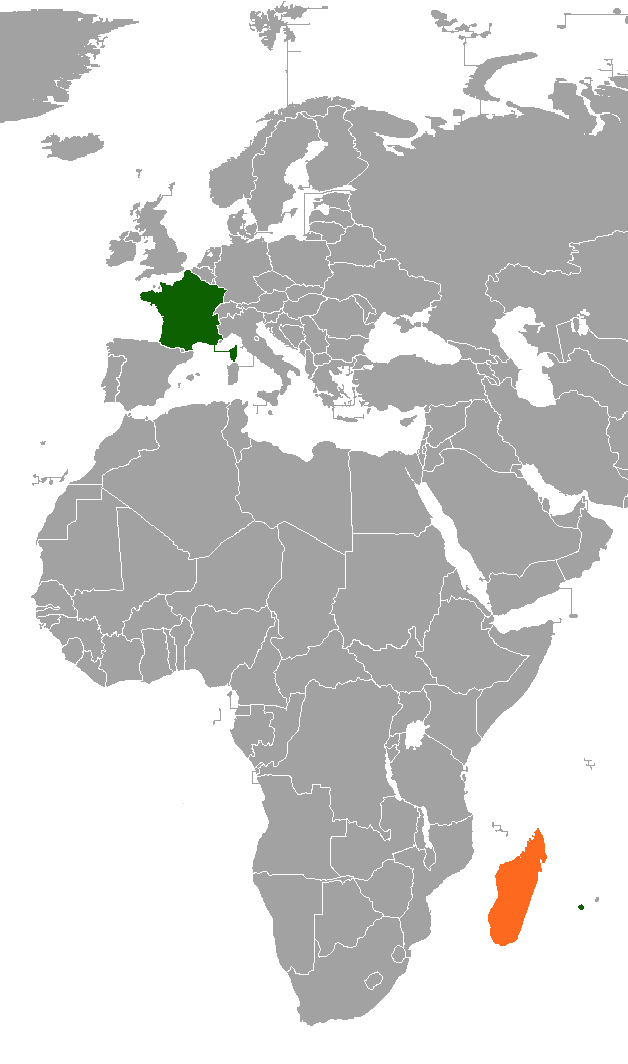
- France: Madagascar

France–Madagascar relations are the diplomatic relations between the French Republic and the Republic of Madagascar. France controlled Madagascar beginning in 1895 until the islands nation's independence in 1960. Both nations are today members of the Francophonie and the United Nations.

== History ==
=== French colonization ===
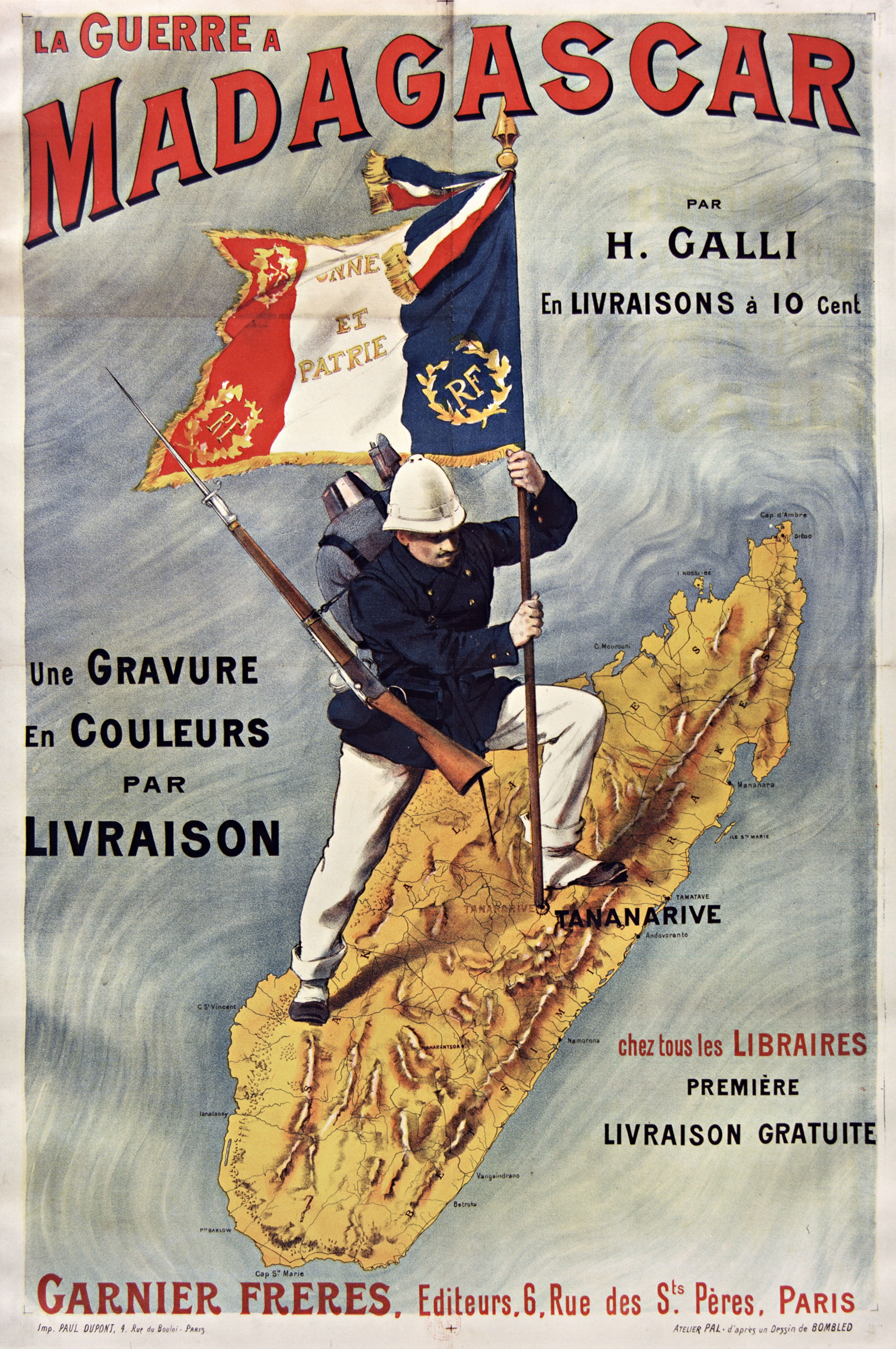
Poster depicting the 1895 French war in Madagascar

In 1643, the French East India Company came to Madagascar and built a fort in the southern town of Fort Dauphin (today known as Tôlanaro). For the next 30 years, the French maintained a fort there until 1674. Since then, many French pirates operated on the island and maintained homes on nearby Île Sainte-Marie.

In 1883, the French government sent a military expedition to Madagascar which soon escalated into an armed conflict between the Malagasy and the French and became known as the First Franco-Hova War (1883-1885). After the war, Madagascar became a French Protectorate. Soon after the end of the war, a second conflict began between the royal government of Queen Ranavalona III of Madagascar and the French military escalating into the Second Franco-Hova War (1894-1895). In 1895, Queen Ranavalona surrendered and in 1896 Madagascar was formerly annexed by France.

During World War II Madagascar fell under control of Vichy France. From May through November 1942, the Battle of Madagascar took place on the northern tip of the island nation near the town of Antsiranana (also known as Diego-Suarez). Allied forces feared that the Japanese government would take Madagascar and use it as a base to control the Indian Ocean. In May 1942, British and allied force invaded Madagascar and defeated the French forces loyal to Vichy in November 1942.

=== Independence ===
Soon after the war, Madagascar began to demand independence from France. In March 1947, the Malagasy Uprising began and lasted until December 1948, when French forces defeated the Malagasy rebels. Madagascar moved towards greater autonomy in several stages between 1958 and 1960. France offered three options in the constitutional referendum of September 1958: to be an overseas territory; a department; or "a state [...] that will deal with the French republic on a basis of equality... within the larger community". The Malagasy's chose the latter option. However throughout the regime of Tsiranana (1959–72) the relationship to France remained strong, with French representation in the provincial assemblies and a French role in military and intelligence affairs, while the currency was linked to the French franc.

=== Post Independence ===
Since obtaining independence, relations between both nations remain strong, both politically and culturally. Leaders of both nations have paid state visits to the each other's nations, respectively, and Madagascar is huge recipient of French government aid and development assistance. Madagascar is home to several thousand French expatriates and France is also home to a large Malagasy diaspora.

A dispute over the Scattered Islands in the Indian Ocean, some of which were separated from the colony of Madagascar prior to independence, has overshadowed relations. Two United Nations resolutions have called for France to cede the islands, and their surrounding waters, to Madagascar. The islands were discussed during the visit of Emmanuel Macron in 2025, the first visit of a French President since 2005. After Cyclone Gezani, France donated humanitarian aid to counter Russian influence in Madagascar and Michael Randrianirina made a state visit to Paris.

== Trade ==
In 2018, bilateral trade between both nations amounted to €999 million. Madagascar's main export products to France include: textiles, agricultural and fish products whereas France's main exports to Madagascar include: mechanical and electrical machinery and processed food and drinks. Several French multinational companies operate in Madagascar particularly in the banking, telephone and energy industries. French companies such as Crédit Agricole, Société Générale, Orange and Total all have offices and operate in Madagascar.

== Resident diplomatic missions ==
- France has an embassy in Antananarivo.
- Madagascar has an embassy in Paris and consulates-general in Marseille and Saint-Denis.

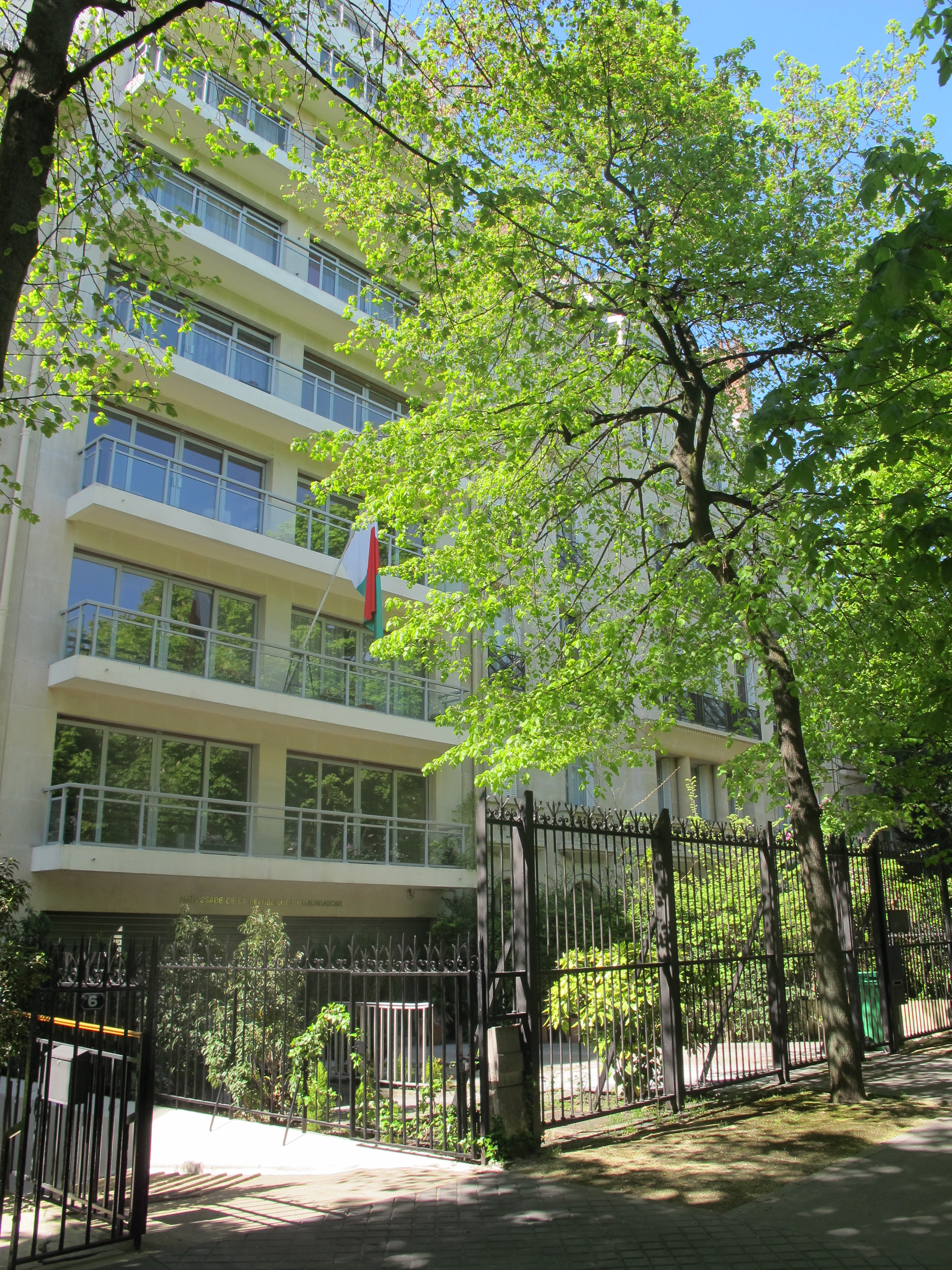
Embassy of Madagascar in Paris

== See also ==
- Françafrique
- French people in Madagascar
- Malagasy people in France
