= Germany–Madagascar relations =

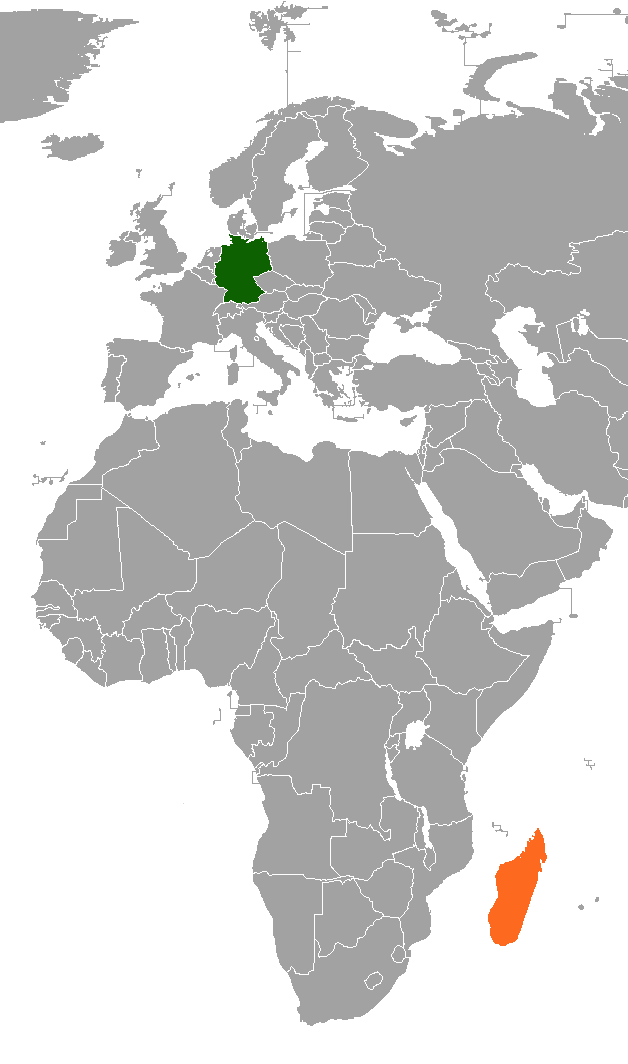

- Germany: Madagascar

Germany–Madagascar relations are "traditionally friendly", according to the German Foreign Office. Diplomatic contacts have been maintained between the two countries since the 19th century. In the 21st century, relations between the two countries are predominantly characterized by development cooperation.

== History ==
A shipping connection between Zanzibar and Nosy Be was established in 1857 by the entrepreneur William O'Swald from Hamburg. The world traveler Ida Pfeiffer visited Madagascar in 1857 and four years later published the two-volume travelogue Reise nach Madagaskar, one of the first German-language testimonies about Madagascar. In 1876, a German foreign trade post was opened in the port city of Tamatave, which was converted into a consulate a few years later. In 1883, the Kingdom of Madagascar and the German Empire signed a treaty of friendship and intensified bilateral trade. However, the German Empire did not develop colonial ambitions in Madagascar and the Kingdom of Madagascar became a colony of France. German-Madagascan trade exchanges were interrupted by the start of World War I.

As early as the end of the 19th century, anti-Semites in the German Empire brought Madagascar into discussion as a possible new "home" for European Jews. In 1902, the Zionist Theodor Herzl wrote his novel Altneuland about Madagascar as a possible destination for European Jews. After Adolf Hitler came to power in Germany, concrete plans for the deportation of Europe's Jews to Madagascar were drawn up by the Nazi state in the form of the Madagascar Plan. However, the French Vichy government resisted the cession of Madagascar and British military superiority on the high seas doomed the Madagascar Plan to failure. In 1942, therefore, it was abandoned and the Nazi leadership intensified its plans for the extermination of the Jews in Europe.

After the end of World War II and the decolonization of Africa, Madagascar, which had become independent of France, established diplomatic relations with the Federal Republic of Germany in 1960. A year later, a Malagasy embassy was opened in Bonn. After the abandonment of the Hallstein Doctrine under Chancellor Willy Brandt, Madagascar also established diplomatic relations with the German Democratic Republic in 1973. In 1983, to mark the centenary of the German-Madagascan Friendship Treaty, the German-Madagascan Society was founded. Germany became an important donor country for Madagascar in the area of development aid after the country's independence. However, after the military-backed change of government in Madagascar in 2009, the bilateral development partnership was suspended and only resumed in 2014.

== Economic relations ==
The joint trade volume in 2021 was 226 million euros, placing Madagascar in 114th place in the ranking of Germany's trading partners. Germany exports to Madagascar mainly industrial, pharmaceutical and chemical products, and in return imports clothing, raw materials and foodstuffs from Madagascar. Germany is among the most important export markets for Madagascar.

== Development cooperation ==
Germany is the third-largest donor of development aid to Madagascar and the largest donor in environmental protection. An important focus of development cooperation is on the sustainable use of resources, environmental protection and the preservation of Madagascar's unique biodiversity. Germany is helping to establish protected areas and manage national parks. Another priority of cooperation is the promotion of employment through support for the private sector and the fight against poverty, including through support for microcredits. In 2018, German aid amounted to nearly 30 million euros. On the private side, non-governmental organizations such as the German Red Cross, German Agro Action, and CARE Germany are active in Madagascar.

== Cultural relations ==
The Cercle Germano-Malagasy became a branch of the Goethe-Institut in 1976 and is an integral part of Antananarivo's cultural landscape. Nearly 30,000 students in schools in Madagascar learn German as a foreign language, and there is a German studies Institute at the University of Antananarivo.

== Diplomatic missions ==
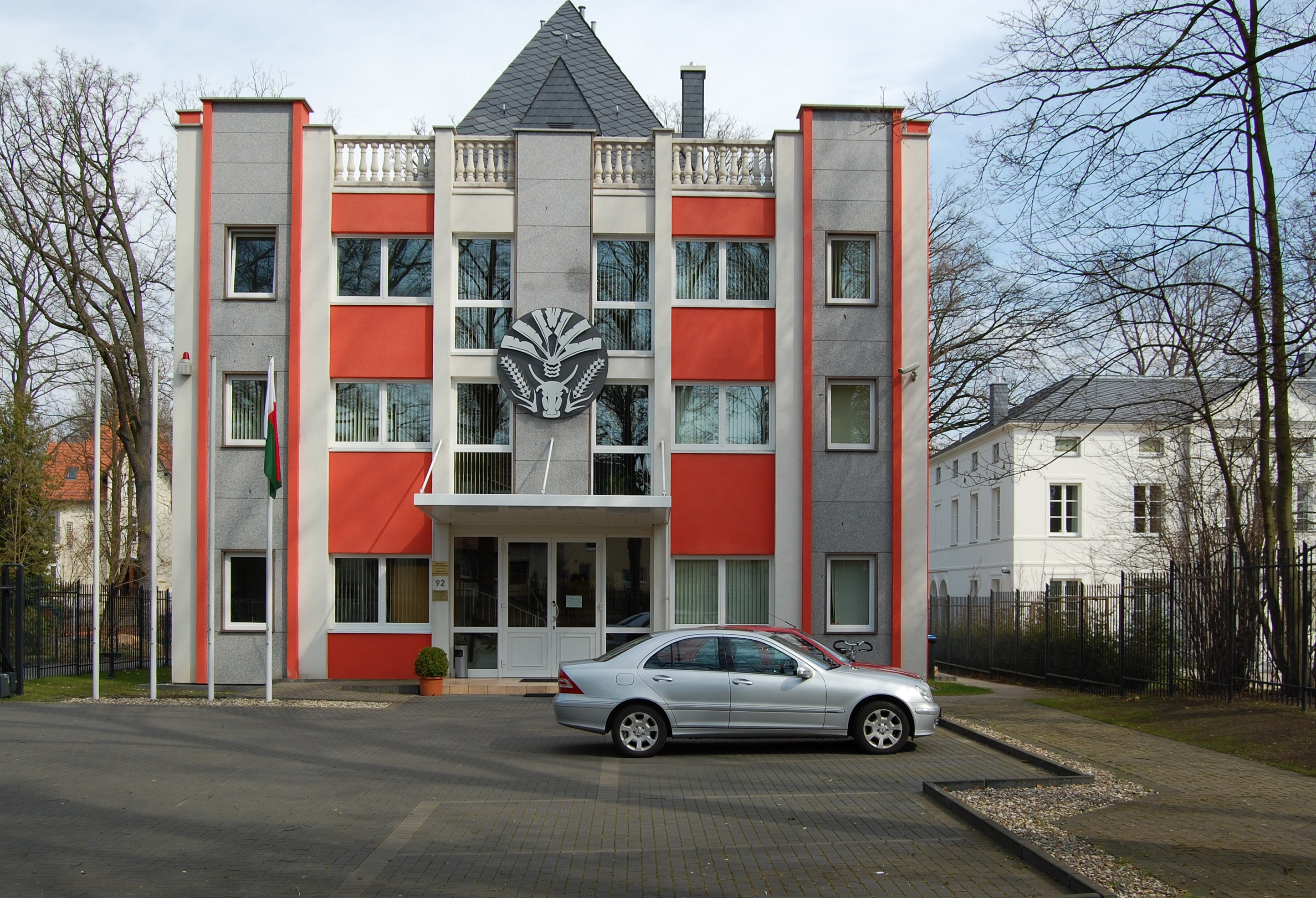
Embassy of Madagascar, Berlin

- Germany has an embassy in Antananarivo.
- Madagascar has an embassy in Berlin.

== See also ==
- Foreign relations of Germany
- Foreign relations of Madagascar
