= Madagascar–Turkey relations =

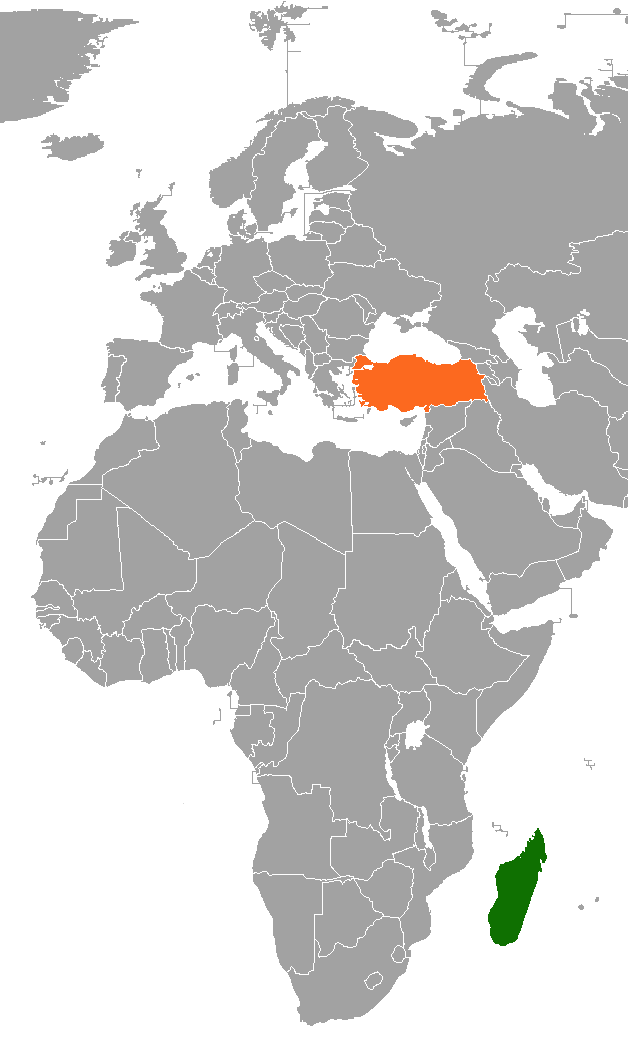
- Madagascar: Turkey

Madagascar–Turkey relations are the foreign relations between Madagascar and Turkey. Turkey has an embassy in Antananarivo since April 21, 2010. Madagascar is accredited to Turkey from its embassy in Rome, Italy. Madagascar also has an honorary consulate in Istanbul.

== Diplomatic relations ==
Madagascar–Turkey relations were generally warm, except for the 1970s.

In 1972, Madagascar’s foreign policy shifted dramatically after the downfall of the Tsiranana regime. President Ratsiraka, revoking what he called the slavery agreements with the French, nationalized all French financial and insurance firms without compensation in June 1975. He further strengthened ties with the Soviet Union (in 1972) and North Korea, which contributed to a dramatic cooling of Malagasy–Turkey relations.

The relations worsened when the Ratsiraka regime suspended diplomatic relations with Israel, then Turkey’s closest ally in the Middle East and hosted an international conference on the North Korean ideology of Juche in Antananarivo in 1976.

Relations improved in the 1980s when Madagascar aligned more closely with the West, especially after Madagascar dismantled the Soviet stations along Madagascar’s west coast along the Mozambique Channel.

== Economic relations ==
- Trade volume between the two countries was 76.5 million USD in 2019 (Turkish exports/imports: 71.3/5.2 million USD).

== See also ==
- Foreign relations of Madagascar
- Foreign relations of Turkey
