= Madagascar–United Kingdom relations =

- Madagascar: United Kingdom

Diplomatic mission
- Embassy of Madagascar, London: Embassy of the United Kingdom, Antananarivo

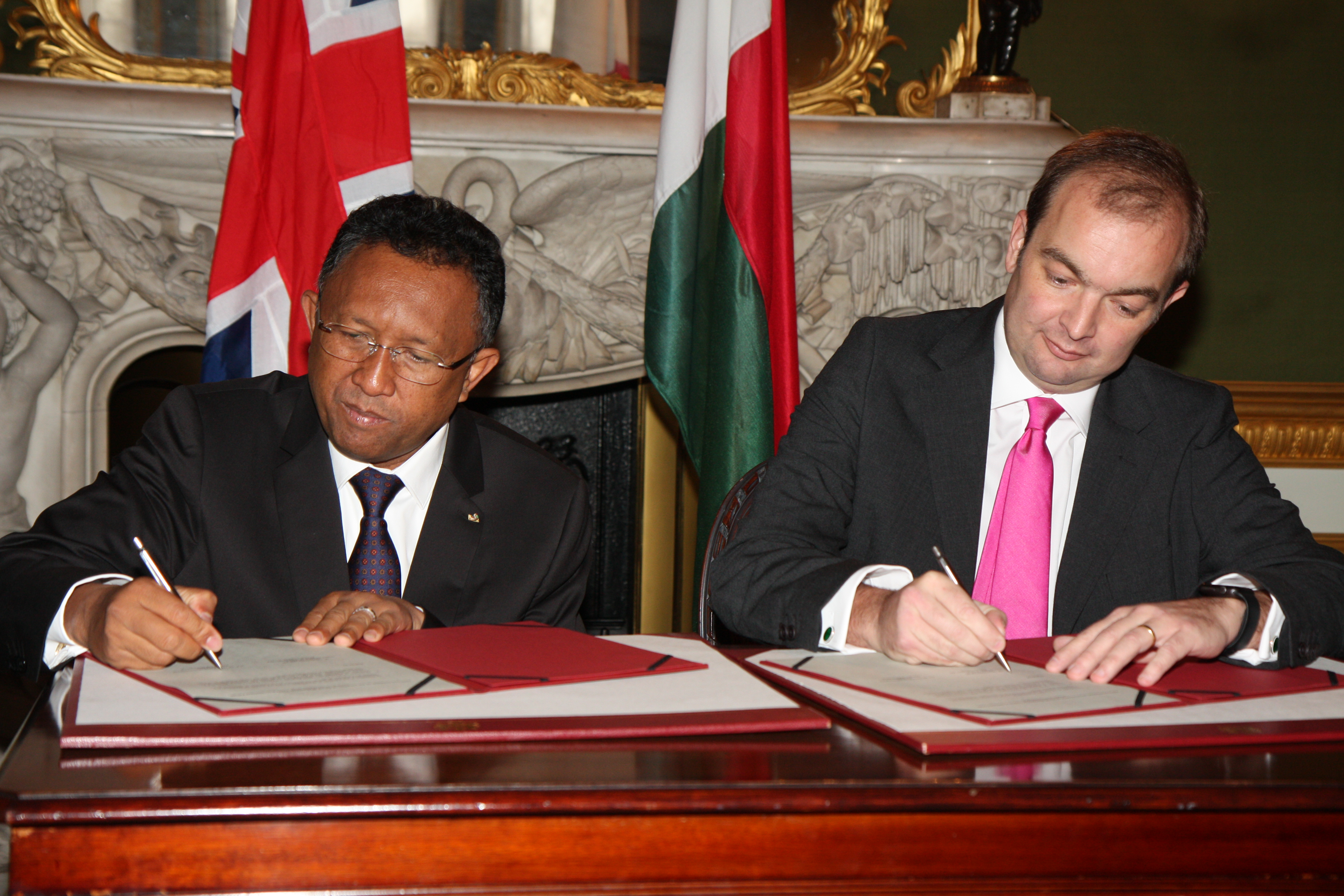
Malagasy President Hery Rajaonarimampianina with British Foreign Office Minister James Duddridge in London, November 2015.

Madagascar and the United Kingdom established diplomatic relations on 27 June 1960.

Both countries share common membership of the International Criminal Court, the United Nations, and the World Trade Organization, as well as the Eastern and Southern Africa–UK Economic Partnership Agreement. Bilaterally the two countries have a Development Partnership.

== History ==
The UK administered Madagascar from 1942 to 1943, when Madagascar was transferred to France.

== Economic relations ==
From 4 August 2014 until 30 December 2020, trade between Cameroon and the UK was governed by the Eastern and Southern Africa–European Community Economic Partnership Agreement, while the United Kingdom was a member of the European Union.

Following the withdrawal of the United Kingdom from the European Union, the United Kingdom and Mauritius, the Seychelles, and Zimbabwe signed the Eastern and Southern Africa–United Kingdom Economic Partnership Agreement on 31 January 2019. The Eastern and Southern Africa–United Kingdom Economic Partnership Agreement is a continuity trade agreement, based on the EU free trade agreement, which entered into force on 1 January 2021. Madagascar signed the economic partnership agreement on 4 November 2021 and joined the agreement on 1 August 2024. Trade value between COMESA states and the United Kingdom was worth £1,922 million in 2022.

== Diplomatic missions ==
- Madagascar maintains an embassy in London.
- The United Kingdom is accredited to Madagascar through its embassy in Antananarivo.

== See also ==
- Economic Partnership Agreements
- Foreign relations of Madagascar
- Foreign relations of the United Kingdom
