= Indonesia–Madagascar relations =

- Indonesia: Madagascar

Indonesia–Madagascar relations spans for over a millennium since the ancestors of the people of Madagascar sailed across the Indian Ocean from the Nusantara Archipelago during the 8th or 9th century AD. Indonesia has an embassy in Antananarivo, while Madagascar accredits its embassy in Tokyo to Indonesia. It was announced in December 2017 that Madagascar would be opening an embassy in Jakarta in 2018. However, the embassy was never opened. In 2026, Malagasy Foreign Minister Alice N'Diaye reiterated this intention. Both countries are members of the Non-Aligned Movement.

The countries share a strong ethnolinguistic link in their Austronesian languages and Austronesian populations.

== History ==
The historical links between the Nusantara Archipelago and Madagascar took place during the Srivijaya era. It is suggested that the empire contributes to the population of Madagascar 6,600 kilometres (4,100 mi) to the southwest. Austronesian peoples' migration to Madagascar was estimated to have happened around 830 AD. According to an extensive new mitochondrial DNA study, native Malagasy people today can likely trace their genetic heritage back to 30 different mothers from Indonesia. Malagasy contains loan words from Sanskrit, all with local linguistic modifications via Javanese or Malay, hint that Madagascar may have been colonized by settlers from the Srivijaya empire. At that time the Srivijayan maritime empire was expanding their maritime trade network.

Linguistic links are evident in similar words shared between Malagasy language and Indonesian. Examples include "hand": tananə (Malagasy), tangan (Malay); skin:ˈhoditra (Malagasy), kulit (Malay); white: ˈfotsy (Malagasy), putih (Malay); island: nosy (Malagasy), nusa (Javanese).

The Malagasy people have genetic links to various Maritime Southeast Asian ethnic groups, particularly from southern Borneo. Parts of the Malagasy language are sourced from the Ma'anyan language with loan words from Sanskrit, showing all the local linguistic modifications via Javanese and Malay languages. As the Ma'anyan and Dayak people were not traditionally sailors but dry-rice cultivators, while some Malagasy are wet rice farmers, it is likely that they were carried aboard the Javanese and Malay trading fleets as labor or slaves.

Javanese trading and slaving activities in Africa had a strong influence on boat-building in Madagascar and the East African coast, where African boats used outriggers and oculi (eye ornaments). The Malagasy title andriana probably originated from the ancient Java-Indonesian nobility title Rahadyan (Ra-hady-an), hady meaning "Lord" or "Master."

A Portuguese account described how Javanese communicated with Madagascar in 1645:

The Javanese are all men very experienced in the art of navigation, to the point that they claim to be the most ancient of all, although many others give this honor to the Chinese, and affirm that this art was handed on from them to the Javanese. But it is certain that they formerly navigated to the Cape of Good Hope and were in communication with the east coast of the island of São Lourenço [i.e. San Laurenzo, Madagascar], where there are many brown and Javanese-like natives who say they are descended from them. — Diogo do Couto, Decada Quarta da Asia

Diplomatic relations between Indonesia and Madagascar were officially established on 13 December 1974 through a Memorandum of Understanding signed by foreign ministers Adam Malik and Didier Ratsiraka. However, it was not until 2009 that Indonesia opened their embassy in Antananarivo, while the Malagasy embassy in Tokyo is accredited to Indonesia.

In 2003, a Borobudur ship expedition visited Madagascar, sailing from Indonesia on its way to Accra, Ghana (see Samudra Raksa). The ship was reconstructed from a Borobudur illustration, and the reenactment voyage demonstrated the practicality of ancient trading links between Indonesia and East Africa (including Madagascar). The treacherous Cinnamon shipping route took vessels from Indonesian waters across the Indian Ocean past the Seychelles, Madagascar, and South Africa to Ghana. It also demonstrated how ancient Indonesian sailors and settlers reached Madagascar.

== High level visits ==
In November 2008, Malagasy President Marc Ravalomanana visited Indonesia and met President Susilo Bambang Yudhoyono. This is his second visit to Indonesia, as Ravalomanana previously visited the country in 2005 during the Asian-African Conference anniversary in Bandung.

In June 2026, Malagasy Foreign Minister Alice N’Diaye visited Indonesia and met her counterpart Sugiono. A Memorandum of Understanding to form the Joint Commission for Bilateral Cooperation (JCBC) was signed by the two foreign ministers. Sugiono described Madagascar as Indonesia’s strategic link to Africa's mineral resources, advocating for enhanced economic collaboration and reduced travel restrictions.

== See also ==
- Foreign relations of Indonesia
- Foreign relations of Madagascar
