= List of diplomatic missions of Madagascar =

This is a list of diplomatic missions of Madagascar, excluding honorary consulates. Madagascar is beginning to expand its diplomatic presence abroad.

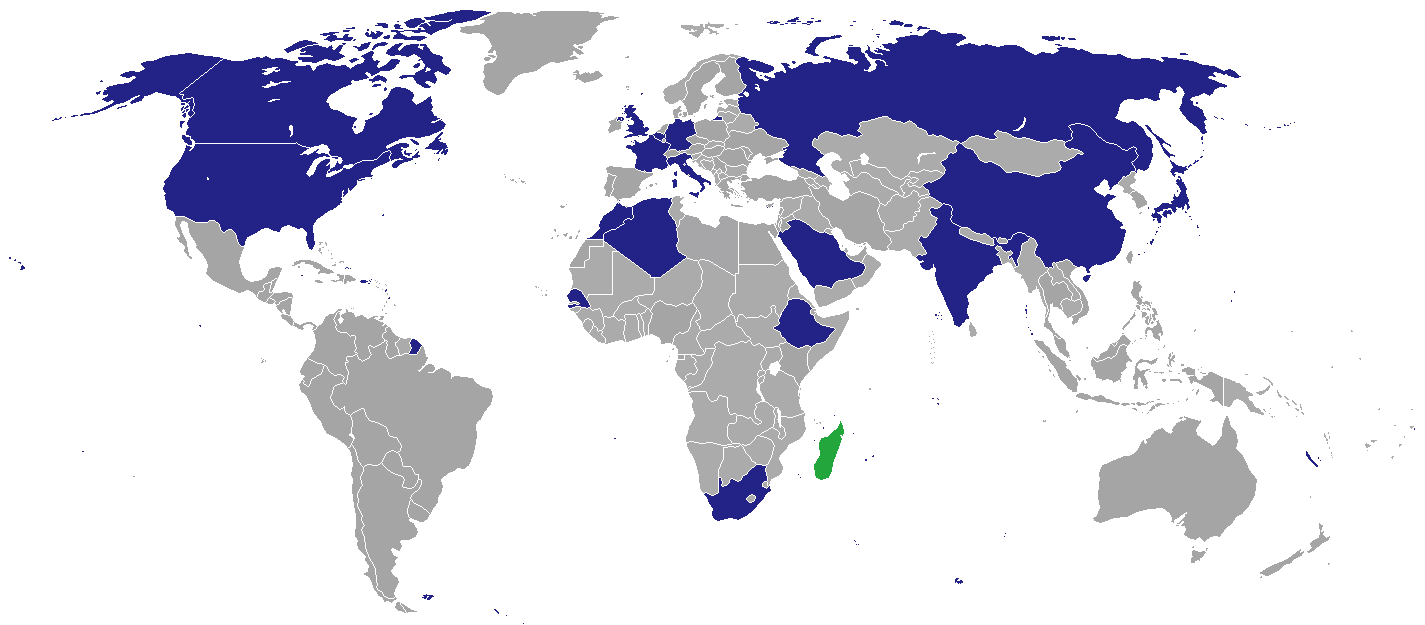
Map of countries with Malagasy embassies Madagascar Embassy

== Current missions ==
=== Africa ===
Host country	Host city	Mission	Concurrent accreditation	Ref.
Algeria	Algiers	Embassy	Countries: Libya; Mauritania; Tunisia	
Ethiopia	Addis Ababa	Embassy	Countries: Cameroon; Central African Republic; Chad; Congo-Brazzaville; Djibouti; Egypt; Eritrea; Gabon; Iran; Kenya; Somalia; Sudan; South Sudan; Uganda	
Mauritius	Port Louis	Embassy	Countries: Australia; Bangladesh; New Zealand; Pakistan; Seychelles; Solomon Islands; Timor-Leste; International Organizations: Indian Ocean Commission; Indian Ocean Rim Association	
Morocco	Rabat	Embassy	Countries: Burkina Faso; Cape Verde; Mali; Nigeria	
Senegal	Dakar	Embassy	Countries: Benin; Central African Republic; Equatorial Guinea; Gambia; Ghana; Guinea; Guinea-Bissau; Ivory Coast; Liberia; Niger; São Tomé and Príncipe; Sierra Leone; Togo	
South Africa	Pretoria	Embassy	Countries: Angola; Botswana; Burundi; Congo-Kinshasa; Eswatini; Lesotho; Malawi; Mozambique; Namibia; Rwanda; Tanzania; Zambia; Zimbabwe	
South Africa	Cape Town	Consulate-General	Countries: Angola; Botswana; Burundi; Congo-Kinshasa; Eswatini; Lesotho; Malawi; Mozambique; Namibia; Rwanda; Tanzania; Zambia; Zimbabwe	

=== Americas ===
Host country	Host city	Mission	Concurrent accreditation	Ref.
Canada	Ottawa	Embassy	Countries: Antigua and Barbuda; Bahamas; Barbados; Belize; Cuba; Dominican Republic; Haiti; Jamaica; Saint Lucia; Saint Kitts and Nevis; Saint Vincent and the Grenadines; Trinidad and Tobago	
United States	Washington, D.C.	Embassy	Countries: Argentina; Bolivia; Brazil; Chile; Colombia; Ecuador; Guyana; Mexico; Paraguay; Peru; Suriname; Uruguay; Venezuela	

=== Asia ===
Host country	Host city	Mission	Concurrent accreditation	Ref.
China	Beijing	Embassy	Countries: Cambodia; Laos; Mongolia; Myanmar; Thailand; Vietnam	
India	New Delhi	Embassy	Countries: Afghanistan; Bhutan; Maldives; Nepal; Sri Lanka	
Japan	Tokyo	Embassy	Countries: Brunei; Indonesia; Malaysia; Philippines; Papua New Guinea; Singapore; South Korea	
Saudi Arabia	Riyadh	Embassy	Countries: Bahrain; Iraq; Jordan; Kuwait; Lebanon; Oman; Qatar; Syria; United Arab Emirates; Yemen	

=== Europe ===
Host country	Host city	Mission	Concurrent accreditation	Ref.
Belgium	Brussels	Embassy	Countries: Luxembourg; Netherlands; International Organizations: European Union; Organisation for the Prohibition of Chemical Weapons	
France	Paris	Embassy	Countries: Holy See; Israel; Kosovo; Monaco; Portugal; Spain	
France	Marseille	Consulate-General	Countries: Holy See; Israel; Kosovo; Monaco; Portugal; Spain	
France	Saint-Denis, Réunion	Consulate-General	Countries: Holy See; Israel; Kosovo; Monaco; Portugal; Spain	
Germany	Berlin	Embassy	Countries: Austria; Czechia; Denmark; Estonia; Hungary; Iceland; Lithuania; Poland; Slovakia	
Italy	Rome	Embassy	Countries: Albania; Armenia; Bosnia and Herzegovina; Bulgaria; Croatia; Cyprus; Georgia; Greece; Moldova; Montenegro; North Macedonia; Romania; San Marino; Slovenia; Turkey; International Organizations: Food and Agriculture Organization; International Fund for Agricultural Development; World Food Programme	
Russia	Moscow	Embassy	Countries: Azerbaijan; Belarus; Kazakhstan; Kyrgyzstan; Latvia; Serbia; Tajikistan; Turkmenistan; Ukraine; Uzbekistan	
United Kingdom	London	Embassy	Countries: Finland; Ireland; Norway; Sweden; International Organizations: International Coffee Organization; International Maritime Organization	

=== Multilateral organizations ===
Organization	Host city	Host country	Mission	Concurrent accreditation	Ref.
United Nations	New York City	United States	Permanent Mission		
United Nations	Geneva	Switzerland	Permanent Mission	Countries: Switzerland	
UNESCO	Paris	France	Permanent Mission		

== Gallery ==
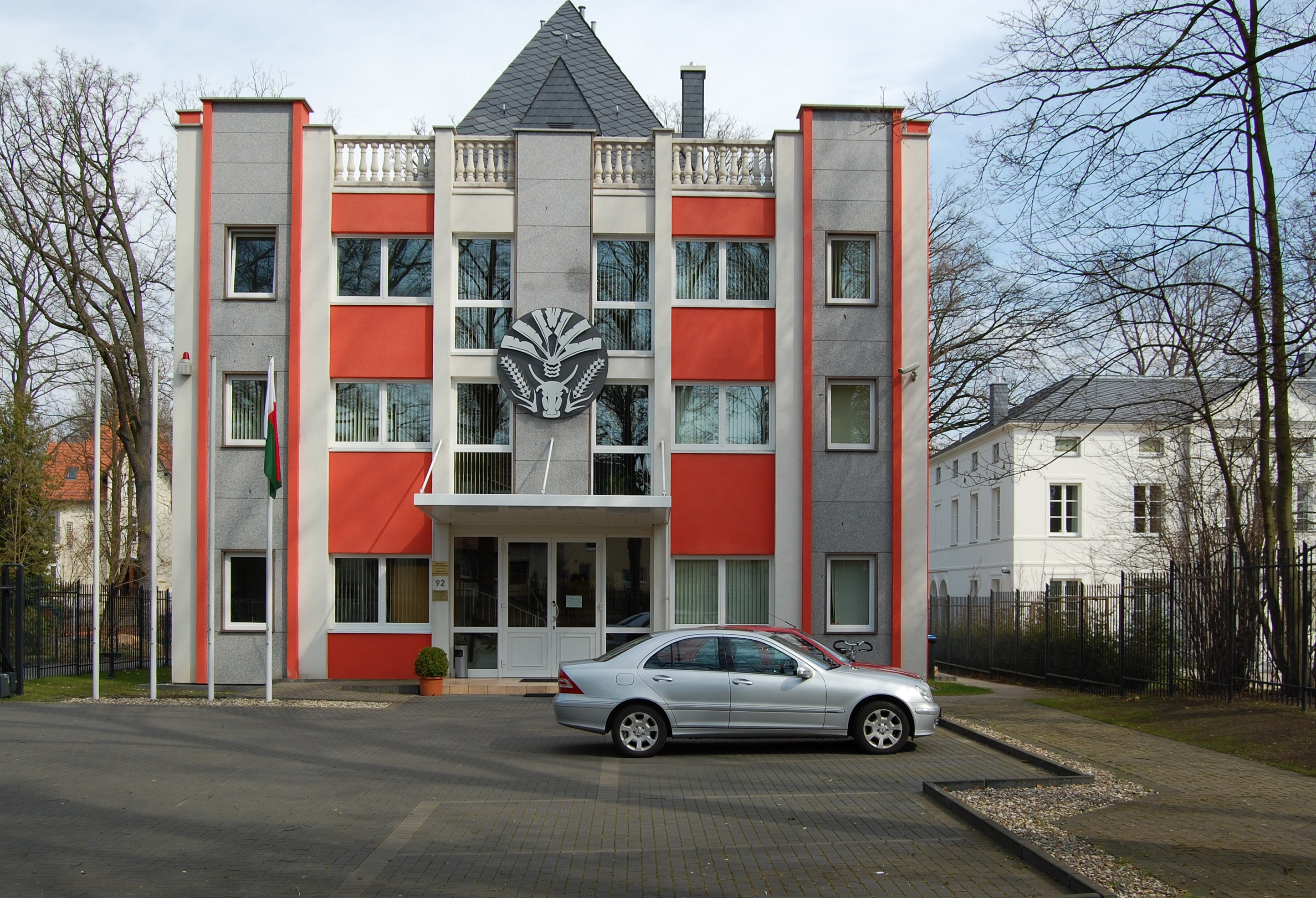
Embassy in Berlin

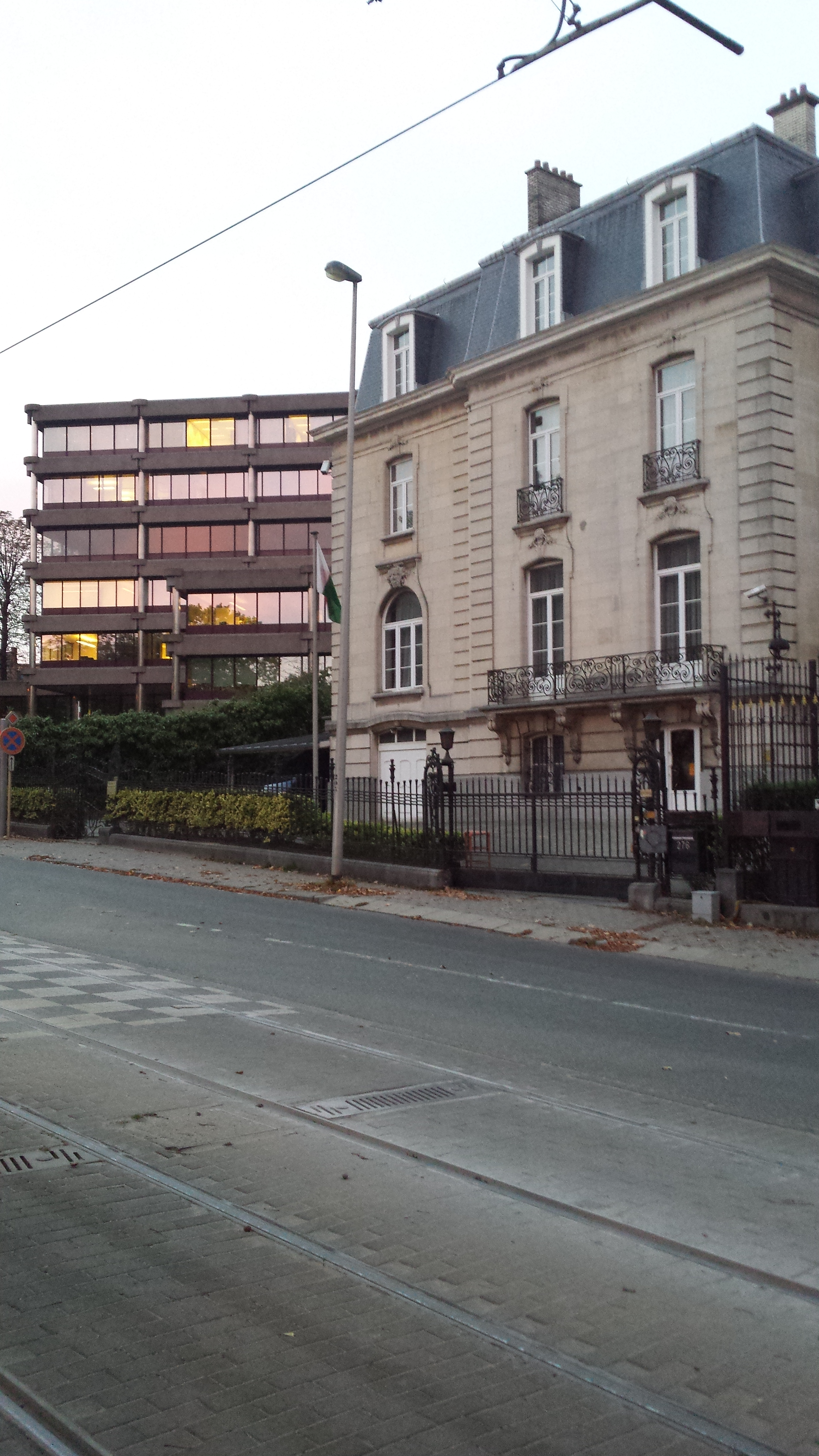
Embassy in Brussels

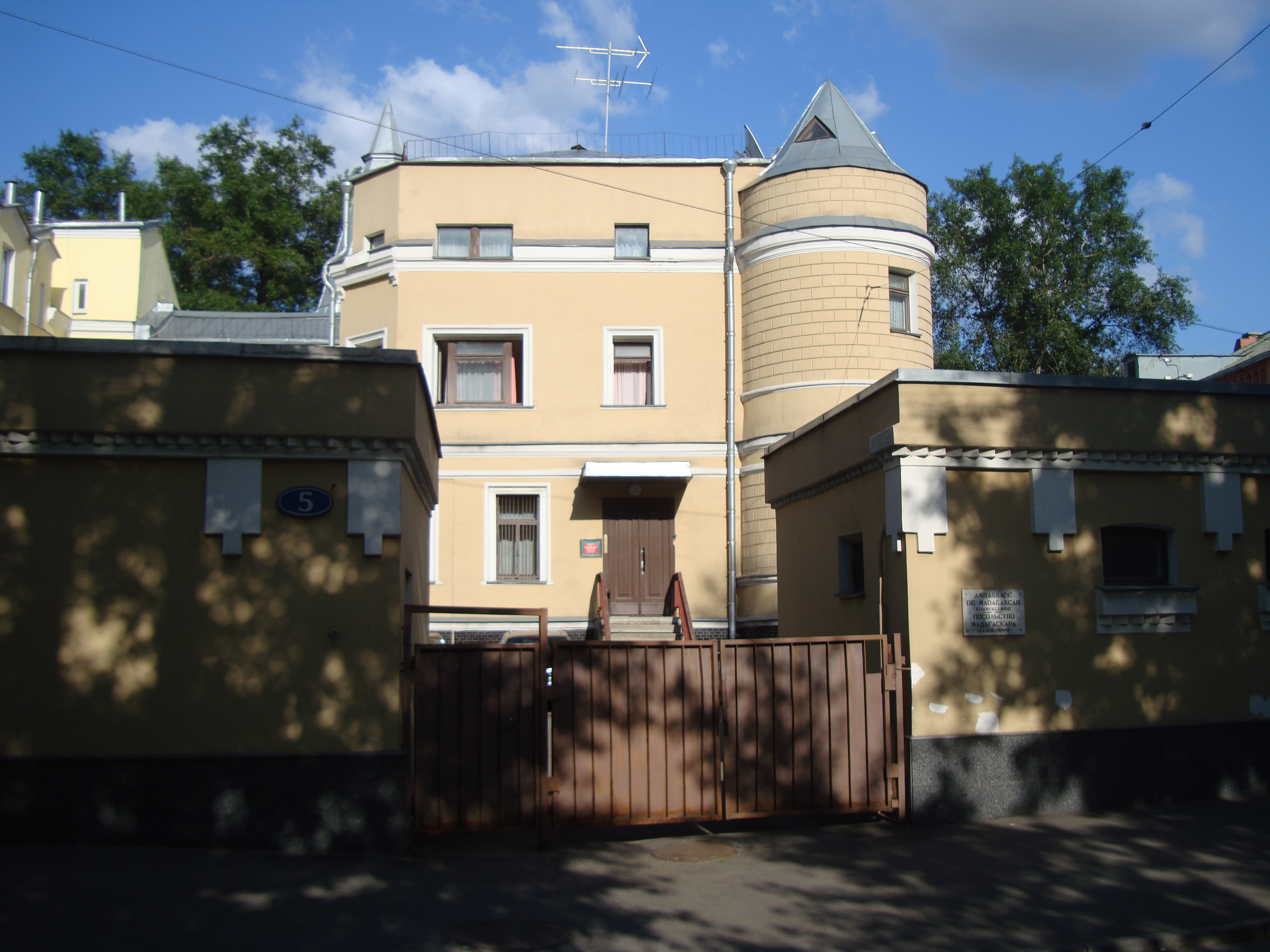
Embassy in Moscow

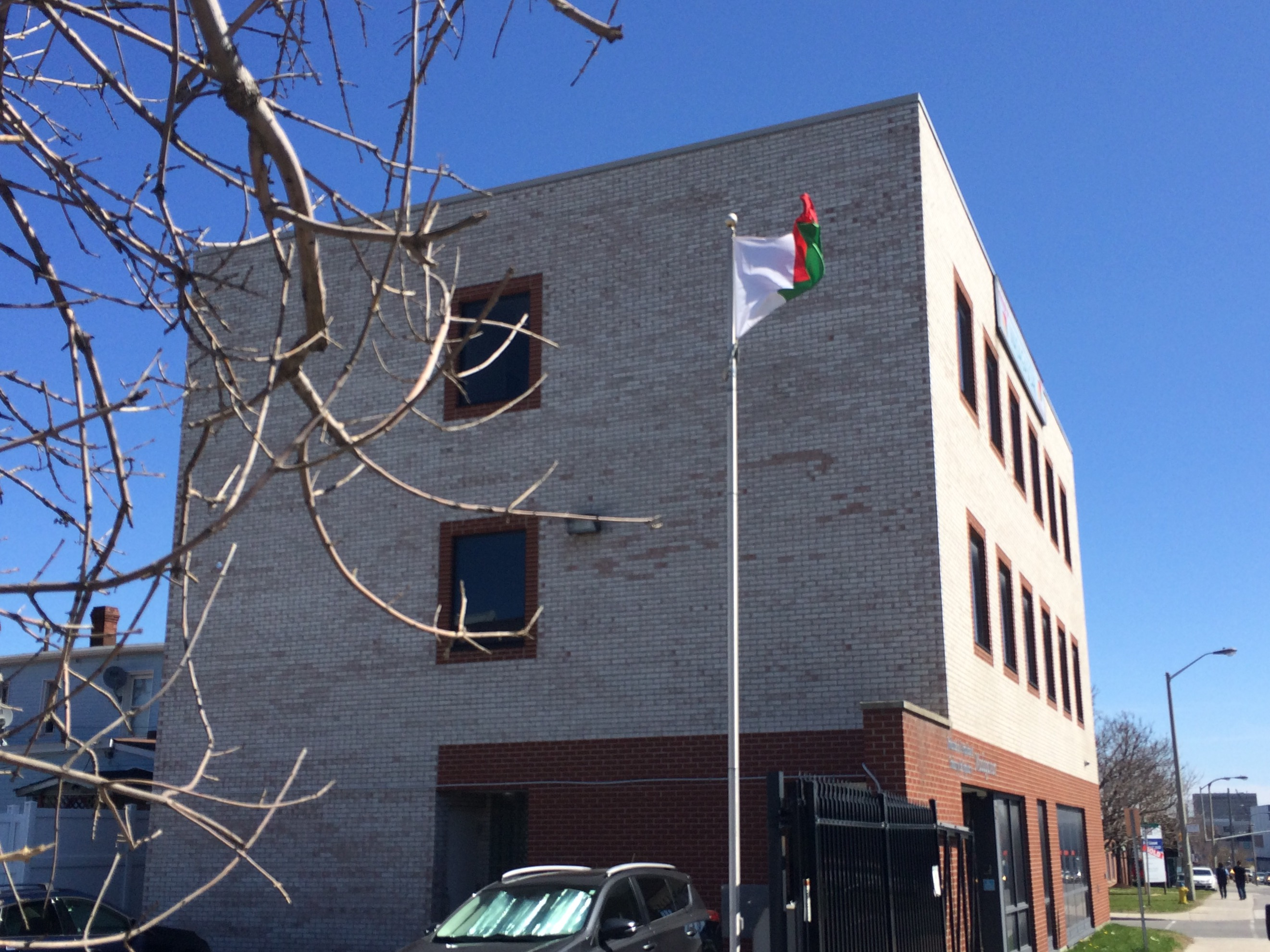
Embassy in Ottawa

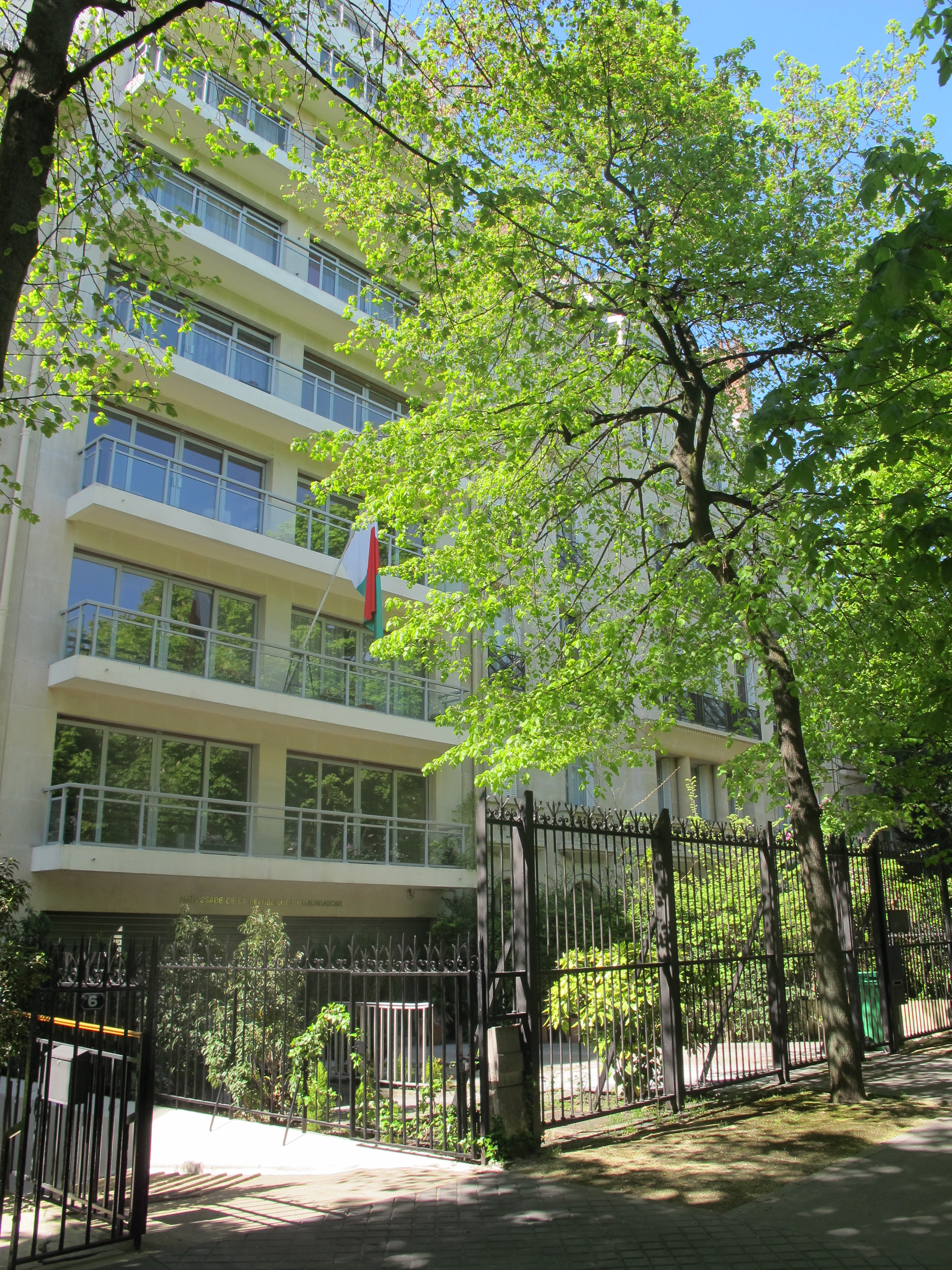
Embassy in Paris

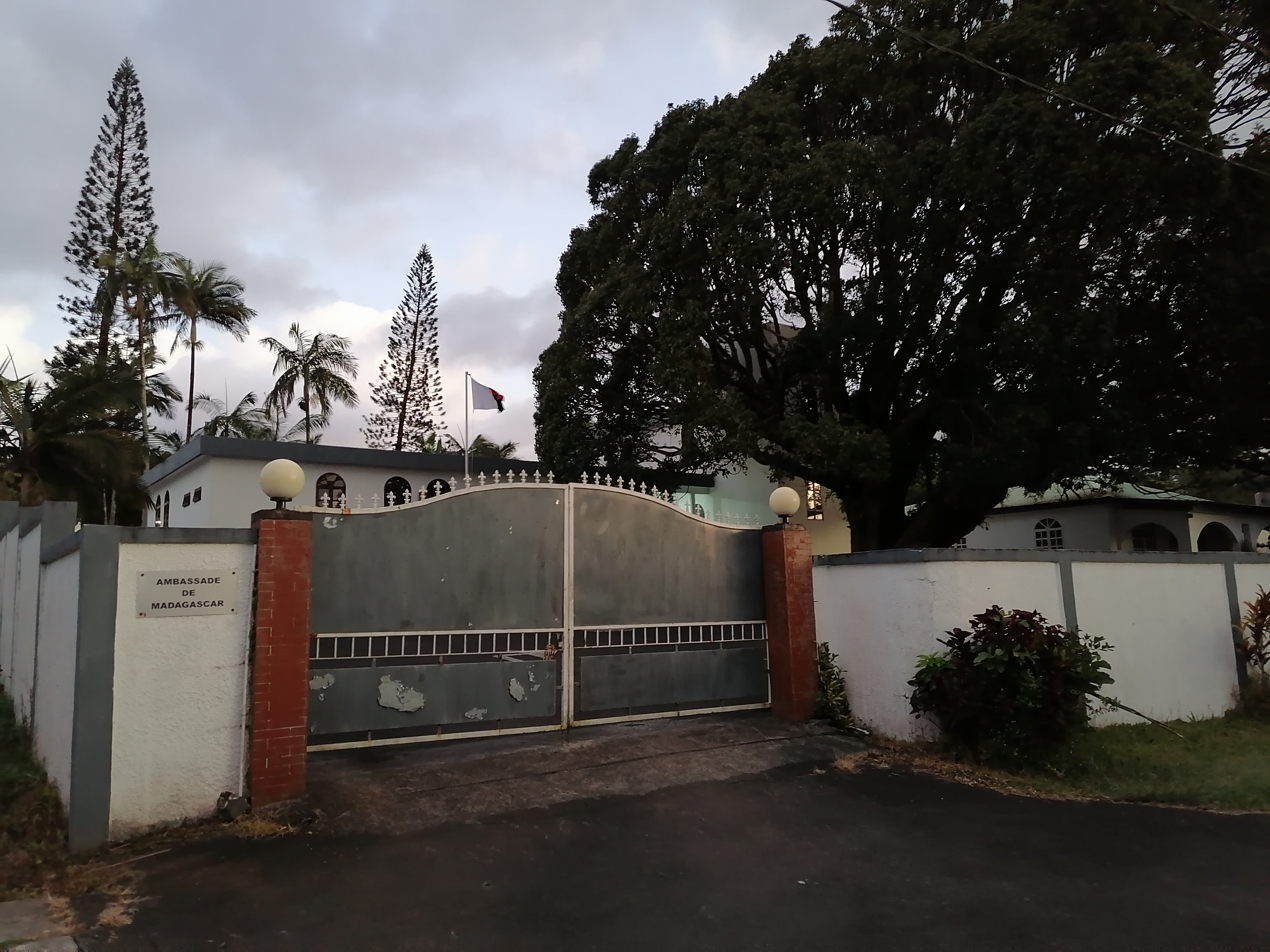
Embassy in Port Louis

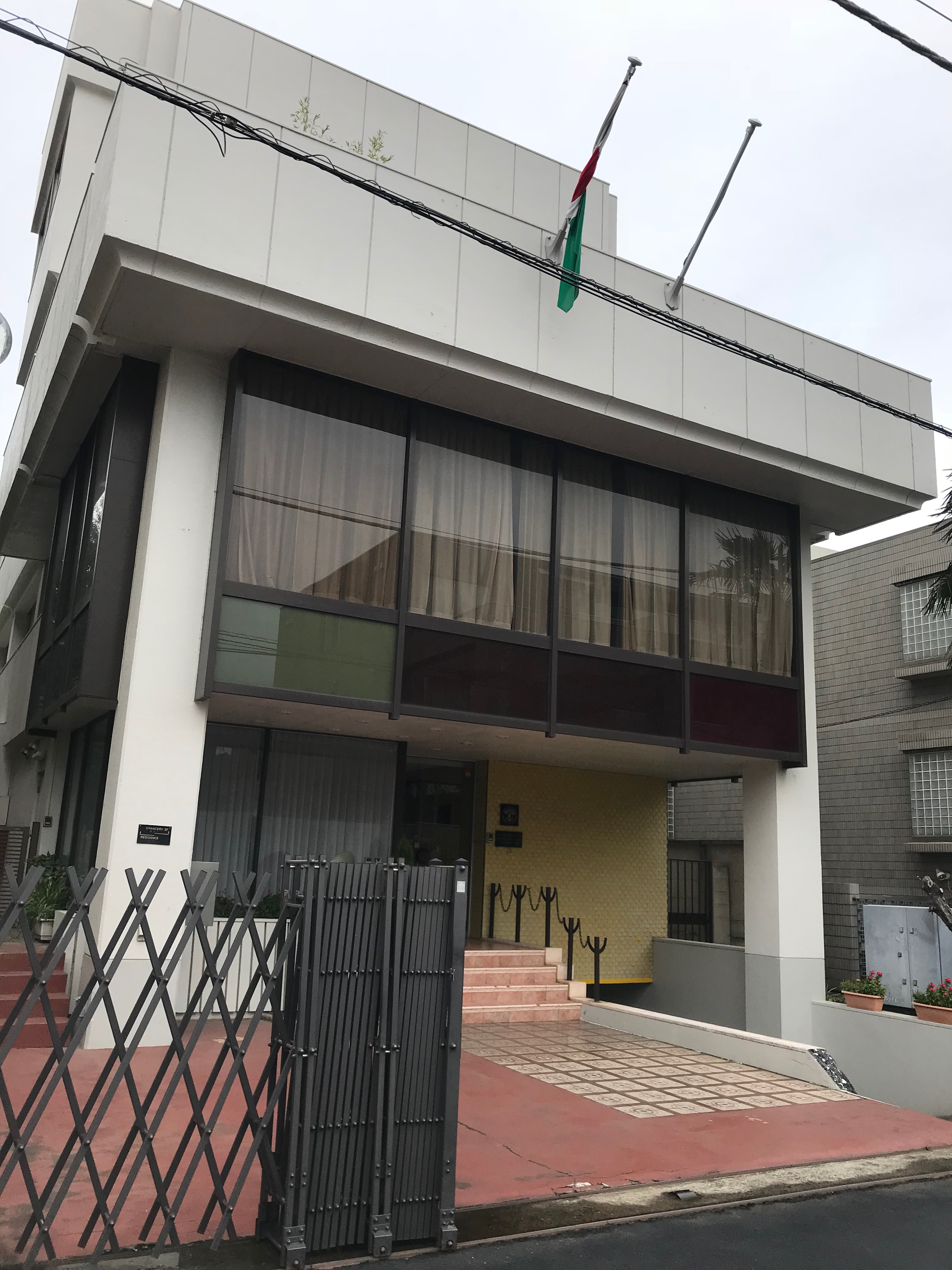
Embassy in Tokyo

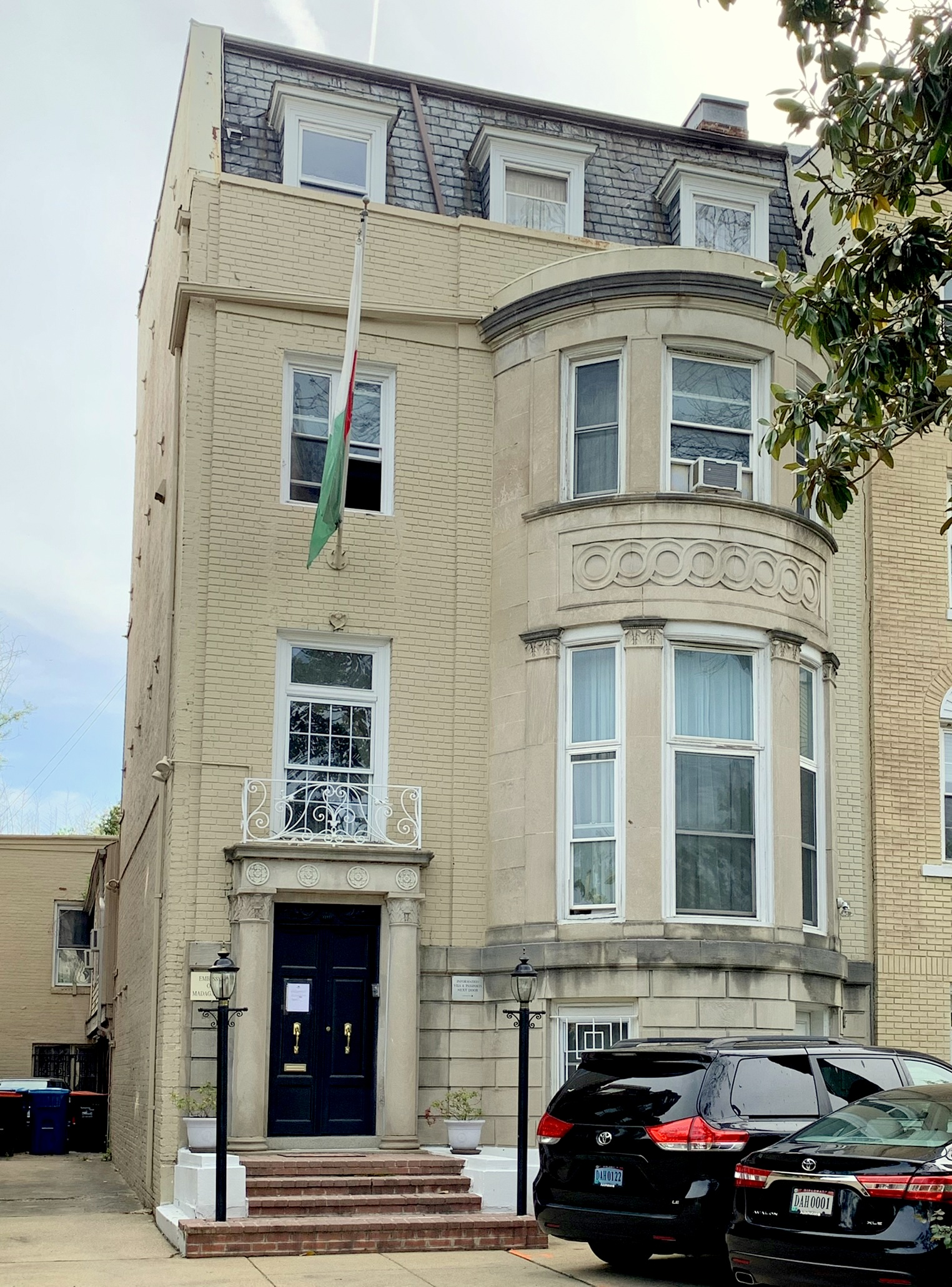
Embassy in Washington, D.C.

== Closed missions ==
Host country	Host city	Mission	Year closed	Ref.
Comoros	Moroni	Embassy	Unknown	
Libya	Tripoli	Embassy	2013	

== See also ==
- Foreign relations of Madagascar
- List of diplomatic missions in Madagascar
- Visa policy of Madagascar
