= Madagascar–South Africa relations =

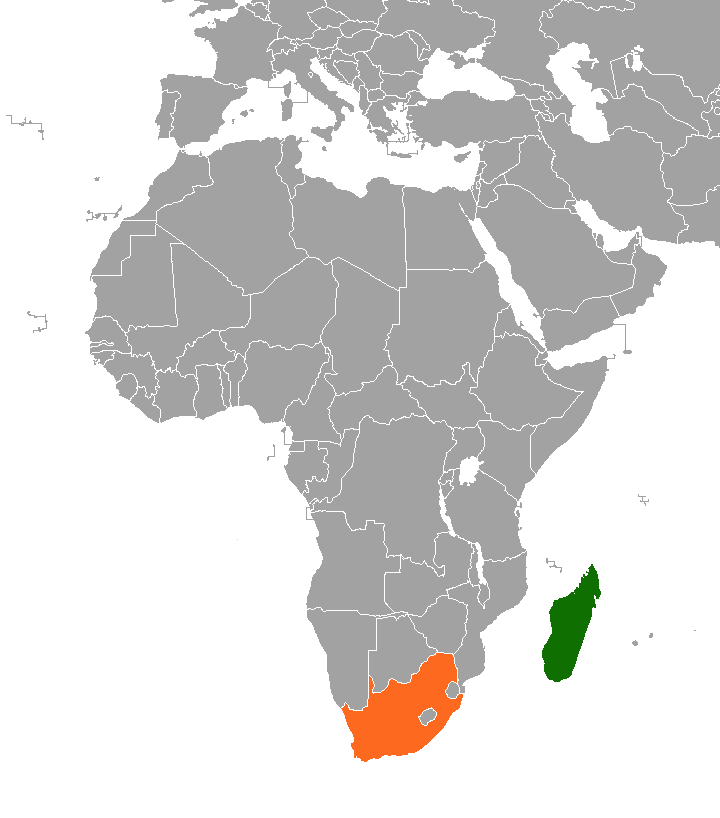
- Madagascar: South Africa

Madagascar–South Africa relations refers to the diplomatic relations between Madagascar and South Africa. Both nations are members of the African Union, Group of 77, Non-Aligned Movement and the Southern African Development Community.

== History ==
Madagascar and South Africa are two neighboring countries in Southern Africa with a long history. Early known contact between both nations occurred with Bantu migration to Madagascar and during Arab trading between Madagascar and continental Africa. In 1652, Dutch colonists began importing people for slavery from Indonesia and Madagascar to South Africa. In 1766, captured Malagasy's rebelled on a Dutch slave ship called Die Meermin on its way to Cape Town. The Malagasy had been sold to the Dutch East India Company on Madagascar to be used as company slaves in its Cape Colony. During the mutiny half the ship's crew and almost 30 Malagasy lost their lives and the two surviving leaders of the mutiny were sent to Robben Island where they remained until their deaths. The incident became known as the Meermin slave mutiny.

During the struggle against Apartheid, the Malagasy government hosted and supported South African liberation movements, and the Malagasy government allowed them access to its public broadcasting facilities for their fight against apartheid. Radio Freedom was operated by South African freedom fighters in Madagascar between 1979 and 1993. In June 1991, apartheid legislation was repealed in South Africa and Nelson Mandela was elected President in May 1994. That same year, Madagascar and South Africa officially established diplomatic relations.

During the 2009 Malagasy political crisis, Malagasy President Marc Ravalomanana fled to South Africa where he remained in exile for the next 5 years. In August 2012, South African President Jacob Zuma traveled to the Seychelles to assist in brokering a deal between Madagascar's President Andry Rajoelina and Marc Ravalomanana. In January 2014, President Rajoelina stepped down from power.

There have been several high level meetings between leaders of both nations in various international forums. In 2017, Malagasy President Hery Rajaonarimampianina held a business and trade conference to encourage more South African investment in Madagascar, particularly in the energy, infrastructure, tourism and mining sectors.

== Bilateral relations ==
Both nations have signed several bilateral agreements such as an Agreement on Air Transport (1990); Agreement on Merchant Shipping and Related Maritime Matters (1990); Agreement on the Exchange of Representatives, Privileges and Diplomatic Immunity (1991); Agreement on the Exchange of Notes to Establish Diplomatic Relations (1994); Agreement on Cooperation between the City of Antananarivo and Pretoria (1996); Agreement on the Exchange of Notes on work for spouses of diplomatic officials (2006); Agreement on the Promotion and Protection of Investments (2006) and an Agreement on Science and Technology Cooperation (2015).

== Transportation ==
There are direct flights between Madagascar and South Africa with the following airline: Airlink

== Trade ==
In 2014, trade between Madagascar and South Africa totaled $320 million USD. Madagascar's main exports to South Africa include: Lychees, coal and textiles. South Africa's main exports to Madagascar include: machinery and mechanical appliances; vehicles, aircraft and transport equipment; foodstuffs and beverages; and chemical products. South African multinational companies such as Ceres Fruit Juices and Shoprite operate in Madagascar.

== Resident diplomatic missions ==
- Madagascar has an embassy in Pretoria and a consulate-general in Cape Town.
- South Africa has an embassy in Antananarivo.

== See also ==
- Foreign relations of Madagascar
- Foreign relations of South Africa
