= Madagascar–Russia relations =

- Madagascar: Russia

Madagascar–Russia relations are the bilateral foreign relations between Madagascar and Russia. The establishment of diplomatic relations between Madagascar and the Soviet Union started on September 29, 1972. Russia has an embassy in Antananarivo. Madagascar has an embassy in Moscow.

== History ==
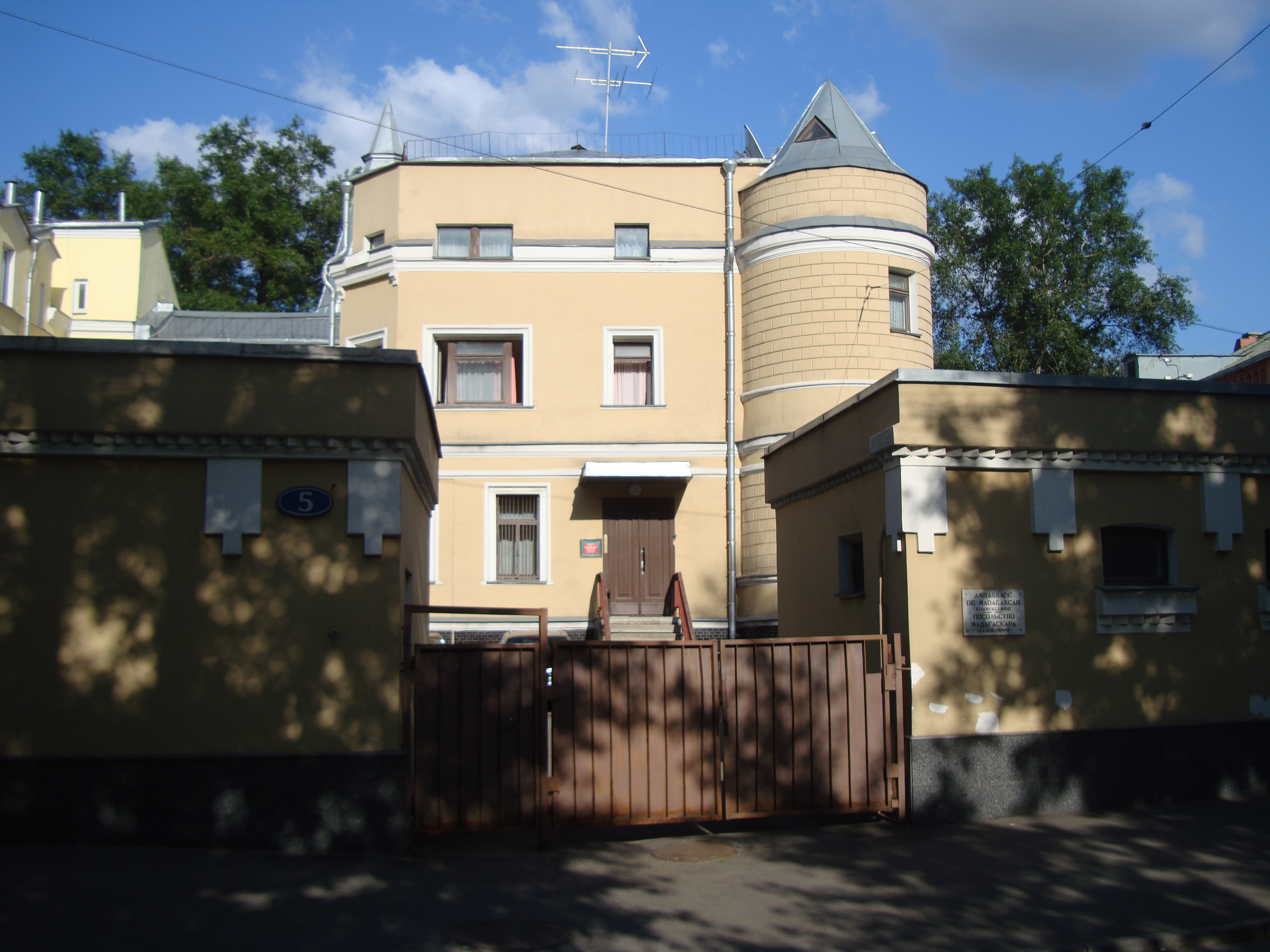
Embassy of Madagascar in Moscow

During the 2009 Malagasy political crisis, Russia's Foreign Minister Sergey Lavrov stated that Russia is "concerned by the increased frequency of attempts on the African continent to resort to non-constitutional methods of solving internal political problems." He went on to say that, in addition to increasing economic and social problems, the use of force is of concern and runs counter to democratic principles, whilst affirming Russia's support of the African Union's position.

According to The New York Times, the 2018 Madagascar elections saw Russian operatives commonly being seen walking the streets of Madagascar's capital with "backpacks full of cash" as well as "packets of gold and precious stones" which the Russians used to bribe journalists, candidates, students, and others to influence the election outcome. One key objective of the Russian interference campaign was to protect Yevgeny Prigozhin's "growing military and commercial footprint" in Africa.

== Trade relations ==
In 2021, Russia exported $41.2M to Madagascar (mostly wheat, around 95% of exports) while Madagascar exported $9.79M to Russia. This figure is led by graphite (12.8%) and preserved foods (15.8%)

== See also ==
- List of ambassadors of Russia to Madagascar
- Foreign relations of Madagascar
- Foreign relations of Russia
