= Ravalomanana =

Ravalomanana is a Malagasy surname. Notable people with this surname include:

- Lalao Ravalomanana (born 1953), first lady of Madagascar
- Marc Ravalomanana (born 1949), sixth President of Madagascar
- Richard Ravalomanana (born 1959), Acting President of Madagascar
