= AR1 highway =

Malagasy toll road

Autoroute Antananarivo–Toamasina
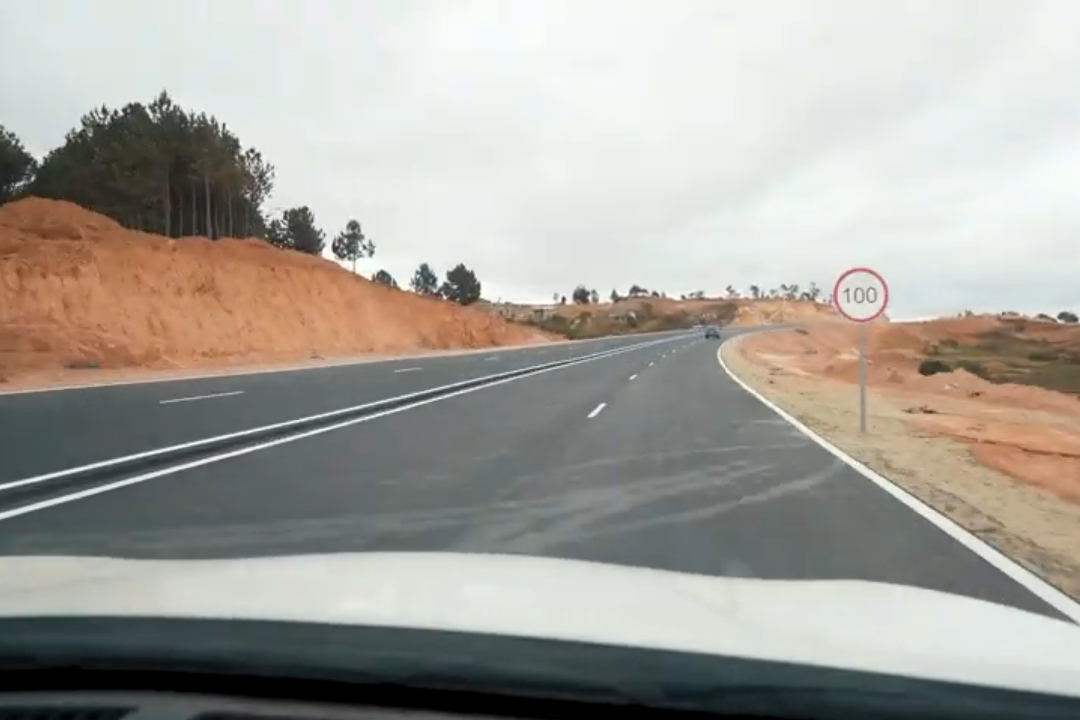

Route information
- Length: 260 km (160 mi)
- Restrictions: Toll road

Major junctions
- East end: Antananarivo
- Route nationale 4; Route nationale 44
- West end: Toamasina

Location
- Country: Madagascar

Highway system
- Roads in Madagascar

The AR1 highway (French: Autoroute AR1) is a toll highway under construction in Madagascar that will connect the Malagasy capital of Antananarivo with the port city of Toamasina. Construction, overseen by Egyptian firm Samcrete, began in December 2022 with a projected cost of $1 billion over four years to build. It will be the first toll highway in Madagascar, and will reduce the distance required to travel from Antananarivo to Madagascar's largest port by 110 kilometers (68 mi) and is expected to reduce typical travel time by between five-and-a-half and seven-and-a-half hours. Upon the toll highway's completion, drivers in Madagascar will be permitted to drive the 260-kilometer (160 mi) road at a pace of 120 km/h (75 mph). Tolls for passenger cars will be 15,000 Malagasy ariary (3.92 United States dollars), while tolls for heavy trucks will be 20,000 ariary (US$5.22).

== Construction ==
As construction of the first toll highway in Madagascar began in December 2022, the project was expected to take four years from start to completion and cost about $1 billion. In November 2022, Samcrete, an Egyptian engineering and construction firm with operations across Africa and the Middle East, was awarded the contract to lead the project.

Construction will take place in stages, the first of which is expected to be finished before President Andry Rajoelina's current term ends at the end of 2023. As of May 2023, 20 kilometers of the planned highway have been constructed.

== Route information and tolls ==
Upon completion, Autoroute Antananarivo–Toamasina will have its western terminus in Tsarasaotra, Anjozorobe, and its eastern terminus in Toamasina. Along the way, from west-to-east, it will pass through Sabotsy Namehana, Ambohimanga Rova, Talata Volonondry, Anjozorobe, and Andaingo en route to Toamasina. The highway will intersect with Route nationale 4, where an interchange will be constructed, and will join Route nationale 44 along its route.

The route will be a toll road; light vehicles will be charged a toll of 15,000 Malagasy ariary (3.92 United States dollars), while heavy trucks will be charged a toll of 20,000 ariary (US$5.22). In December 2022, the minister of public works, Jerry Hatrefindrazana, stated that the planned toll road will have "4 lanes, 6 toll stations, 3 rest areas, with special devices such as cameras, radars, lighting, as well as vehicle counting and incident detection equipment".

== Projected impact ==
The planned Antananarivo–Toamasina route is designed to be a faster and shorter alternative to Route nationale 2 and aims to serve as a strategic economic investment that connects Madagascar's capital with its largest seaport. The President of Madagascar, Andry Rajoelina, said in a press release that the road was expected to increase activity at the port threefold and that the construction would reduce the travel distance between the capital and the port from 370 km (230 mi) to 260 km (160 mi), lowering the typical travel time from 8 to 10 hours down to an average of 2.5 hours. Gasoline consumption along the toll road is also expected to be lower than existing routes between the two cities; a typical passenger car is only expected to consume 25 liters (6.6 U.S. gal) of gasoline when traversing the length of the new road, and a heavy truck is expected to consume only 85 liters (22 U.S. gal). The road will be Madagascar's first toll highway, and the speed limit will be set to 120 km/h (75 mph).

The government expects the planned highway to boost the economy by facilitating trade and movement of goods and people, and by creating service jobs through planned development of hotels, restaurants, service stations, artisanal pavilions, and small traders of fresh produce including exotic fruits. The project has been a source of controversy between government authorities and certain segments of the population. The new highway is expected to adversely affect farmers whose fields it will pass through, and some civil society groups worry that the construction of the road will lead to the felling of virgin forest. Nevertheless, EGAAD, one of the Egyptian companies involved in construction, stressed that the highway was expected to reduce CO_{2} emissions by 25 to 30 percent. In December 2022, 104 plots of land in Talata Volonondry were identified for expropriation for construction purposes. In March 2023, in response to questions about how the compensation process would work, the new minister of public works, Ndria-mihaja Livah Andriana-Behina, stated that the ministry was focused on regularizing the files of the owners of expropriated property.

== Financing ==
As of December 2022, the government expected the project to cost $924 million, 80 percent of which would be financed through external sources. The remaining 20 percent would be financed through state funds, of which 300 billion Malagasy ariary was being released in advance.

=== Corruption allegations ===
One week after the launch of the construction project, Roland Ratsiraka, deputy for Toamasina and former minister of public works, accused the government authorities of corruption, pointing out that there had been no call for tenders for the project, nor environmental permit was issued and that no compensations were paid to expropriated landowners Ratsiraka told journalists that the highway was a "deception" intended to release state funds from the Ministry of Finance and Budgets, and argued that operators carrying out road maintenance in recent years had not yet been paid. He and a group of deputies opposed to the project started to campaign for a motion of censure, and called for the resignation of the minister of economy and finance, Rindra Hasimbelo Rabarinirinarison, and the minister of public works, Jerry Hatrefindrazana.

In response, President Andry Rajoelina's government reiterated that the projected economic benefits of the planned highway were significant. Government representatives insisted that the proper procurement procedures had been followed in securing the public contract, which had been decided following a "restricted" call for tenders. In addition, they stressed the amount of funding coming from external sources, and that Minister Rabarinirinarison was in the process of negotiating terms, after meeting with potential donors and partners at the annual meetings of the IMF and the World Bank in Washington, D.C., in October 2022.

== See also ==
- Driving in Madagascar
