= Alakamisy =

Alakamisy may refer to the following towns in central Madagascar:

- Alakamisy, Antananarivo - a village in Analamanga, Madagascar.
- Alakamisy, Antsirabe II - a village in Antsirabe II District, Vakinankaratra, Madagascar.
- Alakamisy, Fianarantsoa - a village in Haute Matsiatra, Madagascar.
- Alakamisy Marososona in Vakinankaratra, Madagascar.
- Alakamisy Anativato in Vakinankaratra, Madagascar.
- Alakamisy Itenina - a village in Haute Matsiatra, Madagascar.
- Alakamisy Ambohimaha - a village in Haute Matsiatra, Madagascar.
- Alakamisy Ambohimahazo a village in Amoron'i Mania, Madagascar.
