= Imerina enin-toko =

Historical sixfold division of Imerina

Imerina enin-toko (six provinces of Imerina) refers to the six provinces of Imerina established by Andrianampoinimerina following the unification of Imerina proper and the annexation of neighboring kingdoms.

== History ==
Before the death of Andriamasinavalona, Imerina proper was divided among his sons in the form of semi-autonomous principalities, known as Imerina efa-toko. These divisions allowed each son to govern a portion of the kingdom while maintaining allegiance to their father.

After the death of Andriamasinavalona, his son Andriantsimitoviaminandrianjaka did not respect his father’s will concerning the four divisions of Imerina efa-toko and conquered the kingdom of his brother Andrianavalonimerina, centered at Ambohitrabiby. This annexation led to the formation of a unified northern kingdom, later known as Avaradrano, from which Andrianampoinimerina became king. The other principalities, including Marovatana and Imerina Atsimo, remained independent until their eventual unification under Andrianampoinimerina.

Following the unification of Imerina efa-toko, Andrianampoinimerina expanded his kingdom by annexing territories including Imamo, Andratsay, Vonizongo, Fisakana and Ambositra. This reorganization gave rise to the sixfold provincial structure known as Imerina enin-toko.

== The six provinces ==
Six provinces of Imerina
#	Province	Capital
1	Avaradrano	Ambohimanga / Antananarivo
2	Vakinisaosy	Alasora
3	Marovatana	Ambohidratrimo
4	Ambodirano	Fenoarivo
5	Vonizongo	Ankazobe
6	Vakinankaratra	Betafo

== See also ==
- Imerina
- Valalafotsy
