= Andratsay =

Malagasy kingdom

Kingdom of Andrantsay Fanjakan'I Andratsay (Malagasy)
- Mid 1600s–Late 1790s
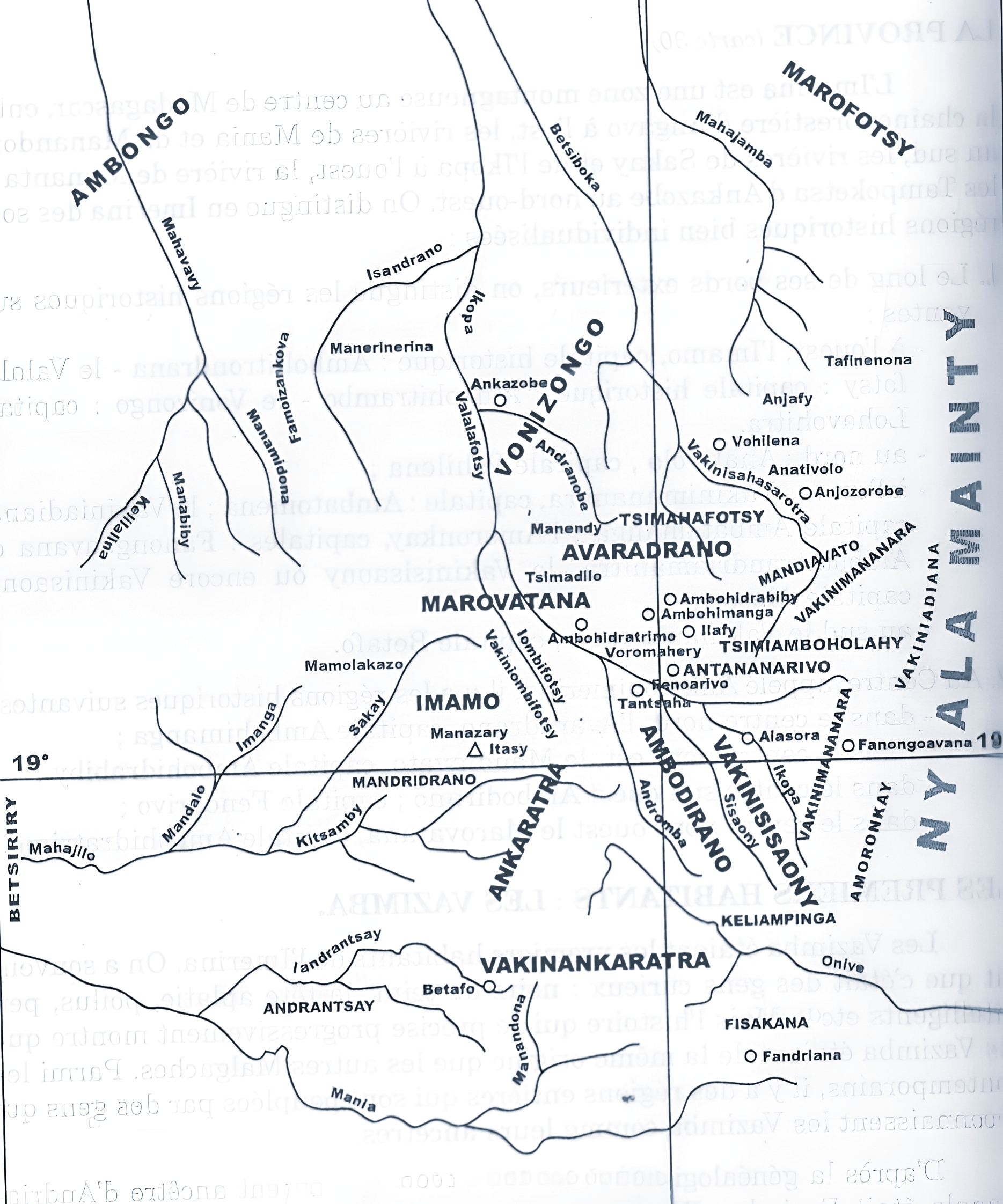
- Provinces of the Imerina Kingdom with the former Kingdom of Andrantsay in the southwest. The Andratsay River is visible on the map. Andrantsay is part of Vakinankaratra, like Fikasana to the left.
- Capital: Fihavanana
- Common languages: Vakinankaratra
- Religion: Traditional beliefs
- Government: Absolute monarchy
- Historical era: Pre-colonial
  - Foundation: Mid 1600s
  - Disestablished: Late 1790s
Succeeded by
Merina kingdom
- Today part of: Madagascar

Andratsay was a kingdom in the region of Vakinankaratra in central Madagascar. It is named after the river of Andrantsay near Betafo.

== History ==
The kingdom of Andrantsay was founded in the 1600s by Andrianony from Alasora, a contemporary of Andriamasinavalona. He built the kingdom by uniting the original inhabitants of the region and migrants from Imerina. During the 18th century, the kingdom became a vassal of Menabe and many migrants from the West integrated into the kingdom as well as refugees from Imerina kingdoms during the Imerina civil wars. The kingdom is the first inland malagasy kingdom to be documented when the French traveller Nicolas Mayeur reported his time there in his work Voyage au pays d'Ancove. In the late 1790s it was annexed into Imerina kingdom as part of the Imerina enin-toko under the name of Vakinankaratra.

== Location ==
Andrantsay includes most of the region of Vakinankaratra and some part of Itasy.
