= Anosy Avaratra =

- Location in Madagascar
- Coordinates: 18°48′S 47°33′E
- Country: Madagascar
- Region: Analamanga
- District: Antananarivo Avaradrano
- Established: October 2015

Government
  - Mayor: Luc Razafimahefa

Area
  - Land: 6 km^{2} (2.3 sq mi)
- Elevation: 1,350 m (4,430 ft)

Population (2019)
  - Total: 15,243
- Time zone: UTC3 (EAT)
- postal code: 103

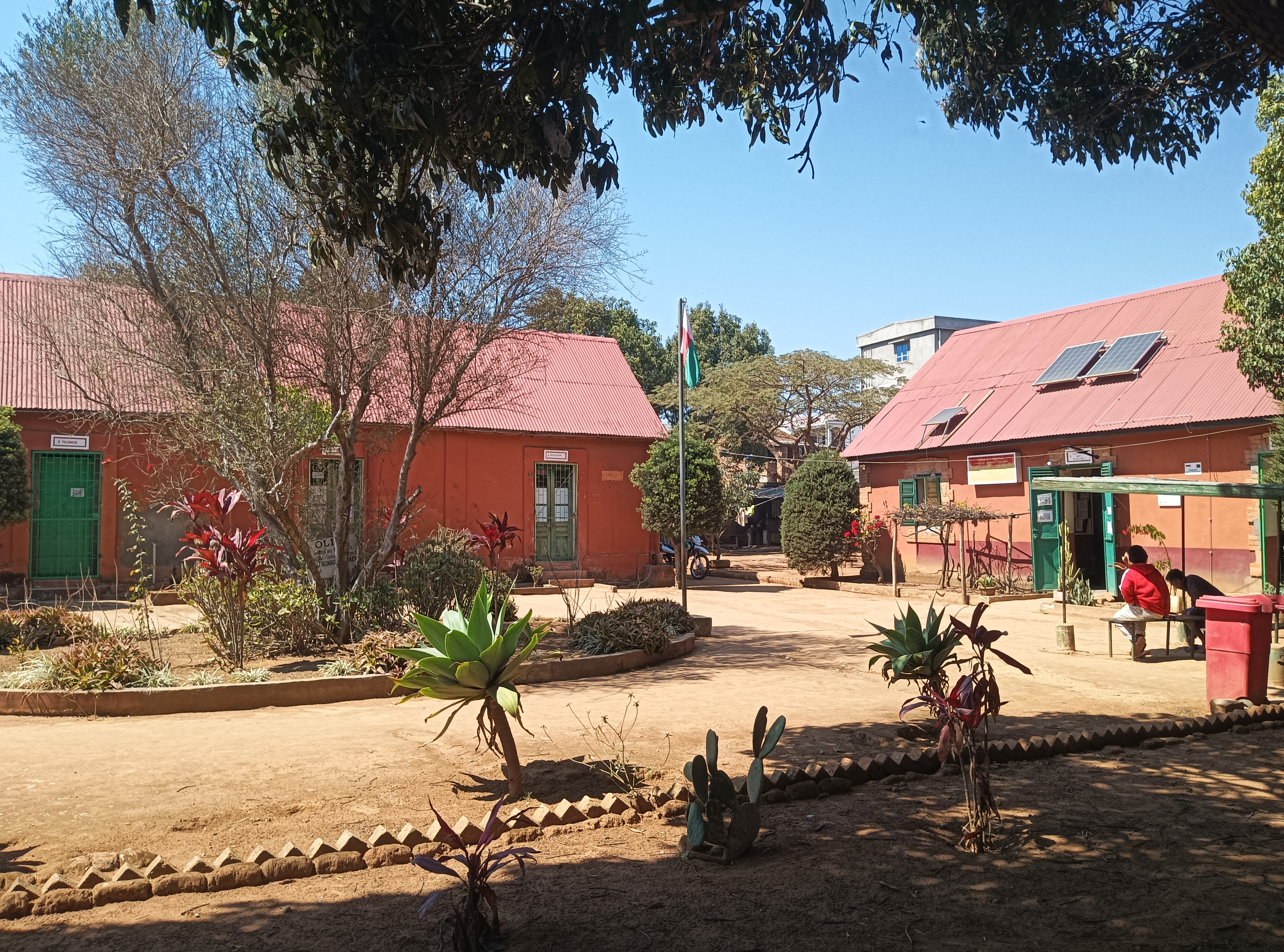
Medical center in Anosy Avaratra

Anosy Avaratra is a rural municipality in Analamanga Region, in the Central Highlands of Madagascar. It belongs to the district of Antananarivo Avaradrano and its population numbers to 15,243 in 2019.

It is a relatively new municipality that was split off from Sabotsy Namehana only in October 2015. It is located in the North of Antananarivo along the NationalRoad3. Five Fokontany (villages) make up the territory of this municipality: Anosy Avaratra (Anosimiarinimerina), Ambohitrinimanga, Isahafa, Lazaina and Faravohitra.

== Economy ==
The economy is based on substantial agriculture. Rice, corn, peanuts, beans, manioc are the main crops.
