= Imerina efa-toko =

Historical division of the Kingdom of Imerina into four regions

Imerina efa-toko ("four districts of Imerina") refers to the historical territorial division corresponding to the territory of authentic Imerina or Imerina proper in Madagascar.

The four divisions are attributed to Andriamasinavalona. He assigned each of his four sons, born to different mothers, a principality. These remained semi-autonomous during his lifetime and became independent kingdoms after his death, leading to civil wars within Imerina.

Four principalities of Imerina propre and mother of each rulers
Principality	Capital	Ruler	Mother
Eastern Imerina	Ambohimanga	Andriantsimitoviaminandrianjaka	Ratompoindroandriana
Southern Imerina (Imerina Atsimo)	Antananarivo	Andrianjakanavalomandimby	Ramananimerina
Western Imerina (Marovatana)	Ambohidratrimo	Andriantomponimerina	Ramananandrianjaka
Northern Imerina	Ambohitrabiby	Andrianavalonimerina	Rasolomananambonitany

== See also ==
- Imerina enin-toko
- Andrianampoinimerina
