= Ambohimirary =

- Location in Madagascar
- Coordinates: 18°20′S 47°43′E
- Country: Madagascar
- Region: Analamanga
- District: Anjozorobe
- Established: 2003

Area
  - Total: 100 km^{2} (39 sq mi)
- Elevation: 1,350 m (4,430 ft)

Population (2017)
  - Total: 7,261
- Time zone: UTC3 (EAT)
- postal code: 107

Ambohimirary is a rural municipality in Analamanga Region, in the Central Highlands of Madagascar. It belongs to the district of Anjozorobe and its populations numbers to 7,261 in 2017. It is situated at 35 km north-west of Anjozorobe.

It was created in 2003. Before that date, the municipality belonged to the municipality of Analaroa.
