= Mangamila =

- Town
- Location within Madagascar
- Coordinates: 18°34′00″S 47°51′30″E
- Country: Madagascar
- Region: Analamanga
- District: Anjozorobe

Area
  - Total: 254 km^{2} (98 sq mi)
- Elevation: 1,358 m (4,455 ft)

Population 2018
  - Total: 14,640
- Time zone: UTC+3 (EAT)
- postal code: 107

Mangamila is a municipality in the Analamanga Region, Madagascar, 69 km north-east of the capital Antananarivo, in the district of Anjozorobe.

It has a population of 14,640 inhabitants in 2018.

== Routes ==
The town is linked with Antananarivo and Anjozorobe by the National Road 3.

== Economy ==
The economy is based on agriculture. Rice, corn, peanuts, beans, manioc, soya and onions are the main crops.

== Rivers ==
Mangamila lies on the Mananara river. Also the Sahavinaky crosses the municipality.
