= Mahaiza =

- Location in Madagascar
- Coordinates: 19°54′S 46°49′E
- Country: Madagascar
- Region: Vakinankaratra
- District: Betafo

Area
  - Total: 480 km^{2} (190 sq mi)
- Elevation: 1,594 m (5,230 ft)

Population (2018)
  - Total: 24,244
  - Ethnicities: Merina
- Time zone: UTC3 (EAT)
- Code Postal: 113

Mahaiza is a town and commune in Madagascar. It belongs to the district of Betafo, which is a part of Vakinankaratra Region. The population of the commune was estimated to be approximately 24,244 in 2018 and is situated at 8.3 km south west from Betafo.

11 Fokontany (villages) belong to the commune: Mahaiza, Ambohimanamora, Ambohimalaza, Mahazina, Ankafotra, Fenoarivo, Marotsiraka, Ambohitrananana, Ambalamarina, Miandrarivo and Mandoa.

Primary and junior level secondary education are available in town. The majority 98% of the population of the commune are farmers, while an additional 2% receives their livelihood from raising livestock. The most important crop is rice, while other important products are beans and cassava.

== Ethnics ==
The town is principally inhabited by Merino people followed by Betsileo.
