= Anjozorobe District =

Anjozorobe
- District
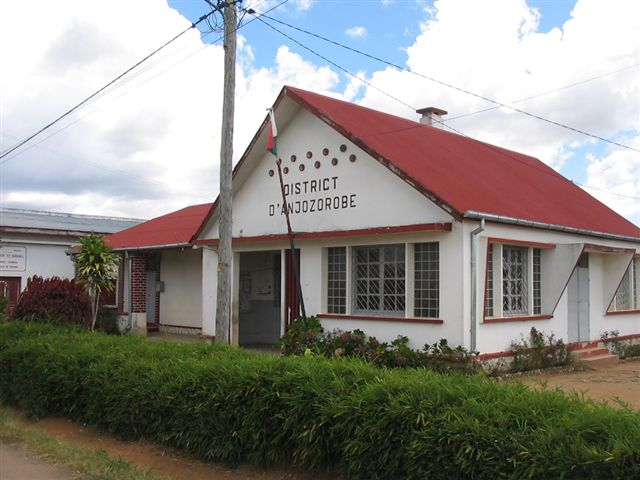

- Location within Madagascar
- Coordinates: 18°24′12″S 47°51′00″E
- Country: Madagascar
- Region: Analamanga

Area
  - Total: 4,292 km^{2} (1,657 sq mi)

Population (2018)
  - Total: 442,244
- postal code: 107

Anjozorobe is a district of Analamanga in Madagascar.

== Communes ==
The district is further divided into 19 communes:

- Alakamisy
- Ambatomanoina
- Amboasary
- Ambohibary Vohilena
- Ambohimanarina Marovazaha
- Ambohimirary
- Ambongamarina
- Analaroa
- Andranomisa
- Androvakely
- Anjozorobe
- Antanetibe Anativolo
- Belanitra
- Beronono
- Betatao
- Mangamila
- Marotsipoy
- Tsarasaotra, Anjozorobe

== Roads ==
The district is crossed by the National road 3.

== Nature reserves ==
The Anjozorobe-Angavo Reserve is situated approximately 11 km East of the town of Anjozorobe.
