= Mandritsara, Betafo =

Mandritsara
- Location in Madagascar
- Coordinates: 19°33′S 47°3′E
- Country: Madagascar
- Region: Vakinankaratra
- District: Betafo
- Elevation: 2,038 m (6,686 ft)

Population (2001)
  - Total: 13,000
  - Ethnicities: Merina
- Time zone: UTC3 (EAT)

Mandritsara is a town and commune in Madagascar. It belongs to the district of Betafo, which is a part of Vakinankaratra Region. The population of the commune was estimated to be approximately 13,000 in 2001 commune census.

Only primary schooling is available. The majority 80% of the population of the commune are farmers, while an additional 20% receives their livelihood from raising livestock. The most important crops are rice and potatoes, while other important agricultural products are beans, maize and soya.
