= José Martial Ranaivo =

Malagasy politician

José Martial Ranaivo is a Malagasy politician. A member of the National Assembly of Madagascar, he was elected as a member of the Tiako i Madagasikara party; he represents the constituency of Anjozorobe.
