= Ambatomanoina =

- Location in Madagascar
- Coordinates: 18°19′S 47°37′E
- Country: Madagascar
- Region: Analamanga
- District: Anjozorobe

Population (2018)
  - Total: 21,779
- Time zone: UTC3 (EAT)
- postal code: 107

Ambatomanoina is a rural municipality in Analamanga Region, in the Central Highlands of Madagascar. It belongs to the district of Anjozorobe and its populations numbers to 21,779 in 2018.

It is situated in a distance of 103 km from the countries capital Antananarivo of which only 25 km are a paved national road. The remaining 78 km are by a secondary unpaved road that renders access difficult in the rainy season. To the commune belong 11 fokontany (villages). It has been connected to electricity since 2019.

== History ==
Future queen Ranavalona I was born at a royal residence in Ambatomanoina in 1778.

== Economy ==
The economy is based on agriculture. Rice, corn, peanuts, beans, manioc, soya and onions are the main crops.

== Roads ==
The unpaved Provincial Road 19 links Ambatomanoina to Talata Volonondry (70 km).
