= Ankadikely Ilafy =

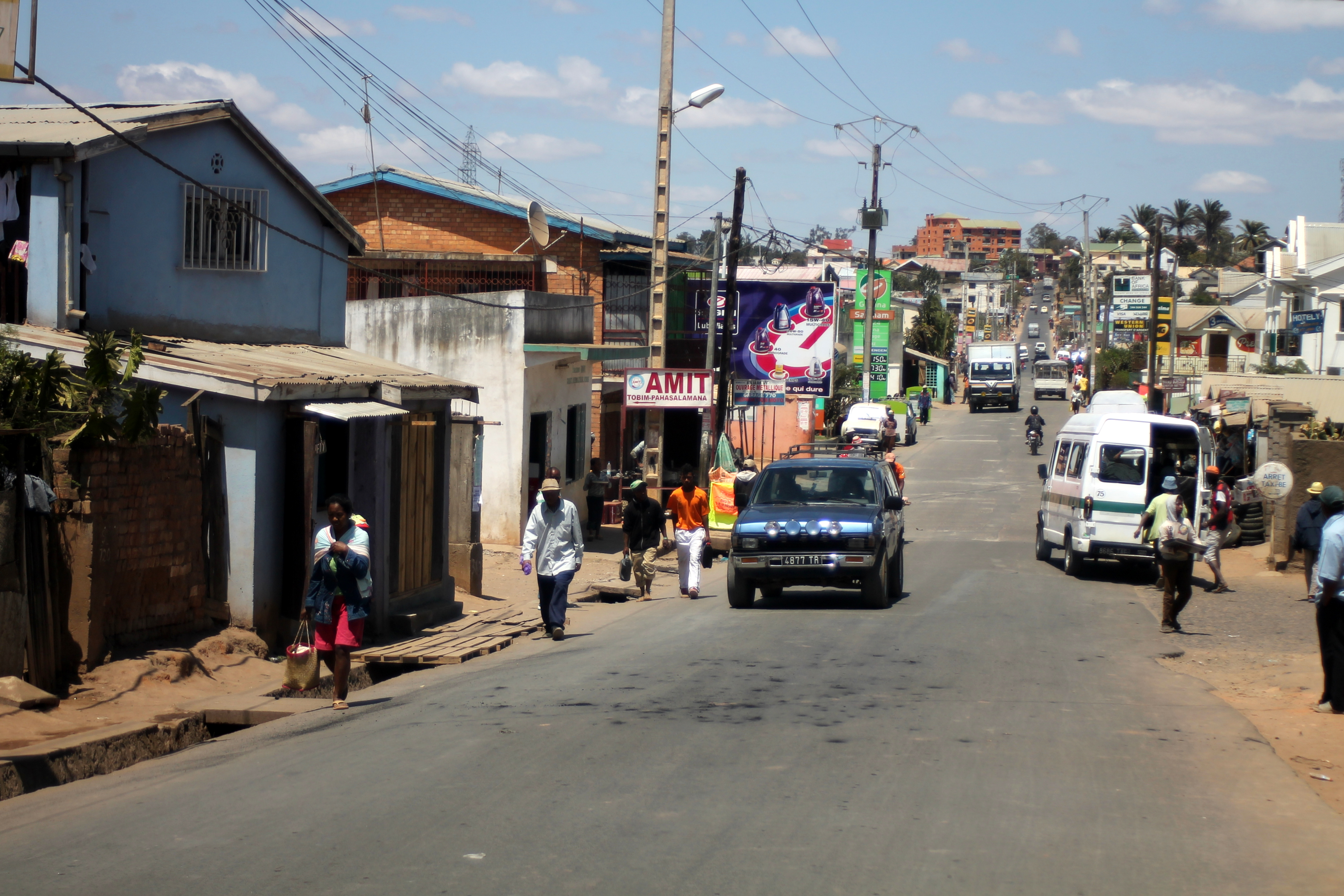
- Ankadikely Ilafy

- Location in Madagascar
- Coordinates: 18°51′S 47°33′E
- Country: Madagascar
- Region: Analamanga
- District: Antananarivo Avaradrano

Government
  - Mayor: Georges Andriamanganoro

Area
  - Total: 36.7 km^{2} (14.2 sq mi)
- Elevation: 1,277 m (4,190 ft)

Population (2018)
  - Total: 96,247
- Time zone: UTC3 (EAT)
- postal code: 103

Ankadikely Ilafy is a rural municipality in Analamanga Region, in the Central Highlands of Madagascar. It belongs to the district of Antananarivo Avaradrano. It is situated at 8 km North of Antananarivo at the National road 3 and its populations numbers to 96,247 in 2018.

The commune is divided in 18 fokontany (villages).

== Sights ==
- Rova d'Ilafy
