= Antsotso =

- Location in Madagascar
- Coordinates: 19°49′S 46°52′E
- Country: Madagascar
- Region: Vakinankaratra
- District: Betafo
- Elevation: 1,480 m (4,860 ft)

Population (2001)
  - Total: 15,000
  - Ethnicities: Merina
- Time zone: UTC3 (EAT)
- Postal code: 113

Antsotso or Antsoso is a rural municipality in Madagascar. It belongs to the district of Betafo, which is a part of Vakinankaratra Region. The population of the commune was estimated to be approximately 15,000 in 2001 commune census.

Only primary schooling is available. The majority 92% of the population of the commune are farmers, while an additional 8% receives their livelihood from raising livestock. The most important crop is rice, while other important products are maize, potatoes and soya.

== Geography ==
The town lies at the river Landratsay and north from Betafo.
