= Bary Jacobson Hoyme Ratsimbazafy =

Malagasy politician

General Bary Jacobson Hoyme Ratsimbazafy (born 9 March 1937, died 19 March 2021) was a Malagasy politician. A member of the National Assembly of Madagascar, he was elected as an independent in the 2007 Malagasy parliamentary elections. He represented the constituency of Manandriana.
