= Ambohimasina, Betafo =

Ambohimasina
- Location in Madagascar
- Coordinates: 19°39′S 46°44′E
- Country: Madagascar
- Region: Vakinankaratra
- District: Betafo
- Elevation: 1,421 m (4,662 ft)

Population (2018)
  - Total: 24,352
  - Ethnicities: Merina
- Time zone: UTC3 (EAT)

Ambohimasina is a town and commune in Madagascar. It belongs to the district of Betafo, which is a part of Vakinankaratra Region. The population of the commune was estimated to be approximately 24,352 in 2018.

Primary and junior level secondary education are available in town. The majority 85% of the population of the commune are farmers, while an additional 15% receives their livelihood from raising livestock. The most important crop is rice, while other important products are beans and maize.
