= Ambatonikonilahy =

- Location in Madagascar
- Coordinates: 19°43′S 46°56′E
- Country: Madagascar
- Region: Vakinankaratra
- District: Betafo
- Elevation: 2,024 m (6,640 ft)

Population (2018)
  - Total: 26,000
  - Ethnicities: Merina
- Time zone: UTC3 (EAT)
- Postal code: 113

Ambatonikonilahy is a rural municipality in Madagascar. It belongs to the district of Betafo, which is a part of Vakinankaratra Region. The population of this municipality was estimated to be approximately 26,000 in 2018.

Only primary schooling is available. The majority 85% of the population of the commune are farmers, while an additional 15% receives their livelihood from raising livestock. The most important crops are potatoes and fruits, while other important agricultural products are vegetables, maize and sweet potatoes.

== Geography ==
The municipality is situated at 14.5 km North of Betafo and 39 km from Antsirabe.

== Electricity ==
Ambatonikonilahy is presently not connected to an electric grid. 70% of its population gets light from petrol lamps and 10% from candles. The remaining 20% stay in the dark.
