= RIP19 (Madagascar) =

Road in Madagascar

Location
- Country: Madagascar

Highway system
- Roads in Madagascar

RIP 19 (route d’intérêt provincial 19) is an unpaved, secondary road in the region of Analamanga, Madagascar. It has a length of 70 kilometres (43 mi) and links Talata Volonondry to Ambatomanoina. Due to its bad state of conservation, 4 hours are needed for this distance.

== See also ==
- List of roads in Madagascar
- Transport in Madagascar
