= Antohobe =

- Location in Madagascar
- Coordinates: 19°46′S 46°11′E
- Country: Madagascar
- Region: Vakinankaratra
- District: Betafo
- Elevation: 676 m (2,218 ft)

Population (2018)
  - Total: 14,016
  - Ethnicities: Merina
- Time zone: UTC3 (EAT)
- Postal code: 113

Antohobe is a rural municipality in Madagascar. It belongs to the district of Betafo, which is a part of Vakinankaratra Region. The population of the commune was estimated to be approximately 14,016 in 2018.

Primary and junior level secondary education are available in town. The majority 98% of the population of the commune are farmers, while an additional 2% receives their livelihood from raising livestock. The most important crop is rice, while other important products are beans and cassava.

== Geography ==
The town lies at the river Landratsay and the National road 34 west from Betafo (25 km).
