= Androvakely =

- Location in Madagascar
- Coordinates: 18°42′S 47°29′E
- Country: Madagascar
- Region: Analamanga
- District: Anjozorobe (district)
- Established: 2015
- Elevation: 1,479 m (4,852 ft)

Population (2019)Census
  - Total: 11,489
- Time zone: UTC3 (EAT)
- Postal code: 105

Androvakely is a rural commune in Madagascar. It belongs to the district of Anjozorobe (district), which is a part of Analamanga Region. The population of the commune was estimated 11,489 in 2019.

It is situated in the north of the capital of Antananarivo.
