= Ambohibary Vohilena =

- Location in Madagascar
- Coordinates: 18°13′S 47°37′E
- Country: Madagascar
- Region: Analamanga
- District: Anjozorobe
- Elevation: 943 m (3,094 ft)

Population (2018)
  - Total: 27,651
- Time zone: UTC3 (EAT)

Ambohibary Vohilena is a rural commune in Analamanga Region, in the Central Highlands of Madagascar. It belongs to the district of Anjozorobe and its populations numbers to 27,651 in 2018.

== Economy ==
The economy is based on agriculture. Rice, corn, peanuts, beans, manioc, soya and onions are the main crops.
