= Driving in Madagascar =

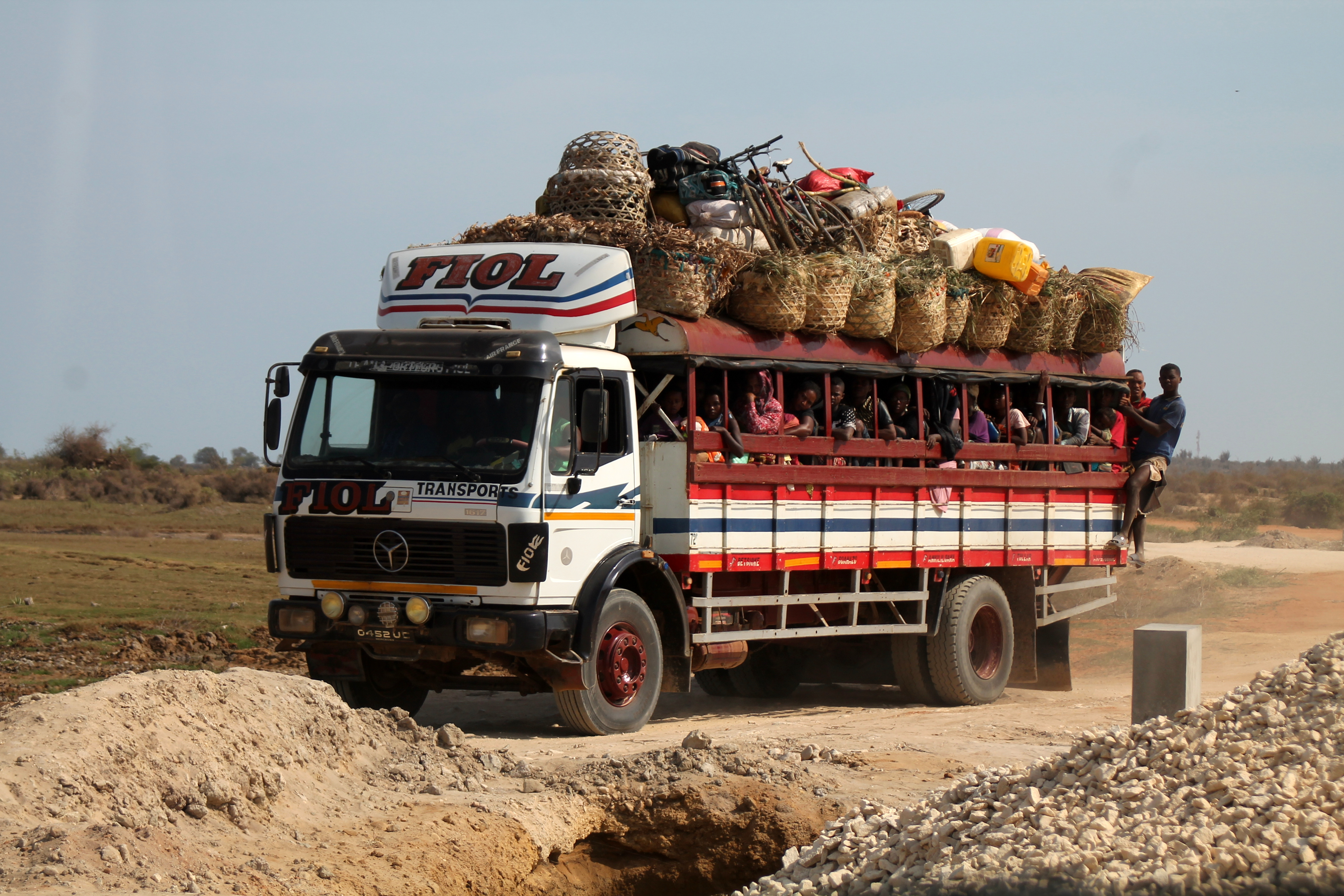
A truck on the Route nationale 9 carrying goods and passengers

The road network of Madagascar, comprising about 4,500 unique roads spanning 31,640 kilometers (19,660 mi), is designed primarily to facilitate transportation to and from Antananarivo, the Malagasy capital. Transportation on these roads, most of which are unpaved and two lanes wide, is often dangerous. Few Malagasy own private vehicles; long-distance travel is often accomplished in taxi brousses ('bush taxis'), (Note: Usually hyphenated in French, a spelling sometimes also used in English. French plural taxis-brousse or taxis brousse; English plural taxi brousses or taxis-brousses.) which may be shared by 20 or more people.

While most primary roads are in good condition, the World Food Programme has classified nearly two-thirds of the overall road network as being in poor condition. These conditions may make it dangerous to drive at moderate-to-high speeds and dahalo (bandit) attacks pose a threat at low speeds. Many roads are impassable during Madagascar's wet season; some bridges (often narrow, one-lane structures) are vulnerable to being swept away. Few rural Malagasy live near a road in good condition; poor road connectivity may pose challenges in health care, agriculture, and education.

Drivers in Madagascar travel on the right side of the road. On some roads, to deter attacks from dahalo, the government of Madagascar requires that drivers travel in convoys of at least ten vehicles. Car collision fatalities are not fully reported, but the rate is estimated to be among the highest in the world. Random police checkpoints, at which travelers are required to produce identity documents, are spread throughout the country. Crops are transported by ox cart locally and by truck inter-regionally. Human-powered vehicles, once the only means of road transport, are still found in the form of pousse-pousses (rickshaws). Taxi brousses constitute a rudimentary road-based public transportation system in Madagascar. Rides on taxi brousses cost as little as 200 Malagasy ariary (roughly US$0.10) as of 2005, and vehicles involved are often overpacked, sometimes with the assistant driver riding on the outside of the vehicle. Stops on their routes are generally not fixed, allowing passengers to exit at arbitrary points.

== History ==
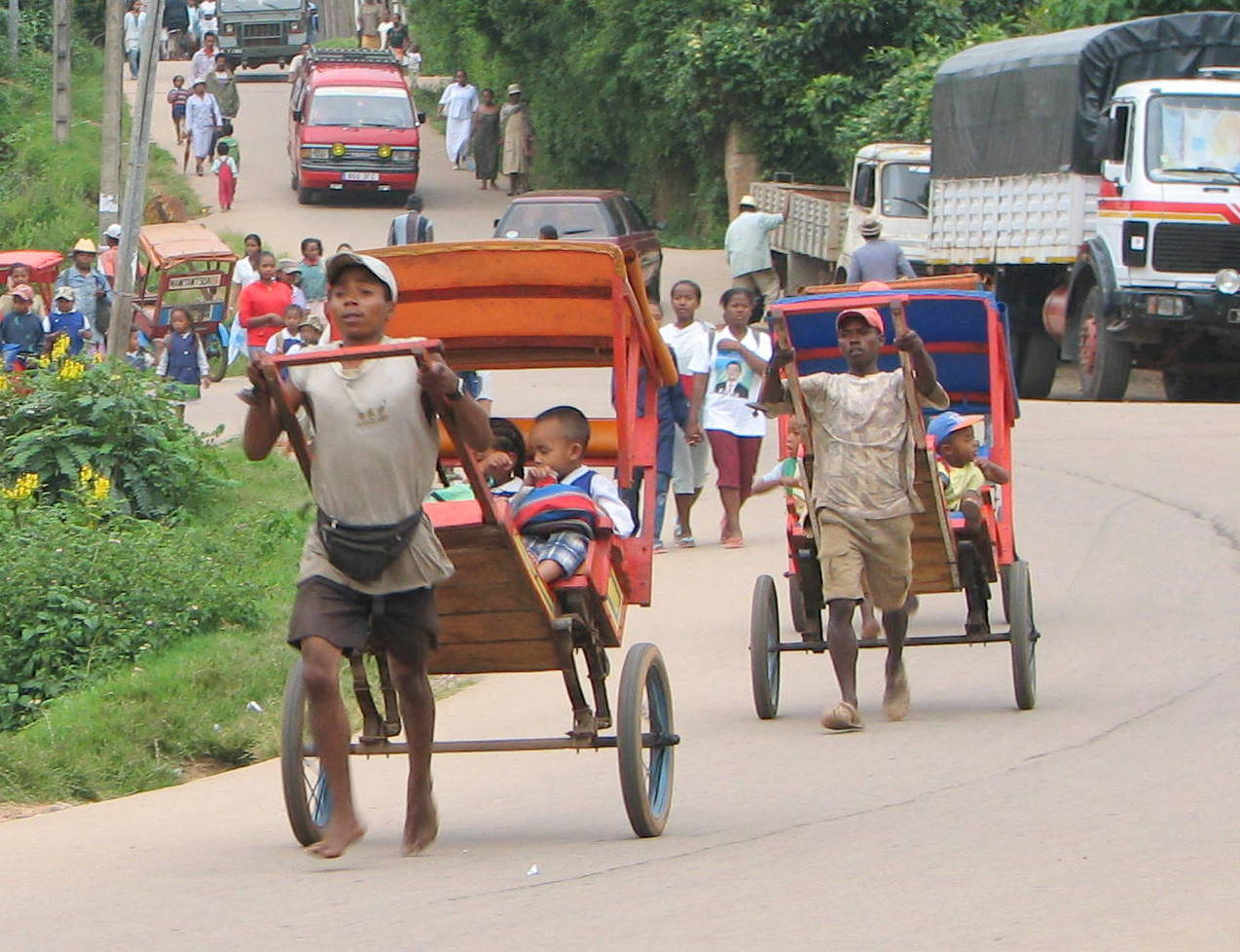
Pousse-pousses

There were no roads in Madagascar through the mid-19th century. Goods were carried across the island along pathways by porters, while oxen, the only beast of burden available, saw minimal use. After France conquered Madagascar in 1895, French colonial administrators, who did not understand the water and transportation system in place under the Merina Kingdom, immediately began building roads. Porters collectively resisted the creation of roads, continuing a pre-conquest movement in opposition to using horses which saw the stoning of European horse-riders in Antananarivo. In 1901, porters staged demonstrations against the introduction of pousse-pousses (rickshaws), but the latter prevailed when a road between Antananarivo and Toamasina was completed in 1902. Some human-powered vehicles remain in use as of 2017, in the form of pousse-pousses.

Even as late as 1955, passenger and commercial motor vehicles in Madagascar numbered under 30,000. In 1958, Madagascar's road network spanned about 25,100 kilometers (15,600 mi), almost all of it unpaved. In subsequent decades, the country relied heavily upon water and air travel for transportation, performing minimal investment and maintenance in its road infrastructure. Plantations, which were nationalized following a revolution in 1972, have exercised significant influence on road and infrastructure construction within the Sambirano, a river valley in the country's northeast, and maintained primary responsibility for road maintenance on some major thoroughfares there as of 1993.

== Roads ==
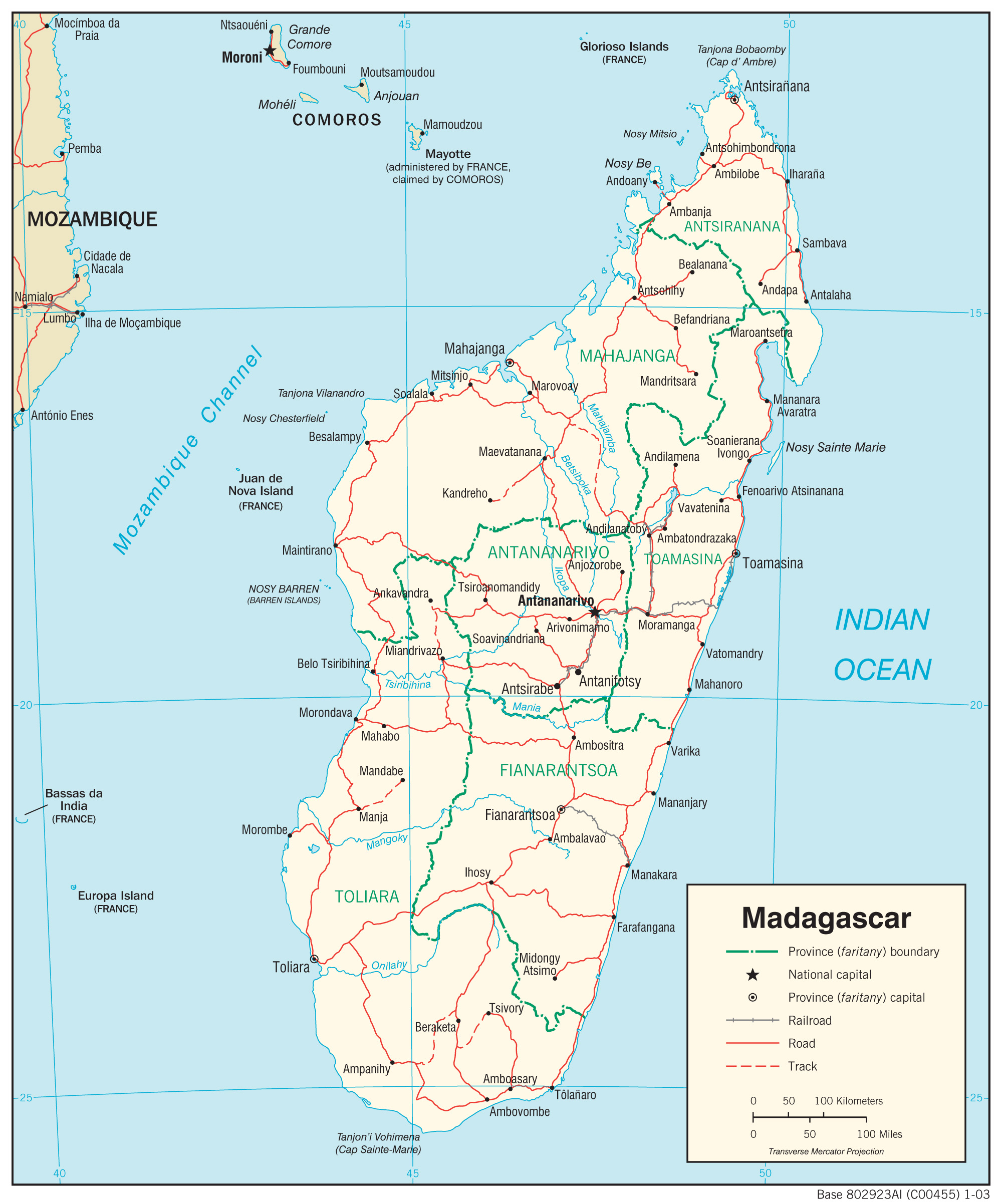
A road map of Madagascar, as of 2003

As of 2022, Madagascar contains over 4,500 unique roads. The road network spans approximately 31,640 kilometers (19,660 mi), representing 5.4 kilometers of road per 100 square kilometers of land (8.72 mi per 100 sq mi). This is a small road network, mostly oriented toward Antananarivo. Last-mile transport, particularly in rural areas, is sometimes accomplished via unofficial roads. Traffic drives on the right side of the road.

There are three classes of road systems in Madagascar: routes nationales ('national roads'), routes provinciales ('provincial roads'), and routes communales ('communal roads'). (Note: Also 'municipal roads'.) Routes nationales connect Antananarivo to Antsiranana, Toamasina, Morondava, and Toliara and make up 11,746 kilometers (7,299 mi) of the country's road network. Most roads of all three types have two lanes and are relatively narrow; many bridges have only one lane. The country's first toll highway, a 250-kilometer (160 mi) road designed to cut the travel time between Antananarivo to Toamasina from the current 10 hours down to a target of 2.5 hours, is under construction as of December 2022.

=== Road conditions ===
In 2018, the World Food Programme and the Global Logistics Cluster classified 64 percent of roads in Madagascar as in poor driving condition, 28 percent in average condition, and 10 percent in good condition; seven-in-ten of the primary roads fall into the latter-most category, which is defined as being navigable throughout all seasons of the year. The Statesman's Yearbook 2023 states that only about 22 percent of roads in Madagascar were paved as of 2013, while a 2019 World Bank report states that 81 percent were not paved. As natural gravel is not regularly available on the island of Madagascar, many roads are composed of sand lined with crushed stone. Many of these unsealed roads can only be used in the dry season. Roads in rural areas are often deficient in signage, while bridges are often swept away following rainstorms; during the wet season, road conditions degrade, particularly so in the country's North.

=== Connectivity challenges ===
As of 2019, only 11.4 percent of rural Malagasy live within 2 kilometers (1.2 mi) of a road in good condition, leaving 17 million without such access. Unsealed roads are the only way to access many parts of the country by road, including the key southern city of Fort-Dauphin. A 2018 World Bank report, conducted in partnership with the government of Madagascar, concluded that poor road connectivity was one of the major contributors for poor access to health care. The World Bank further linked poor connectivity to challenges in agriculture and education and identified climate change as having the potential to worsen the road connectivity situation.

== Means of transport ==
Vehicle ownership in Madagascar has grown from under 30,000 in 1955 to over 800,000 passenger and commercial vehicles in 2013, during which time the island country's population has risen from about 5 million to over 28 million. In reports in 2018 and 2019, the World Bank predicted an increase in car ownership as Madagascar's economy improved. A 2022 World Bank paper published in Public Transport found that 6 percent of Antananarivo households surveyed owned private cars, that private car ownership correlated with high income, and that car owners were less likely to use minibuses.

Vehicle ownership statistics
Year	Data	Source
1955	26,911 (≈ 5.3 per 1,000 people (Note: Inferred from population figure of about 5 million in same source, p. 47)), including 10,687 cars, 11,517 trucks, and 2,587 motorcycles	Geographical Review, 1958
c. 1975 (Note: "Latest available" data as of 1975 or 1976)	7 passenger cars and 6 commercial vehicles per 1,000 people	The Economist, 1978
1986	3.3 passenger cars (Note: Inferred from per-head figure of 0.0033) and 45 commercial vehicles per 1,000 people	Traffic Engineering and Control, 1986
2013	370,000 vans and trucks (13 per 1,000 people), 162,000 passenger vehicles (5.70), and 280,800 buses (9.877) (Note: Per-thousand statistics inferred from population figure of 28,430,000 in same source, p. 744)	The Statesman's Yearbook, 2023

=== Taxi brousses ===
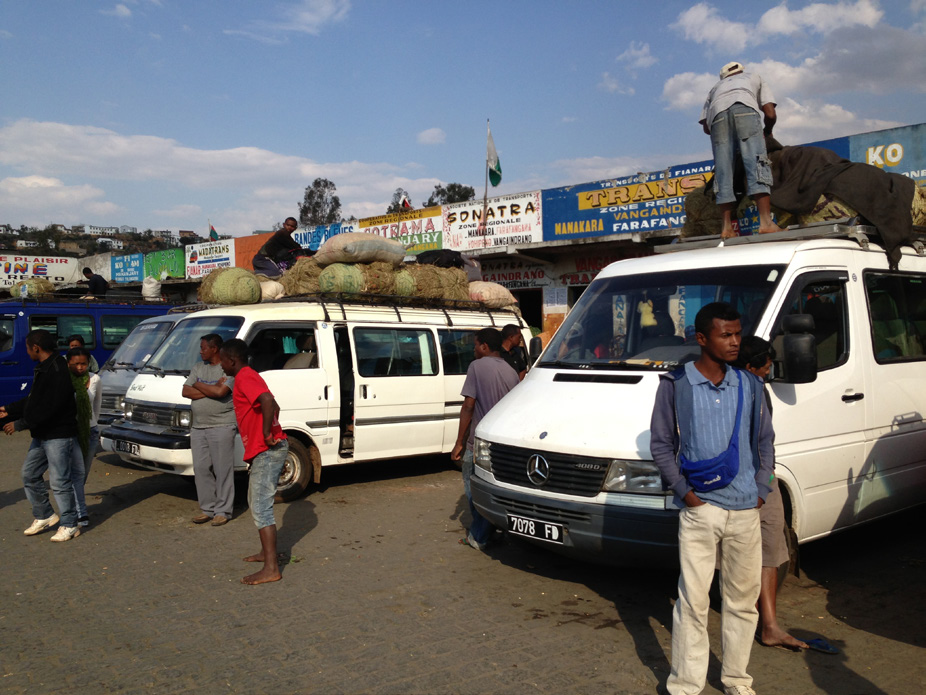
Four taxi brousses at a station in Ambositra

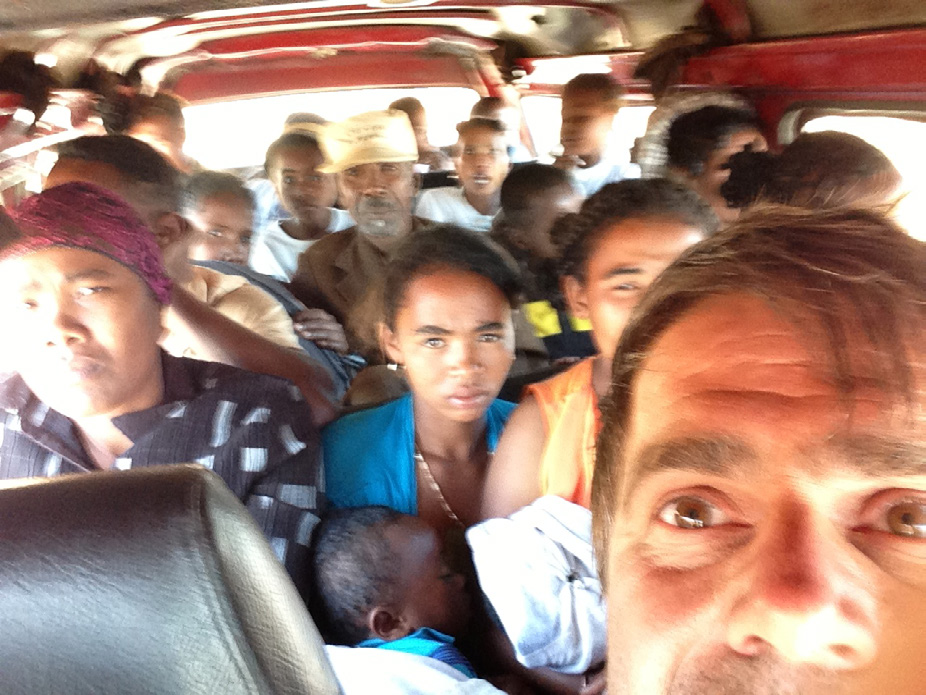
Interior of a crowded taxi brousse

Madagascar's taxi brousses ('bush taxis') are a type of share taxi that serve as a relatively affordable public transportation system amid Madagascar's poverty. The typical cost in 2005 was US$.10 per person, and most taxi brousses do not embark until all seats are full. While taxi brousses use fixed stops, passengers can also exit at any point along the route. Taxi brousse company fleets range in size from a single vehicle to over a hundred, and may serve one or more urban, regional, or national lines. National lines (Note: French: lignes nationales.) travel from their origin to their destination directly, disallowing improvised stops along the route. A vehicle is staffed by a driver and assistant driver, or two drivers on a very long route. Other people are employed to attract customers and fasten luggage to the vehicle's roof. According to a 2018 study in Media in Action, most taxi brousses used on paved roads are minibuses, while most on unpaved roads are trucks with benches in the cargo area. They often are filled above their intended capacities, sometimes close to double, with small children riding for free on their parents' laps. The researchers recount that the tight space can lead to conflict among passengers and requires people exiting to either jump out of a window or have everyone in front of them get out too. The assistant driver, who interacts with passengers and loads and unloads luggage, does not get a seat and either stands against the door or travels on the outside of the vehicle. Researchers observed that the drivers often appear to eat for free, as part of arrangements between the taxi brousse companies and restaurants they stop at. As of 2018, taxi brousse companies must register with the government and pay 2,400,000 Malagasy ariary (US$720) in fees and taxes per vehicle. Importation of vehicles is taxed at about ten times this amount.

=== Cargo transport ===
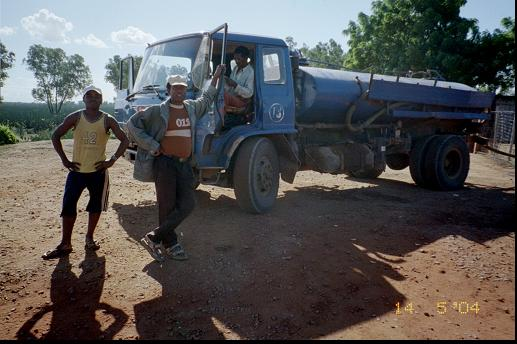
A water tanker at a filling station

Trans-regional transport of crops relies on trucks. In Vakinankaratra, a network of subcollectors buy crops from farmers in their villages and then sell the crops to wholesale collectors, who either have their own trucks or work with truckers they know. Because of the cost of operating a truck, most truckers own more than one truck so as to take advantage of economies of scale. As of 1997, most trucking in Vakinankaratra is conducted by ethnic Asians, who tend to be relatively well-off but, due to a history of ethnic tensions, are wary of assets that could easily be seized. A different class of transporters, the charretiers ('carters'), move crops to markets by ox cart.

Facing a water crisis in Southern Madagascar, in 1993 the national agency Alimentation en Eau dans le Sud (AES) (Note: 'Water supply in the South'.) engaged with the government of Japan to acquire 24 tanker trucks for water. As of 2004, 10 remain officially in service, although researcher Richard R. Marcus was only able to verify the existence of 6. According to Marcus, AES blamed tire issues, while locals alleged corruption.

== Safety ==
The maximum urban speed limit is 50 kilometers per hour (31 mph), or in some cases, 80 kilometers per hour (50 mph). As of 2018, there is no national speed limit in rural areas or on highways, though local governments have the ability to impose and modify speed limits within their jurisdictions. The Antananarivo–Toamasina toll highway, whose construction began in late 2022, will have a speed limit of 120 kilometers per hour (75 mph) across the entire highway. Volker Wulf et al. in Media in Action reported the speed limit for trucks is 45 kilometers per hour (28 mph); taxi brousses may go up to 75 kilometers per hour (47 mph) but in practice go around 40 kilometers per hour (25 mph). The blood alcohol content limit for drunk driving is 0.08 grams per deciliter. There is a seatbelt law but no child restraint law. Motorcyclists must wear helmets. Children are allowed as motorcycle passengers; children under five may not sit in the front seat of a car. Handheld phone use while driving is illegal. A 2018 World Health Organization (WHO) fact sheet said that hands-free use of a phone behind the wheel is legal, though a 2019 information sheet from the United States Bureau of Consular Affairs reported that hands-free use is illegal. Nighttime street lighting in the country is of limited availability.

The Intersectoral Committee for Road Safety and Ministry of Transport and Meteorology oversee road safety in Madagascar. While there are no official statistics on road safety in Madagascar, the country's Gendarmerie Nationale (Note: 'National gendarmerie'.) reported 340 people in 2016 who died within 24 hours of a car crash; the WHO estimated a true total of 7,108 car crash fatalities, or 28.6 per 100,000 inhabitants. In comparison, the global average is 18.2 and the African average is 26.6; Madagascar has the 24th-highest fatality rate out of 175 countries or regions assessed. About half of vehicle fatalities are pedestrians. According to the government of Canada, car collisions in Madagascar may instigate crowd violence. Car collisions in which a participant is injured or killed necessitate a court case, where the parties found liable for damages are required to cover all expenses related to the case; leaving Madagascar is prohibited prior to the completion of the case.

Dahalo (bandits) have attacked vehicles, leading the government to require that vehicles travel in convoys of at least 10 on many roads. Vehicles seek to travel at higher speeds, but become more vulnerable to attacks when forced by potholes to slow. Herds of zebu may also pose a hazard to driving. It is customary in Madagascar to blow one's car horn while traveling around road curves in order to notify other drivers of one's presence. Random vehicle checkpoints at which travelers are required to produce identity documents are spread throughout Madagascar.

== See also ==
- Muddling Through in Madagascar, a 1985 book by Irish author Dervla Murphy that details public transport and road conditions in Madagascar as they existed in the mid-1980s.
- Transport in Madagascar

== Notes ==
Madagascar French terms
