= Manohisoa =

- Location in Madagascar
- Coordinates: 19°47′S 46°46′E
- Country: Madagascar
- Region: Vakinankaratra
- District: Betafo
- Elevation: 1,642 m (5,387 ft)

Population (2018)
  - Total: 15,422
  - Ethnicities: Merina
- Time zone: UTC3 (EAT)
- Postal code: 113

Manohisoa is a town and commune in Madagascar. It belongs to the district of Betafo, which is a part of Vakinankaratra Region. The population of the commune was estimated to be approximately 15,422 in 2018.

Primary and junior level secondary education are available in town. The majority 98% of the population of the commune are farmers, while an additional 2% receives their livelihood from raising livestock. The most important crop is rice, while other important products are beans and cassava.
