= Ankadinandriana =

- Location in Madagascar
- Coordinates: 19°04′S 47°40′E
- Country: Madagascar
- Region: Analamanga
- District: Antananarivo Avaradrano

Area
  - Total: 107 km^{2} (41 sq mi)
- Elevation: 1,390 m (4,560 ft)

Population (2018)
  - Total: 14,684
- Time zone: UTC3 (EAT)
- postal code: 103

Ankadinandriana is a rural commune in Analamanga Region, in the Central Highlands of Madagascar. It belongs to the district of Antananarivo Avaradrano and its populations numbers to 14,684 in 2018.

The commune is composed by 17 Fokontany (villages): Ambohijato, Ambohimahatsinjo, Ambohitsaina, Ambohitromby, Ambohitsararay, Ampahitrosy, Andranomonina, Andranovelona, Andraravola, Andriampamaky, Ankadinandriana, Antanetibe, Antanimarina, Fihasinana, Miorikampoza, Morarano, and Soamonina.

== Economy ==
The economy of this commune is based on agriculture. Rice, corn, manioc, beans, potatoes and legumes are the main products. Horticulture is also an important sector of agriculture in the commune.
