= Inanantona =

- Location in Madagascar
- Coordinates: 19°39′S 46°37′E
- Country: Madagascar
- Region: Vakinankaratra
- District: Betafo
- Elevation: 1,276 m (4,186 ft)

Population (2001)
  - Total: 16,000
  - Ethnicities: Merina
- Time zone: UTC3 (EAT)

Inanantona or Inanantonana is a town and commune in Madagascar. It belongs to the district of Betafo, which is a part of Vakinankaratra Region. The population of the commune was estimated to be approximately 16,000 in 2001 commune census.

Only primary schooling is available. The majority 50% of the population of the commune are farmers, while an additional 50% receives their livelihood from raising livestock. The most important crops are rice and bambara groundnut, while other important agricultural products are peanuts, maize and cassava.
