= Antananarivo-Avaradrano District =

Antananarivo-Avaradrano
- District
- Location within Madagascar
- Country: Madagascar
- Region: Analamanga

Area
  - Total: 224.7 sq mi (581.9 km^{2})

Population (2020)
  - Total: 483,687
  - Density: 2,153/sq mi (831.2/km^{2})
- Postal code: 102

Antananarivo-Avaradrano is a district of Analamanga in Madagascar. The district of Avaradrano counts 16 communes and 213 fokontany (villages).

It covers the smaller communes in the outskirts of Antananarivo, the capital of Madagascar. The district has an area of 581.9 km^{2} (224.7 sq mi), and the estimated population in 2020 was 375,183.

== Communes ==
- Alasora
- Ambohidrabiby
- Ambohimalaza Miray
- Ambohimanambola
- Ambohimanga Rova
- Ambohimangakely
- Anjeva Gara
- Ankadikely Ilafy
- Ankadinandriana
- Anosy Avaratra
- Fieferana
- Manandriana
- Masindray
- Sabotsy Namehana
- Talata Volonondry
- Viliahazo
