= Andranomisa =

- Village
- Location within Madagascar
- Coordinates: 17°57′30″S 47°57′00″E
- Country: Madagascar
- Region: Analamanga
- District: Anjozorobe

Government
  - Mayor: Alijaona Rabekoto
- Elevation: 1,222 m (4,009 ft)

Population 2019
  - Total: 7,692
- Census
- Time zone: UTC+3 (EAT)
- postal code: 107

Andranomisa is a rural village in the Analamanga Region, Madagascar, in the district of Anjozorobe.

It has a population of 7,692 inhabitants in 2019.
