= Andrembesoa =

Town in Vakinankaratra, Madagascar

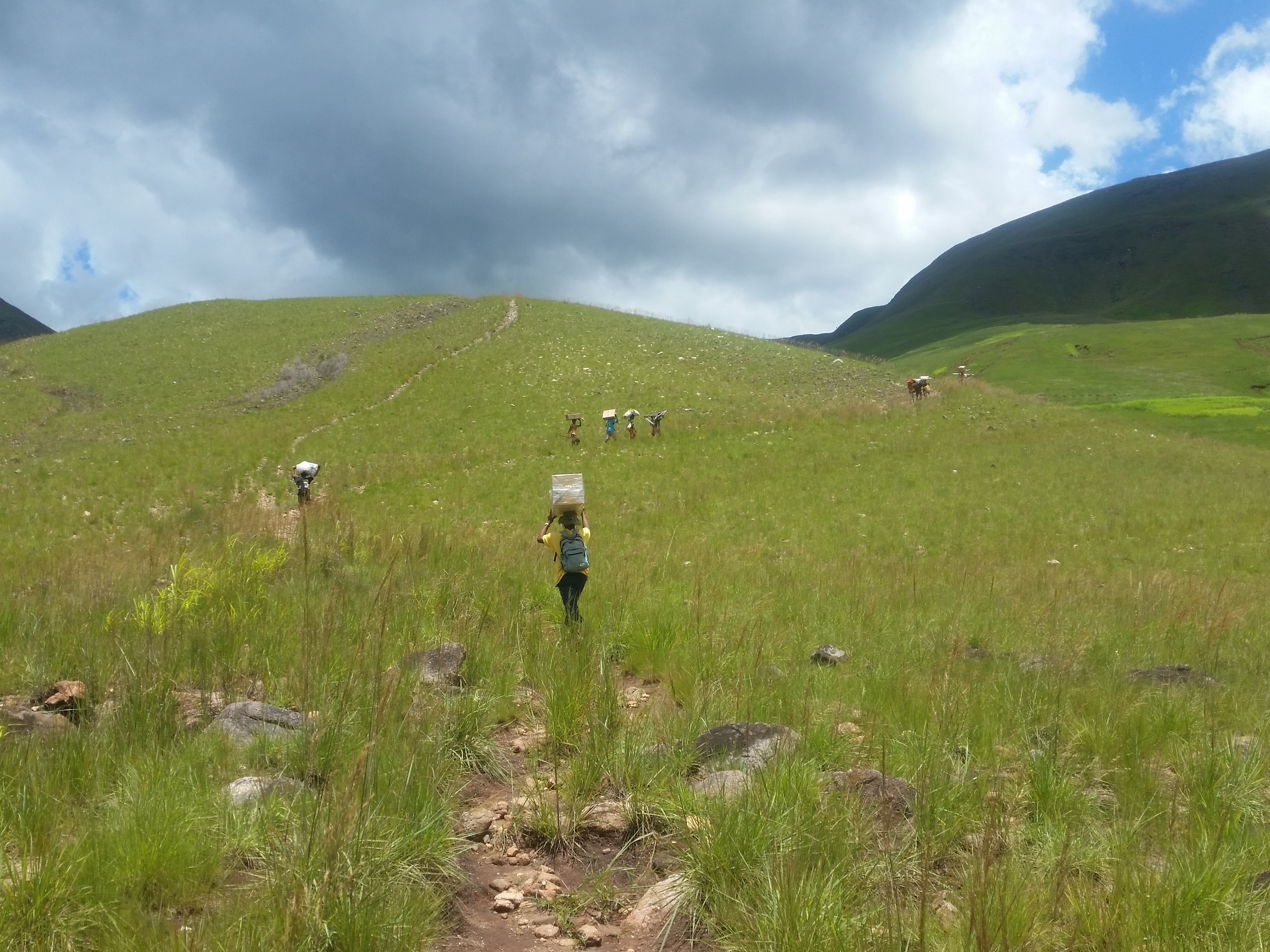
- landscape near Andrembesoa

- Location in Madagascar
- Coordinates: 20°9′S 46°39′E
- Country: Madagascar
- Region: Vakinankaratra
- District: Betafo
- Elevation: 1,216 m (3,990 ft)

Population (2001)
  - Total: 12,000
  - Ethnicities: Merina
- Time zone: UTC3 (EAT)

Andrembesoa is a town and commune in Madagascar. It belongs to the district of Betafo, which is a part of Vakinankaratra Region. The population of the commune was estimated to be approximately 12,000 in 2001 commune census.

Only primary schooling is available. The majority 98.5% of the population of the commune are farmers, while an additional 0.5% receive their livelihood from raising livestock. The most important crops are rice and maize, while other important agricultural products are peanuts and cassava. Industry provides employment for 1% of the population.
