= Betatao =

- Location in Madagascar
- Coordinates: 18°12′S 47°53′E
- Country: Madagascar
- Region: Analamanga
- District: Anjozorobe
- Elevation: 1,280 m (4,200 ft)

Population (2018)
  - Total: 13,112
- Time zone: UTC3 (EAT)
- postal code: 107

Betatao is a rural commune in Analamanga Region, in the Central Highlands of Madagascar. It belongs to the district of Anjozorobe and its populations numbers to 13,112 in 2018.

== Economy ==
The economy is based on agriculture. Rice, corn, peanuts, beans, manioc, soya and onions are the main crops.
