= Tritriva =

- Location in Madagascar
- Coordinates: 19°55′S 46°56′E
- Country: Madagascar
- Region: Vakinankaratra
- District: Betafo
- Elevation: 1,692 m (5,551 ft)

Population (2018)
  - Total: 9,536
- Time zone: UTC3 (EAT)
- Postal code: 113

Tritriva is a rural municipality in Madagascar. It belongs to the district of Betafo, which is a part of Vakinankaratra Region. The population of the commune was estimated to be approximately 9,536 in 2018.

Only primary schooling is available. The majority 90% of the population of the commune are farmers, while an additional 10% receives their livelihood from raising livestock. The most important crop is potatoes, while other important products are maize, barley, rice and soya.

== See also ==
- Lake Tritriva
