= Antanetibe Anativolo =

Rural commune in Analamanga, Madagascar

- Rural settlement
- Location in Madagascar
- Coordinates: 18°24′S 47°33′E
- Country: Madagascar
- Region: Analamanga
- District: Anjozorobe
- Elevation: 980 m (3,220 ft)

Population (2018)
  - Total: 20,257
- Time zone: UTC+03:00 (EAT)
- postal code: 106

Antanetibe Anativolo is a rural commune in Analamanga Region, in the Central Highlands of Madagascar. It belongs to the district of Anjozorobe. The population was 20,257 in 2018.

Eleven fokontany (villages) belong to the commune.

== Economy ==
The economy is based on agriculture. Rice, corn, peanuts, beans, manioc, soya and onions are the main crops.
