= Ambongamarina =

- Commune
- Location within Madagascar
- Coordinates: 18°19′30″S 47°57′15″E
- Country: Madagascar
- Region: Analamanga
- District: Anjozorobe

Government
  - Mayor: Teloson Randriamaharisoa
- Elevation: 1,350 m (4,430 ft)

Population 2018
  - Total: 15,382
- Time zone: UTC+3 (EAT)
- postal code: 107

Ambongamarina is a rural municipality in the Analamanga Region, Madagascar, 110 km north-east of the capital Antananarivo, in the district of Anjozorobe. It has a population of 15,382 inhabitants in 2018. It's principally inhabited by Merina and Sihanaka people.

The commune has no road access and 5 hours of hike is necessary to reach it.

== Economy ==
The economy is based on agriculture. Rice, corn, peanuts, beans, manioc, soya and onions are the main crops. Another important crop is Tsiperifery, a wild pepper species.
