= Ambohidrabiby =

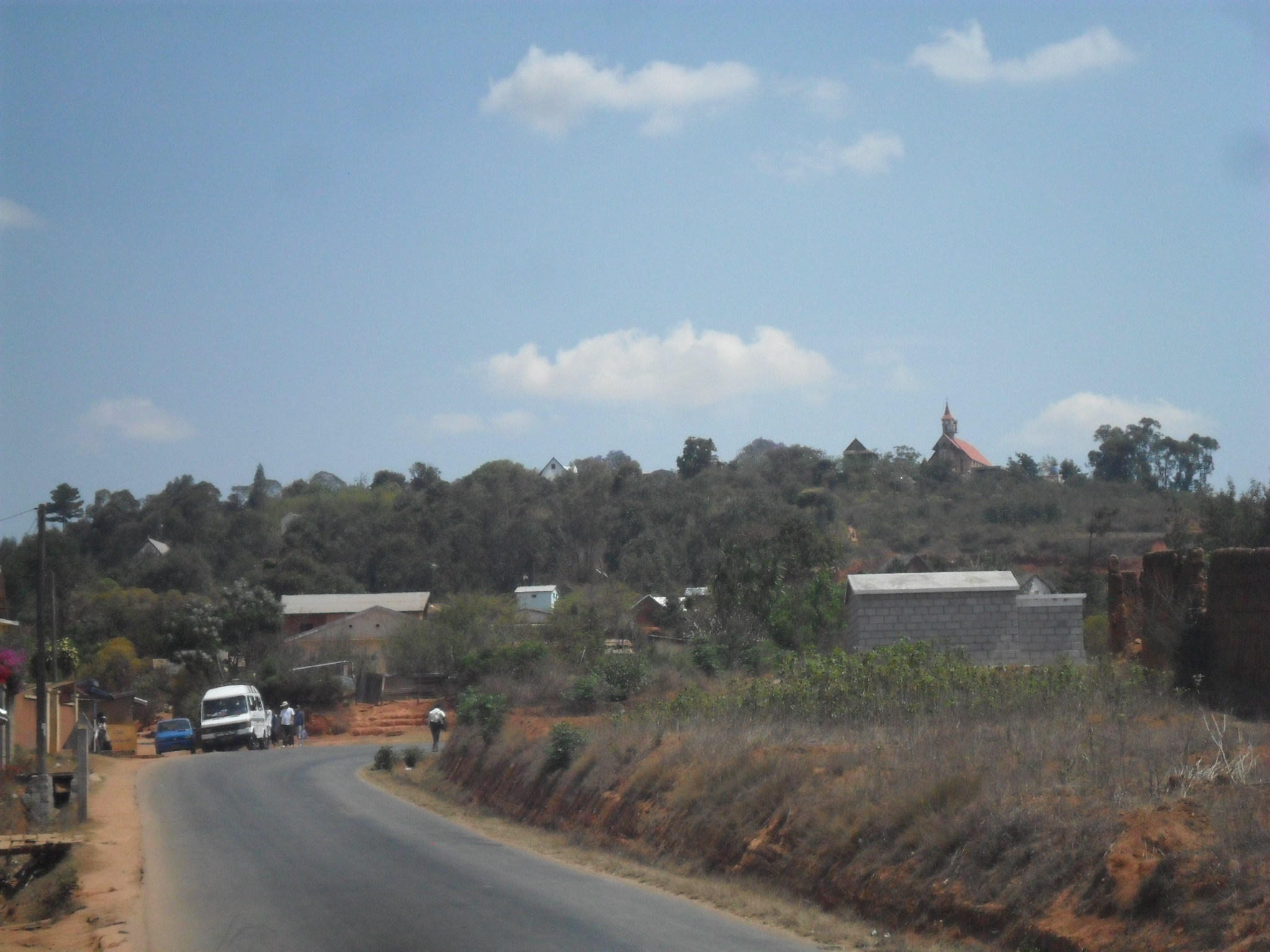
- Ambohidrabiby

- Location in Madagascar
- Coordinates: 18°01′S 47°45′E
- Country: Madagascar
- Region: Analamanga
- District: Antananarivo Avaradrano

Government
  - Mayor: Barisoa Davida Andriamananjara

Area
  - Total: 30 km^{2} (12 sq mi)

Population (2019)
  - Total: 7,873
- Time zone: UTC3 (EAT)
- postal code: 103

Ambohidrabiby is a rural municipality in Analamanga Region, in the Central Highlands of Madagascar. It belongs to the district of Antananarivo Avaradrano.

It is 20 km from the capital Antananarivo on the National road 3. One of the 12 sacred of the Hill of Ambohidrabiby of the Imerina is situated in this municipality.

11 Fokontany (villages) are part of this municipality: Ambatomitsangana, Ambohitrantenaina, Ambodiala, Ambohibao, Ambohidrabiby, Ampahidralambo, Ampanataovana, Antanambao, Fonohasina, Kelifaritra and Tsarahonenana.
