= Ambohimangakely =

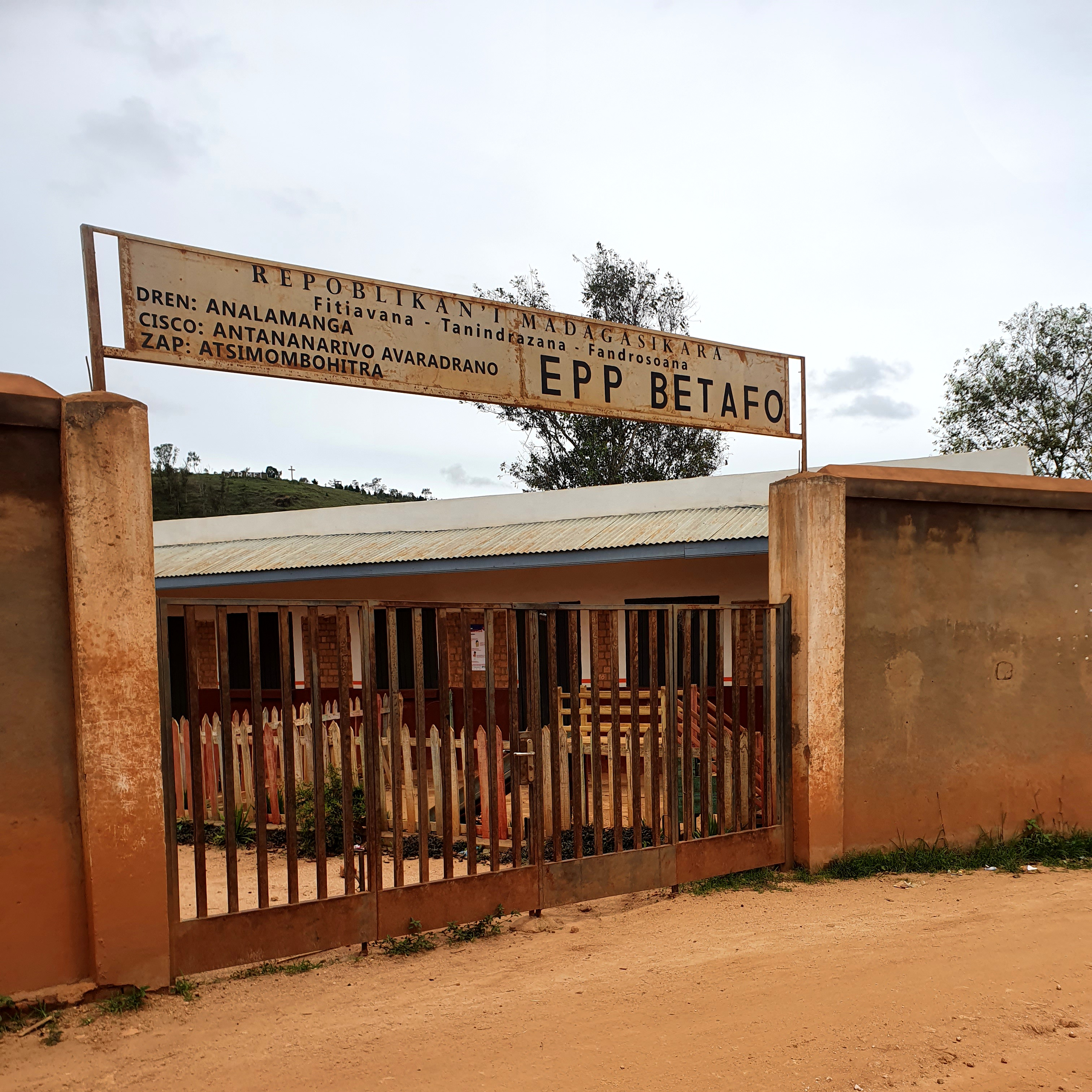
- a school in Betafo, Ambohimangakely

- Location in Madagascar
- Coordinates: 18°55′S 47°36′E
- Country: Madagascar
- Region: Analamanga
- District: Antananarivo Avaradrano

Government
  - Mayor: Thierry Radafindranaro
- Elevation: 1,255 m (4,117 ft)

Population (2018)
  - Total: 91,056
- Time zone: UTC3 (EAT)
- postal code: 103
- Website: commune-ambohimangakely.mg

Ambohimangakely is a rural municipality in Analamanga Region, in the Central Highlands of Madagascar. It is situated at 12 km East of Antananarivo on the National road 2 and belongs to the district of Antananarivo Avaradrano. Its populations numbers to 91,056 in 2018.

== Celebrities ==
- Hasina Malalaharison, vice-world champion 2017 Pétanque
