= Alarobia Bemaha =

- Location in Madagascar
- Coordinates: 20°12′S 46°53′E
- Country: Madagascar
- Region: Vakinankaratra
- District: Betafo
- Elevation: 1,195 m (3,921 ft)

Population (2001)
  - Total: 15,000
  - Ethnicities: Merina
- Time zone: UTC3 (EAT)

Alarobia Bemaha is a town and commune in Madagascar. It belongs to the district of Betafo, which is a part of Vakinankaratra region. The population of the commune was estimated to be approximately 15,000 in 2001 commune census.

Only primary schooling is available. The majority 85% of the population of the commune are farmers, while an additional 15% receives their livelihood from raising livestock. The most important crops are maize and ginger, while other important agricultural products are beans and rice.
