= Anosiarivo Manapa =

- Location in Madagascar
- Coordinates: 19°55′S 47°02′E
- Country: Madagascar
- Region: Vakinankaratra
- District: Betafo

Area
  - Total: 529.39 km^{2} (204.40 sq mi)
- Elevation: 1,450 m (4,760 ft)

Population (2018)
  - Total: 17,423
  - Ethnicities: Merina
- Time zone: UTC3 (EAT)
- Postal code: 113

Anosiarivo Manapa is a town and commune in Madagascar. It belongs to the district of Betafo, which is a part of Vakinankaratra Region. The population of the commune was estimated to be approximately 17,423 in 2018.

Primary and junior level secondary education are available in town. The majority 98% of the population of the commune are farmers, while an additional 2% receives their livelihood from raising livestock. The most important crop is rice, while other important products are beans and cassava.

7 fokontany (villages) are part of the commune: Soafierenana, Anosiarivo-Ambatofotsy, Ambohimandroso, Antsetsindrano, Bemasoandro, Antanimenana and Anosiarivo Manapa.

== Ethnics ==
The commune is principally inhabited by Merina (75%) and Betsileo (25%).
