= Alakamisy, Antananarivo =

Alakamisy
- Location in Madagascar
- Coordinates: 18°56′0″S 47°25′0″E
- Country: Madagascar
- Region: Analamanga
- District: Anjozorobe

Population (2018)
  - Total: 4,234
- Postal code: 107

Alakamisy is a rurale commune in central Madagascar. It is situated in the Region Analamanga, in the Anjozorobe district. It has a population of in 4,234 in 2018.

Nearby villages include Tsarasaotra, Anjozorobe (2.1 miles), Ambohitratampona (1.0 nm), Antranomay (2.2 nm), Mandotohana (4.8 nm), Analalava, Anjozorobe (1.4 nm), Ankaifotsy (1.4 nm) and Vodivato (3.0 nm).

== Rivers ==
The commune is crossed by the Mananara river (Nord) and is bordered in its East by the Sokafana.
