= Ambohimanarina Marovazaha =

- Town
- Location within Madagascar
- Coordinates: 18°14′00″S 47°46′00″E
- Country: Madagascar
- Region: Analamanga
- District: Anjozorobe
- Elevation: 1,106 m (3,629 ft)

Population 2019
  - Total: 7,537
- Census
- Time zone: UTC+3 (EAT)
- postal code: 107

Ambohimanarina Marovazaha is a rural village in the Analamanga Region, Madagascar, in the district of Anjozorobe.

It has a population of 7,537 inhabitants in 2019.
