= Masindray =

- Location in Madagascar
- Coordinates: 18°56′S 47°17′E
- Country: Madagascar
- Region: Analamanga
- District: Antananarivo Avaradrano

Area
  - Total: 76 km^{2} (29 sq mi)
- Elevation: 1,328 m (4,357 ft)

Population (2018)
  - Total: 13,505
- Time zone: UTC3 (EAT)
- postal code: 103

Masindray is a rural commune in Analamanga Region, in the Central Highlands of Madagascar. It belongs to the district of Antananarivo Avaradrano and its populations numbers to 13,505 in 2018. It is situated at 20 km West from Antananarivo.

== Roads ==
The town is crossed by the paved road RIP5.

== Economy ==
The economy is based on agriculture. Rice, corn, peanuts, beans, manioc, soya and onions are the main crops.
