= Fieferana =

- Location in Madagascar
- Coordinates: 18°50′S 47°38′E
- Country: Madagascar
- Region: Analamanga
- District: Antananarivo Avaradrano
- Elevation: 1,390 m (4,560 ft)

Population (2018)
  - Total: 7,068
- Time zone: UTC3 (EAT)
- postal code: 103

Fieferana is a rural municipality in Analamanga Region, in the Central Highlands of Madagascar. It belongs to the district of Antananarivo Avaradrano and its populations numbers to 7,068 in 2018. It is located at a distance of 23 km North-East from Antananarivo.

== Economy ==
The economy of this municipality is based on agriculture. Rice, corn, manioc, beans, potatoes and vegetables are the main products.

== Notable personalities ==
The tomb of Jean-Joseph Rabearivelo is found in Fieferana.
