= Marotsipoy =

- Village
- Location within Madagascar
- Coordinates: 18°027′30″S 47°35′53″E
- Country: Madagascar
- Region: Analamanga
- District: Anjozorobe
- Elevation: 1,405 m (4,610 ft)

Population 2019
  - Total: 6,056
- Census
- Time zone: UTC+3 (EAT)
- postal code: 107

Marotsipoy is a rural village in the Analamanga Region, Madagascar, in the district of Anjozorobe.

It has a population of 6,056 inhabitants in 2019.
