= Viliahazo =

- Location in Madagascar
- Coordinates: 18°49′S 47°40′E
- Country: Madagascar
- Region: Analamanga
- District: Antananarivo Avaradrano
- Elevation: 1,493 m (4,898 ft)

Population (2019)
  - Total: 2,513
- Time zone: UTC3 (EAT)
- postal code: 103

Viliahazo is a rural municipality in Analamanga Region, in the Central Highlands of Madagascar. It belongs to the district of Antananarivo Avaradrano, 20 km north of the capital Antananarivo and its population numbers to 2,513 in 2019.

== Economy ==
The economy is based on substantial agriculture. Rice, corn, peanuts, beans, manioc are the main crops.
