= Manandriana =

Manandriana Manandriana Avaradrano
- Location in Madagascar
- Coordinates: 18°46′S 47°30′E
- Country: Madagascar
- Region: Analamanga
- District: Antananarivo Avaradrano
- Established: October 2015

Government
  - Mayor: Joseph Razafitsalama
- Elevation: 1,340 m (4,400 ft)

Population (2019)
  - Total: 6,506
- Time zone: UTC3 (EAT)
- postal code: 103

Manandriana, also called Manandriana Avaradrano, is a rural municipality in Analamanga region, in the Central Highlands of Madagascar. It belongs to the district of Antananarivo-Avaradrano and its population numbers to 6,506 in 2019.

The economy is based on substantial agriculture. Rice, maize, peanuts, beans, manioc are the main crops.

== Geography ==
It is situated on the paved provincial road RIP 58A (Madagascar) to Sabotsy Namehana (5km) and the capital Antananarivo.
