= Belanitra =

- Location in Madagascar
- Country: Madagascar
- Region: Analamanga
- District: Anjozorobe (district)
- Established: 2015

Population (2019)Census
  - Total: 2,911
- Time zone: UTC3 (EAT)
- Postal code: 105

Belanitra is a rural commune in Madagascar. It belongs to the district of Anjozorobe (district), which is a part of Analamanga Region. The population of the commune was estimated 2,911 in 2019.

It is situated in the north of the capital of Antananarivo.
