= Ambohimalaza Miray =

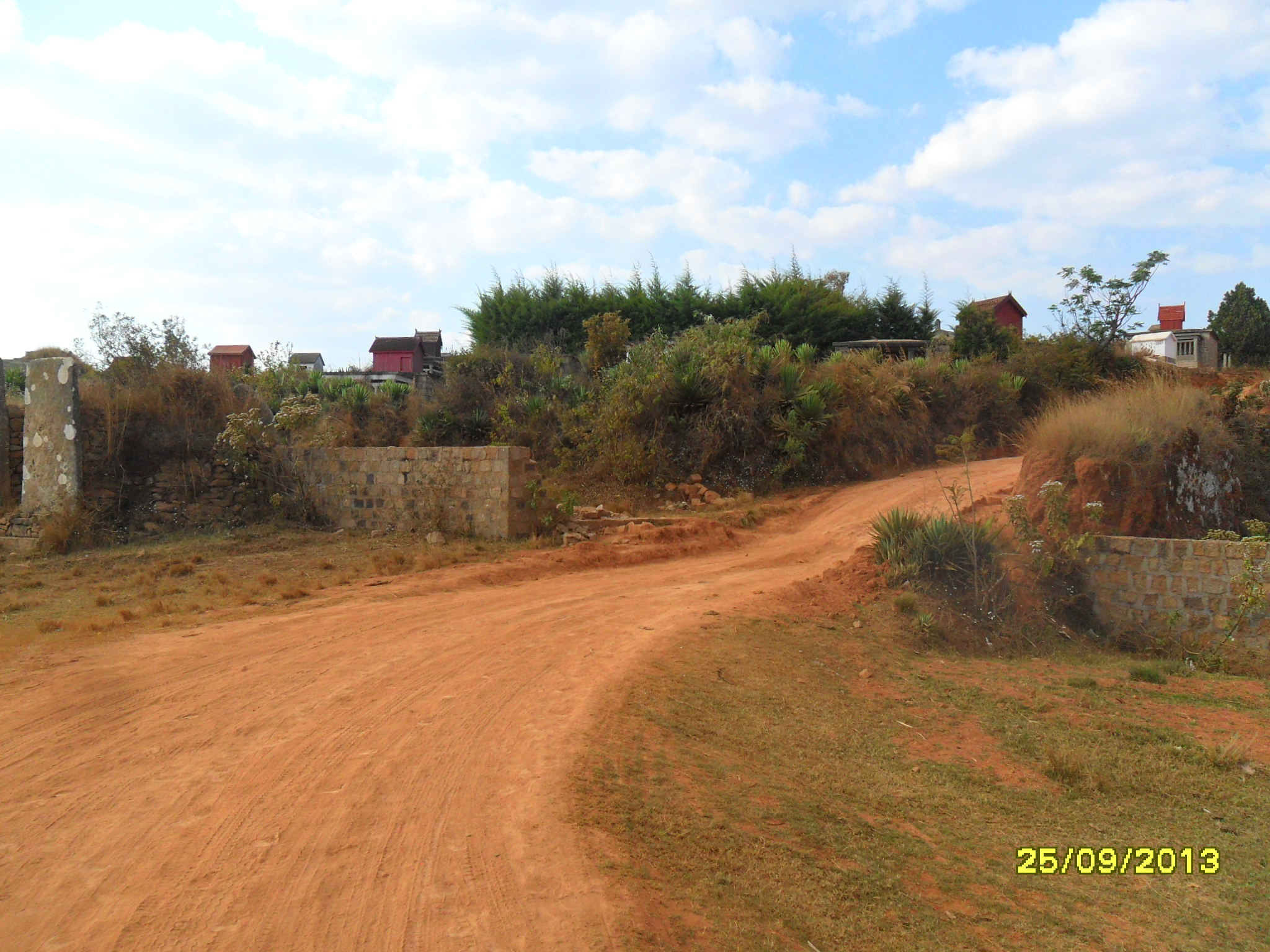
- Southern entrance of Ambohimalaza Miray

- Location in Madagascar
- Coordinates: 18°55′S 47°39′E
- Country: Madagascar
- Region: Analamanga
- District: Antananarivo Avaradrano

Area
  - Total: 33 km^{2} (13 sq mi)
- Elevation: 1,349 m (4,426 ft)

Population (2018)
  - Total: 15,988
  - Ethnicities: Merina
- Time zone: UTC3 (EAT)
- postal code: 103

Ambohimalaza Miray is a rural municipality in Analamanga Region, in the Central Highlands of Madagascar. It belongs to the district of Antananarivo Avaradrano and its population numbers to 15,988 in 2018.

It is located at 18 km East of Antananarivo along the National Road 2.

12 Fokontany (villages) belong to the municipality: Ambohimalaza Miray, Ambatofotsy, Fiadanana, Ambohitrandriana, Mahia, Masombahiny, Andranosoa, Ambatomalaza, Antentona, Ambohitremo, Atsimon’ Ambohidray and Andranonomby. 8 of these fokontany are connected to electricity.

== Economy ==
The economy is based on agriculture. Rice, corn, peanuts, beans, manioc are the main crops.

== Rivers ==
The Ampasimbe river crosses this municipality from North to South.

== Schools ==
There are 23 schools: 14 primary schools and 9 secondary schools.
