= Betafo District =

Coordinates: 19.84°S 46.855°E

Betafo
- District
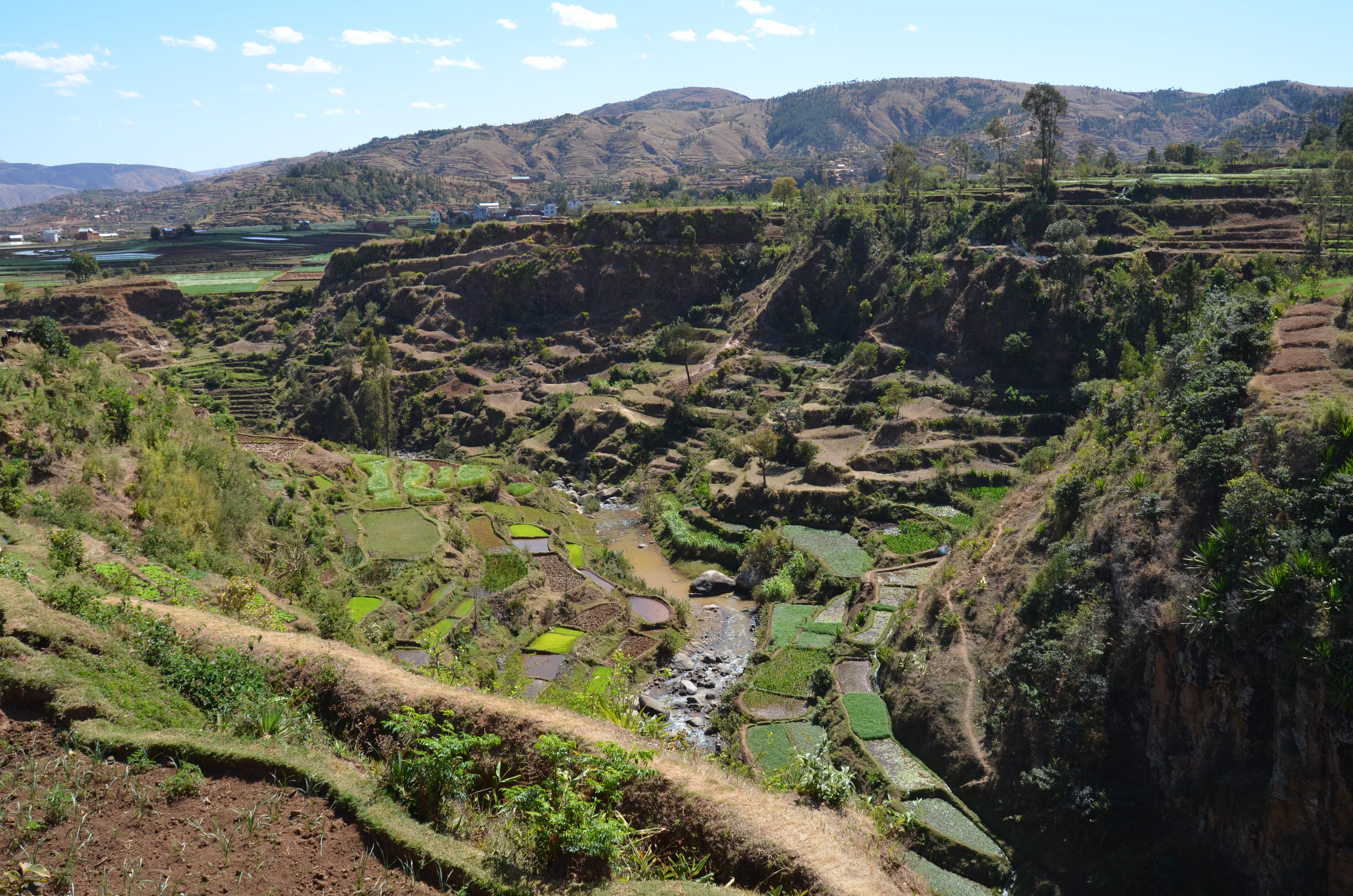
- Rice fields near Betafo

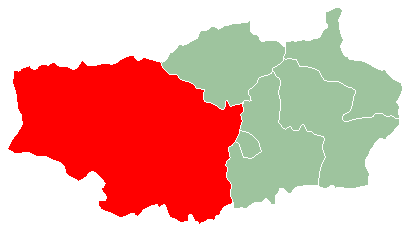
- Location of the district within the region of Vakinankaratra.
- Country: Madagascar
- Region: Vakinankaratra
- Administrative centre: Betafo

Area
  - Total: 4,607 km^{2} (1,779 sq mi)

Population (2018)
  - Total: 331,696
  - Density: 72.00/km^{2} (186.5/sq mi)
- Postal code: 113

Betafo is a district in Vakinankaratra Region, Madagascar. The administrative centre of the district is the town of Betafo. However the district has subsequently been divided by the creation of the new Mandoto District from former parts of Betafo District. The reduced district covers an area of 4,607 km^{2}, and it had an estimated population of 331,696 in 2018. It is situated at 22 km west of Antsirabe.

The irrigated rice paddies of the district are emblematic of this technology throughout the highlands and were nominated to the Tentative List of UNESCO World Heritage Sites in Madagascar in 1997.

== Communes ==
The district is further divided into 18 communes:

- Alakamisy Anativato
- Alakamisy Marososona
- Alarobia Bemaha
- Ambatonikonilahy
- Ambohimanambola
- Ambohimasina
- Andranomafana
- Andrembesoa
- Anosiarivo Manapa
- Antohobe
- Antsoso
- Betafo
- Inanantonana
- Mahaiza
- Mandritsara
- Manohisoa
- Soavina Soavina, Betafo
- Tritriva

== Infrastructure ==
The district is connected by the RN34 national road from Antsirabe (22km) to Morondava.

== Lakes ==
- The Lake Tritriva, a volcanic lake.
