= Ambohimanga Rova =

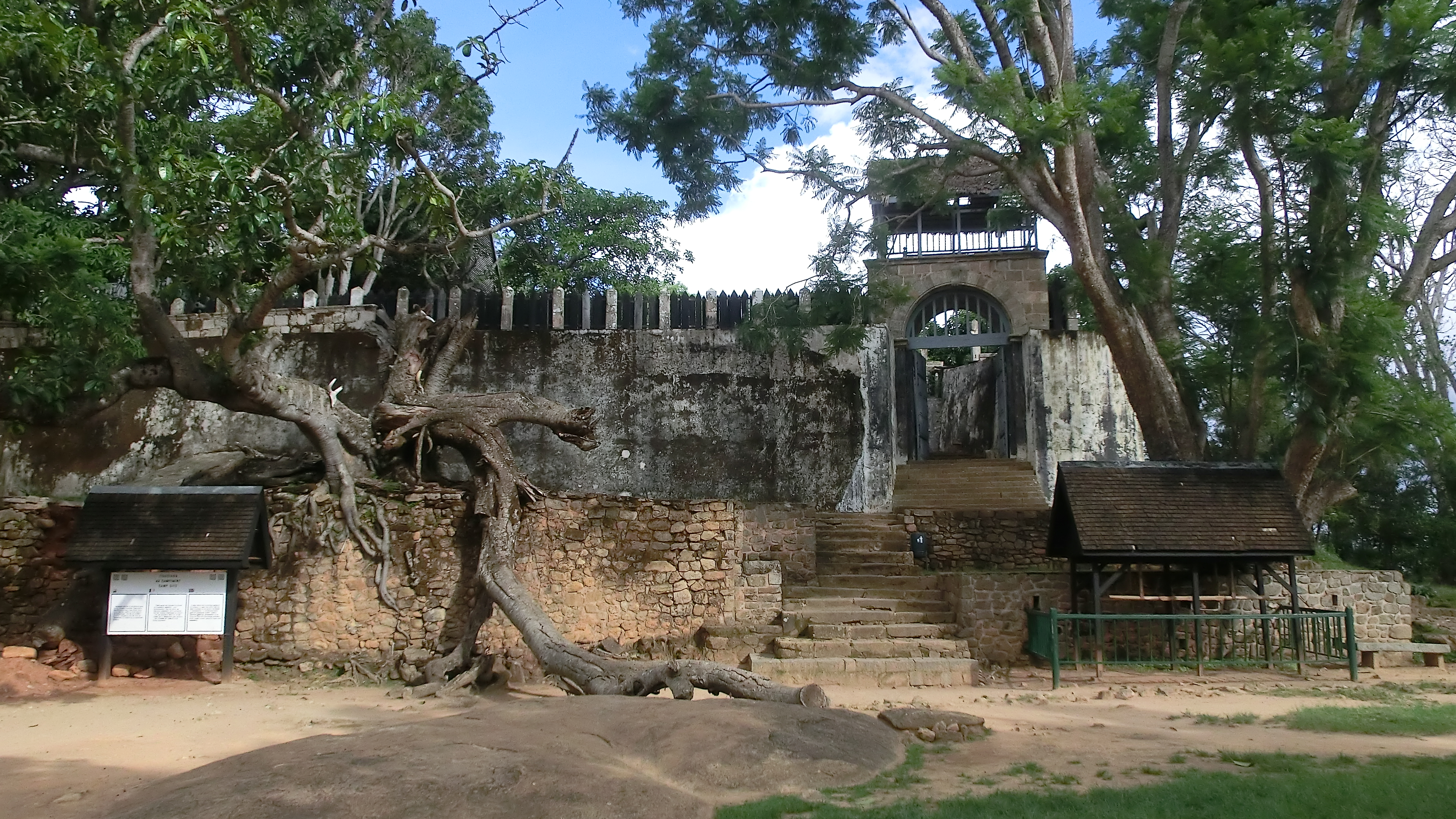
- Royal hill (Rova) of Ambohimanga

- Location in Madagascar
- Coordinates: 18°46′S 47°34′E
- Country: Madagascar
- Region: Analamanga
- District: Antananarivo Avaradrano

Government
  - Mayor: Robert Rakotonindrina
- Elevation: 1,328 m (4,357 ft)

Population (2018)
  - Total: 20,872
- Time zone: UTC3 (EAT)
- postal code: 103

Ambohimanga Rova is a rural commune in Analamanga Region, in the Central Highlands of Madagascar. It belongs to the district of Antananarivo Avaradrano and its populations numbers to 20,872 in 2018.

It is situated at 27 km North-West from Antananarivo.

== Roads ==
The town is crossed by the National Road 51.

== Economy ==
The economy is based on agriculture. Rice, corn, peanuts, beans, manioc, soya and onions are the main crops. Another important factor is tourism. The royal hill of Ambohimanga is situated in this commune and is a popular point of interest.
