= Ambohimanambola =

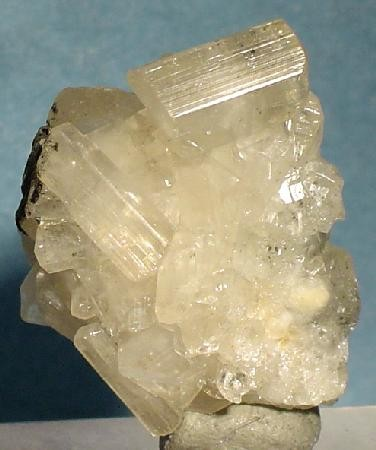
- Crystal from Ambohimanambola

- Location in Madagascar
- Coordinates: 18°57′S 47°36′E
- Country: Madagascar
- Region: Analamanga
- District: Antananarivo Avaradrano

Government
  - Mayor: Donat Ramilijaona
- Elevation: 1,255 m (4,117 ft)

Population (2018)
  - Total: 16,418
- Time zone: UTC3 (EAT)
- postal code: 103

Ambohimanambola is a rural municipality in Analamanga Region, in the Central Highlands of Madagascar. It belongs to the district of Antananarivo Avaradrano and had a population of 16,418 in 2018.

== Power stations ==
At 14km from Ambohimanambola is situated the Antelomita Hydroelectric Power Station. Another themal power station with a capacity of 105 kw is presently being built in Ambohimanambola.
