= Alakamisy Anativato =

Alakamisy Antivato
- Location in Madagascar
- Coordinates: 19°53′S 46°54′E
- Country: Madagascar
- Region: Vakinankaratra
- District: Betafo

Area
  - Land: 17.6 km^{2} (6.8 sq mi)
- Elevation: 1,542 m (5,059 ft)

Population (2018)
  - Total: 10,754
  - Ethnicities: Merina
- Time zone: UTC3 (EAT)
- Postal code: 113
- Climate: Cwb

Alakamisy Anativato is a rural municipality in Madagascar. It belongs to the district of Betafo, which is a part of Vakinankaratra region. It is situated in a distance of 127 km South-West of Antananarivo and 21 km West of Antsirabe. The population of the commune was 10754 in 2018.

In its North it can be accessed by the national road 34 from Antsirabe.

To the commune belong 8 fokontany (villages): Alakamisy, Ambalakatra, Ampamelomana, Antovontany, Iakarina, Imanja, Soamanandrariny and Soavina–Belanitra

Primary and junior level secondary education are available in town. The majority 90% of the population of the commune are farmers, while an additional 10% receives their livelihood from raising livestock. The most important crops are rice and potatoes, while other important agricultural products are maize, barley and soya.

== Fokontany ==
8 fokontany (villages) belong to this municipality:

- Alakamisy Anativato (3 km²),
- Ambalakatra (2 km²)
- Ampamelomana (3 km²)
- Iakarina (2 km²)
- Imanja (2,10 km²)
- Antovontany Anjanamasy (2 km²)
- Soamanadrariny (1,50 km²)
- Soavina Belanitra (2 km²)

Total: 17,60 km²
