= Fenoarivo =

Fenoarivo may refer to:

- Fenoarivo, Ambalavao, a town and commune in Haute Matsiatra Region, Madagascar
- Fenoarivo, Ambatofinandrahana, a town and commune in Amoron'i Mania Region, Madagascar
- Fenoarivo, Antananarivo, a suburb and rural commune in Analamanga Region, Madagascar
- Fenoarivo, Farafangana, a town and commune in Atsimo-Atsinanana Region, Madagascar
