= Analaroa =

- Town
- Location within Madagascar
- Coordinates: 18°24′30″S 47°42′30″E
- Country: Madagascar
- Region: Analamanga
- District: Anjozorobe
- Elevation: 1,235 m (4,052 ft)

Population 2018
  - Total: 9,282
- Time zone: UTC+3 (EAT)
- postal code: 105

Analaroa is a large town in the Analamanga Region, Madagascar, 80 km north-east of the capital Antananarivo, in the district of Anjozorobe.

It has a population of 9,282 inhabitants in 2018.
