= Alakamisy Marososona =

- Location in Madagascar
- Coordinates: 19°43′S 46°45′E
- Country: Madagascar
- Region: Vakinankaratra
- District: Betafo
- Elevation: 1,287 m (4,222 ft)

Population (2018)
  - Total: 13,966
  - Ethnicities: Merina
- Time zone: UTC3 (EAT)
- Postal code: 113
- Climate: Cwb

Alakamisy Marososona is a town and commune in Madagascar. It belongs to the district of Betafo, which is a part of Vakinankaratra region. The population of the commune was estimated 13,966 in 2018.

Primary and junior level secondary education are available in town. The majority 90% of the population of the commune are farmers, while an additional 10% receives their livelihood from raising livestock. The most important crops are rice and potatoes, while other important agricultural products are maize, barley and soya.
