= Talata Volonondry =

Talata Volonondry Talatavolonondry
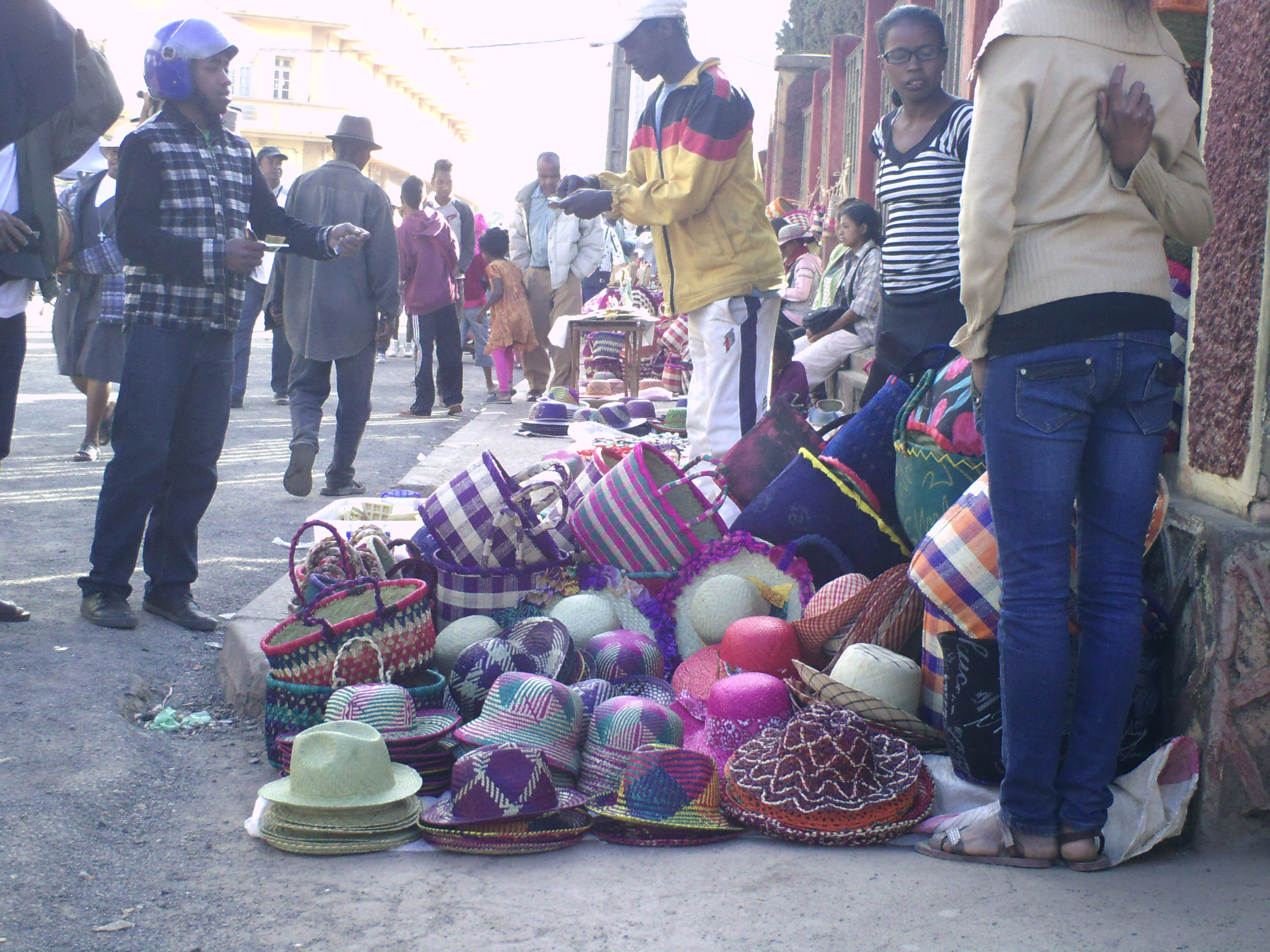
- in the market of Talata Volonondry
- Nickname: Koba
- Motto(s): This commune is planted cassava, potatoes,
- Location in Madagascar
- Coordinates: 18°45′S 47°39′E
- Country: Madagascar
- Region: Analamanga
- District: Antananarivo Avaradrano

Area
  - Total: 110 km^{2} (42 sq mi)
- Elevation: 1,444 m (4,738 ft)

Population (2018)
  - Total: 18,314
  - Density: 185/km^{2} (480/sq mi)
- Time zone: UTC3 (EAT)
- postal code: 103

Talata Volonondry (or Talatavolonondry) is a rural commune in Analamanga Region, in the Central Highlands of Madagascar. It belongs to the district of Antananarivo Avaradrano and its population numbers to 18,314 in 2018.

It is situated at 27 km north of Antananarivo on the National Road 3 to Anjozorobe.

== Economy ==
The economy of this commune is based on agriculture. Rice, corn, manioc, beans, potatoes and legumes are the main products. The commune is composed by 28 fokontany (villages) of which more than half has no access to drinking water and electricity.

== Telecommunications ==
A shortwave transmitter site has been located in the commune since the 1970s. Established by RNW, since 2013 MGLOB SA has aired contract programming from Rádio Dabanga, NHK World Japan, Deutsche Welle, Vatican Radio, Adventist World Radio, and the BBC World Service.
