= Ambohidratrimo =

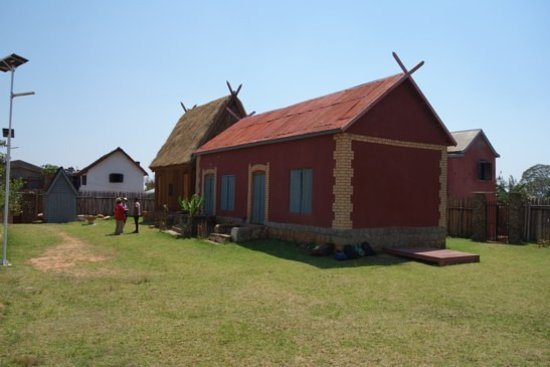
- Rova of Ambohidratrimo

- Location in Madagascar
- Coordinates: 18°49′S 47°26′E
- Country: Madagascar
- Region: Analamanga
- District: Ambohidratrimo
- Elevation: 1,352 m (4,436 ft)
- Time zone: UTC3 (EAT)

Ambohidratrimo is a municipality in Analamanga Region, in the Central Highlands of Madagascar, located at 15 km from the capital of Antananarivo.

There are found the Twelve sacred hills of Imerina.

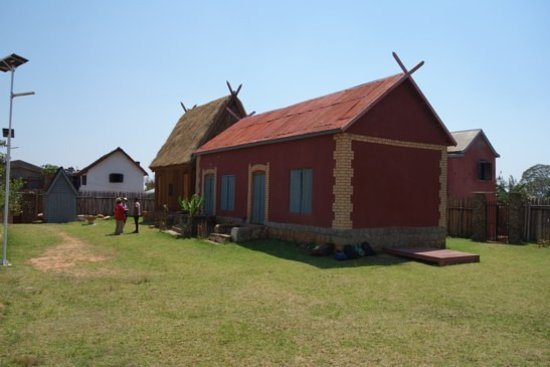
Rova Ambohidratrimo
