= Tsarasaotra, Anjozorobe =

Tsarasaotra
- Location in Madagascar
- Coordinates: 18°33′S 47°54′E
- Country: Madagascar
- Region: Analamanga
- District: Anjozorobe

Population (2019)Census
  - Total: 4,084
- Time zone: UTC3 (EAT)
- postal code: 107

Tsarasaotra is a rural commune in Analamanga Region, in the Central Highlands of Madagascar. It belongs to the district of Anjozorobe and its populations numbers to 4,084 in 2018.

== Rivers ==
The commune is crossed by the Mananara river (Nord).

== Economy ==
The economy is based on agriculture. Rice, corn, peanuts, beans, manioc, soya and onions are the main crops.
