= Alasora =

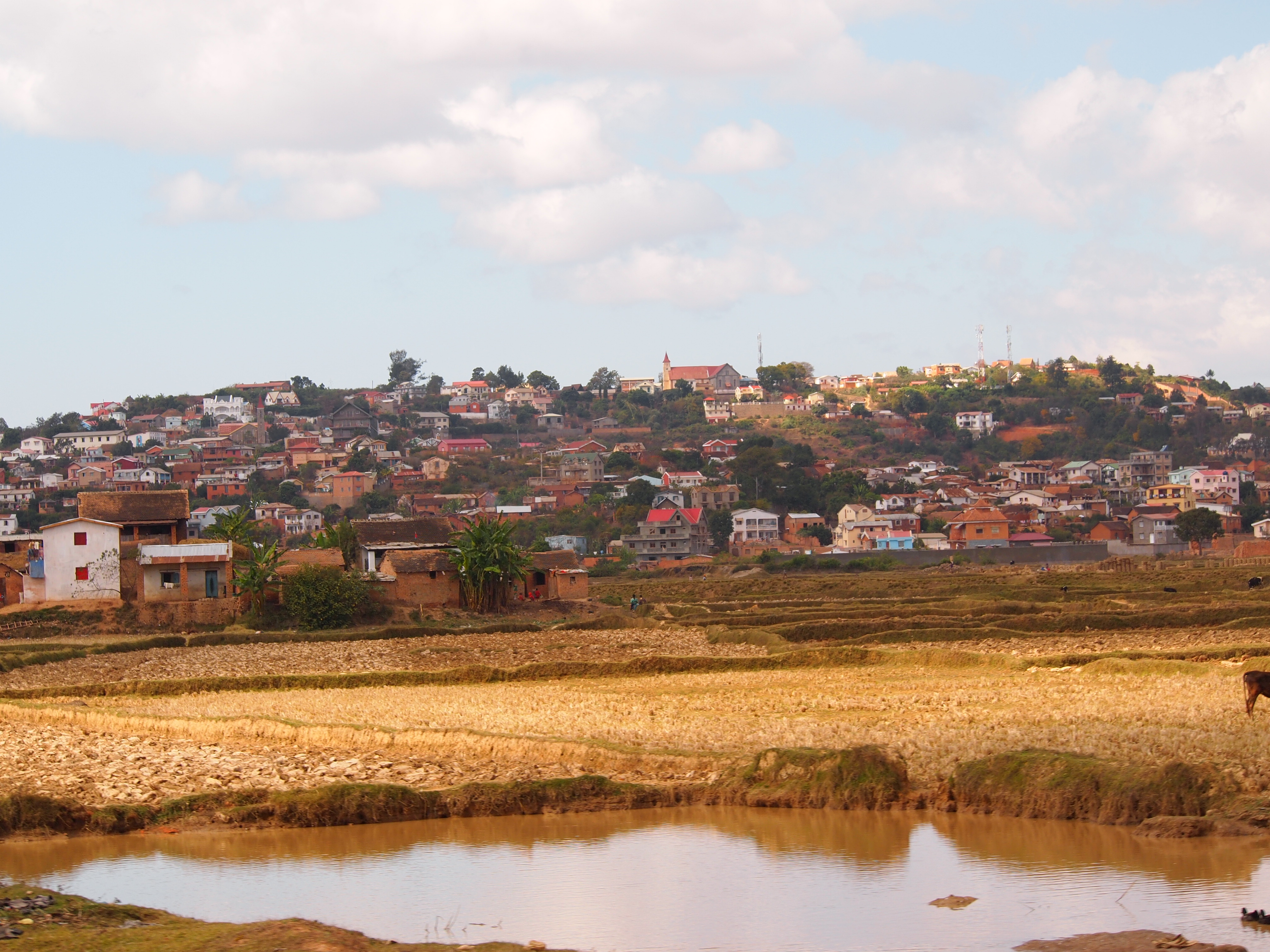
- Hill of Alasora

- Location in Madagascar
- Coordinates: 19°07′S 47°47′E
- Country: Madagascar
- Region: Analamanga
- District: Antananarivo Avaradrano

Area
  - Total: 44 km^{2} (17 sq mi)

Population (2019)
  - Total: 57.650
- Time zone: UTC3 (EAT)
- postal code: 103

Alasora is a rural commune in Analamanga Region, in the Central Highlands of Madagascar. It belongs to the district of Antananarivo Avaradrano.

It is located in the east of Antananarivo. The sacred Hill of Alasora is situated in this municipality.

== Economy ==
Most important economic factor is agriculture. Alasora is also known to be a place where pottery and earthenware is made.
