= Sabotsy Namehana =

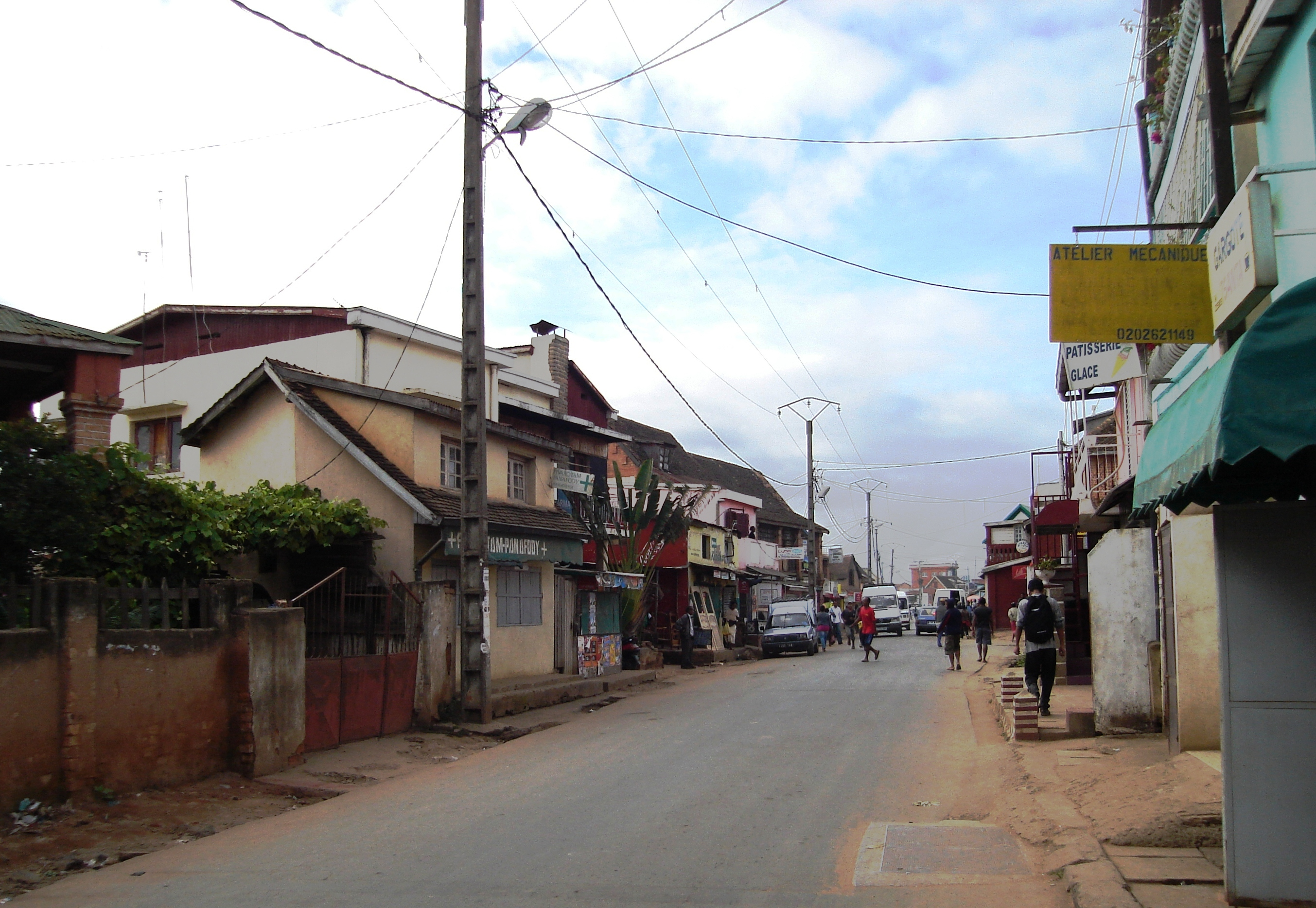
- Main road Sabotsy Namehana

- Location in Madagascar
- Coordinates: 18°50′S 47°33′E
- Country: Madagascar
- Region: Analamanga
- District: Antananarivo Avaradrano

Government
  - Mayor: Mary Thomasson Andriamosa Avotraina

Area
  - Land: 17 km^{2} (6.6 sq mi)
- Elevation: 1,349 m (4,426 ft)

Population (2018)
  - Total: 57,363
- Time zone: UTC3 (EAT)
- postal code: 103

Sabotsy Namehana is a rural municipality in Analamanga Region, in the Central Highlands of Madagascar. It belongs to the district of Antananarivo Avaradrano and its populations numbers to 57,363 in 2018.

It is located along the National Road 3, 10 km North of Antananarivo.

== Economy ==
The economy is based on agriculture. Rice, corn, peanuts, beans, manioc are the main crops.

== Personalities ==
- Hery Rajaonarimampianina (* 1958), politician
