= Route nationale 3 (Madagascar) =

Road in Madagascar

Location
- Country: Madagascar

Highway system
- Roads in Madagascar

Route nationale 3 (RN 3) is a highway of 91 km in Madagascar, running from Antananarivo to Talata Volonondry, Anjozorobe and the Lake Alaotra. It crosses the region of Analamanga and Alaotra-Mangoro.

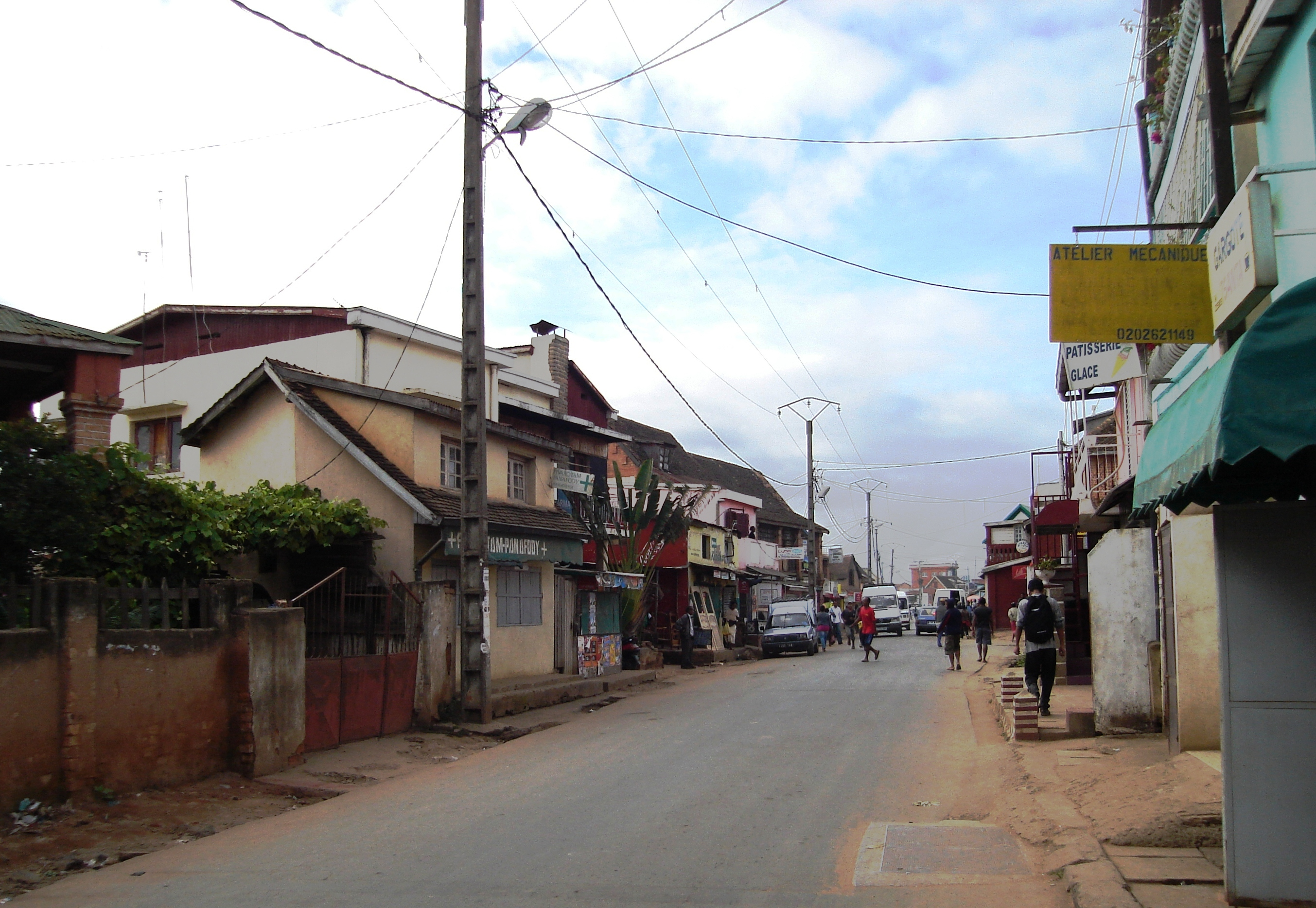
RN3 at Sabotsy Namehana

== See also ==
- List of roads in Madagascar
- Transport in Madagascar
