= Anjozorobe =

- Town
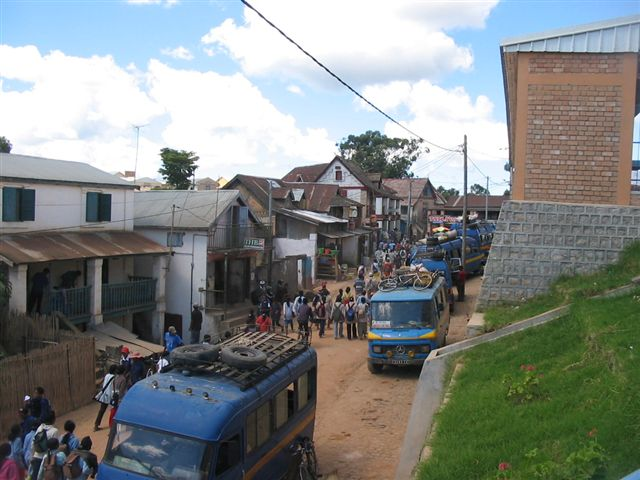

- Location within Madagascar
- Coordinates: 18°24′12″S 47°51′00″E
- Country: Madagascar
- Region: Analamanga
- District: Anjozorobe

Area
  - Total: 512 km^{2} (198 sq mi)
- Elevation: 1,270 m (4,170 ft)

Population 2018
  - Total: 24,117
- Time zone: UTC+3 (EAT)
- postal code: 105

Anjozorobe is a large town in the Analamanga Region, Madagascar, approximately 90 kilometers north-east of the capital Antananarivo. It has a population of 24,117 inhabitants in 2018.

Anjozorobe-Angavo Reserve is one of the last high plateau forest in Madagascar. Another high plateau forest is located in the protected area of Ambohitantely.

== Routes ==
The town is linked with Antananarivo by the National Road 3.

== Rivers ==
The Mananara, an affluet on the Betsiboka River, flows near this municipality.

== Nature reserves ==
The Anjozorobe-Angavo Reserve is situated approximately 11 km east of the town.

== Gallery ==
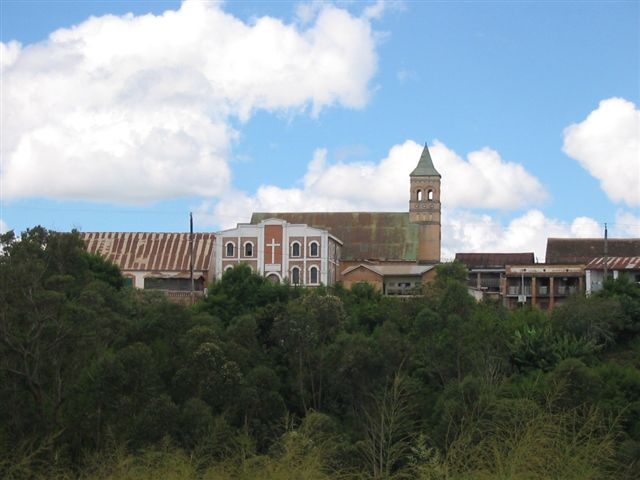
Church of Anjozorobe

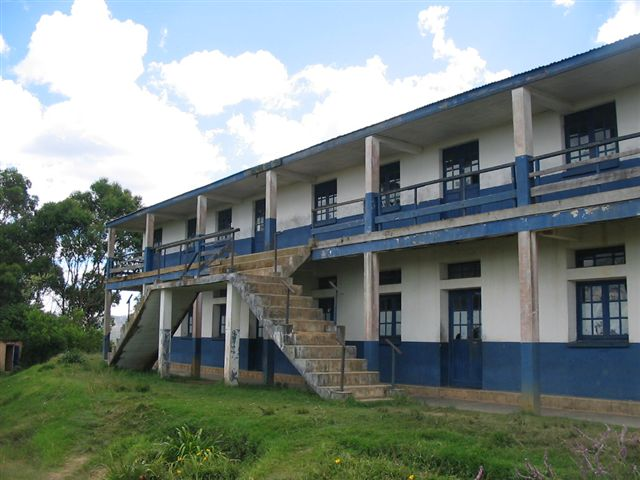
College

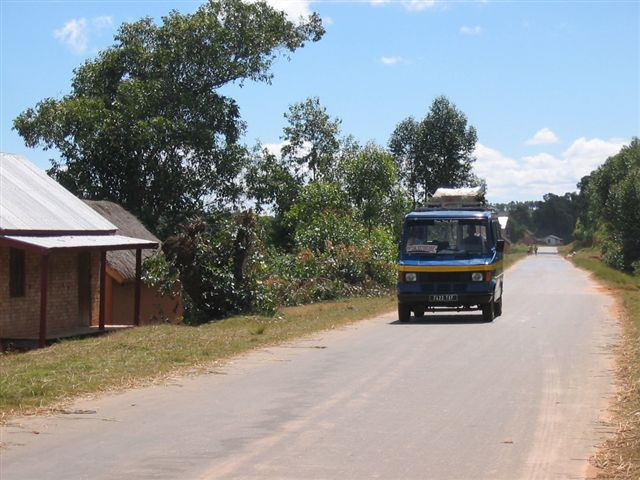
RN 3

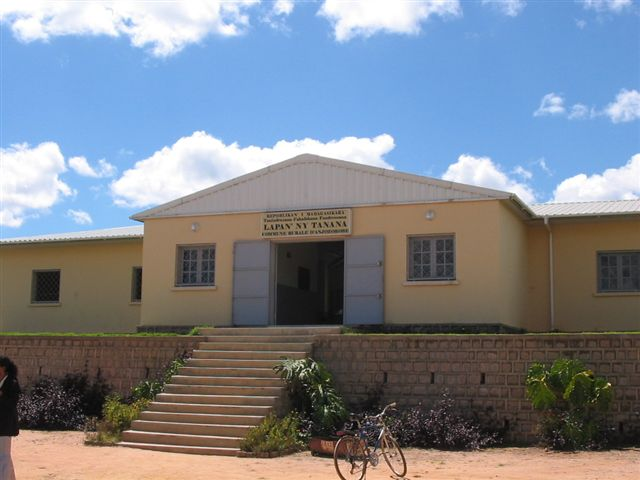
Town hall

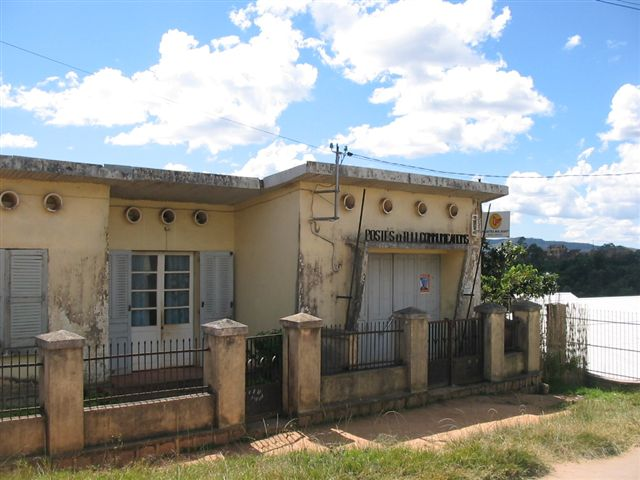
Post office

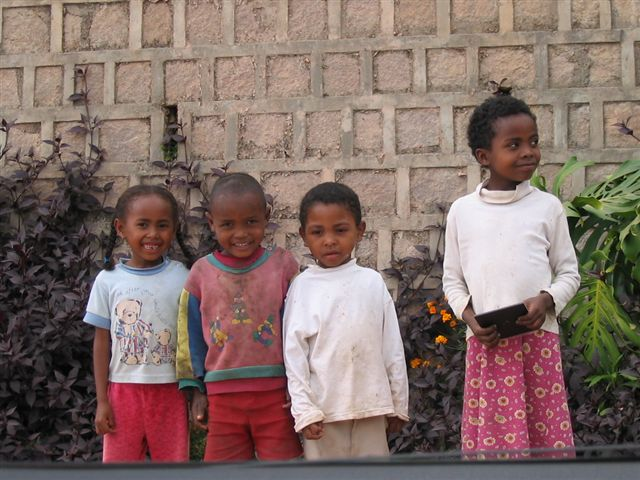
and its people
