= Betafo =

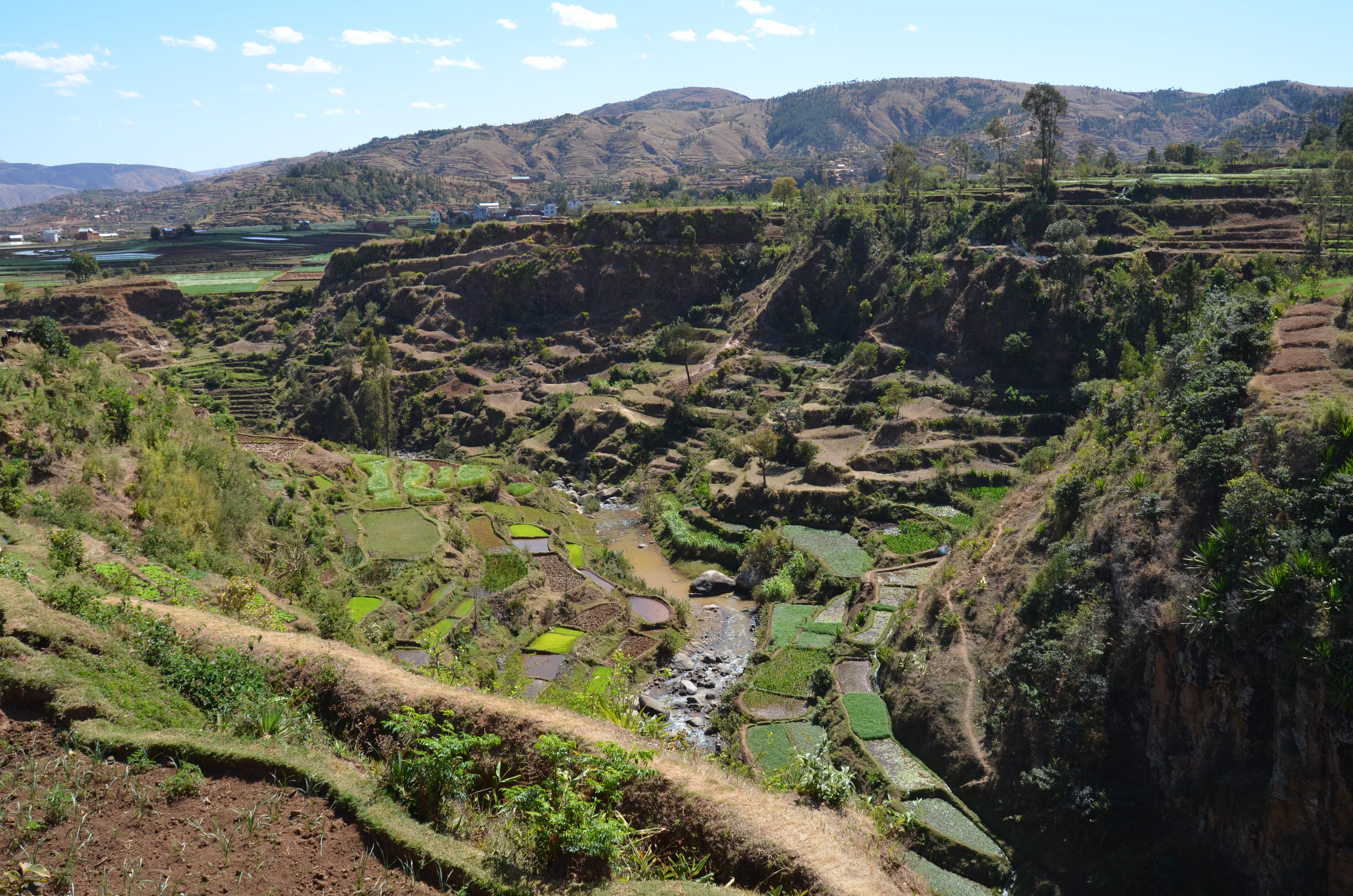
- fields near Betafo

- Location in Madagascar
- Coordinates: 19°50′24″S 46°51′18″E
- Country: Madagascar
- Region: Vakinankaratra
- District: Betafo District
- Elevation: 1,410 m (4,630 ft)

Population (2018)
  - Total: 34,336
  - Ethnics: Merina
- Time zone: UTC3 (EAT)
- Postal code: 113

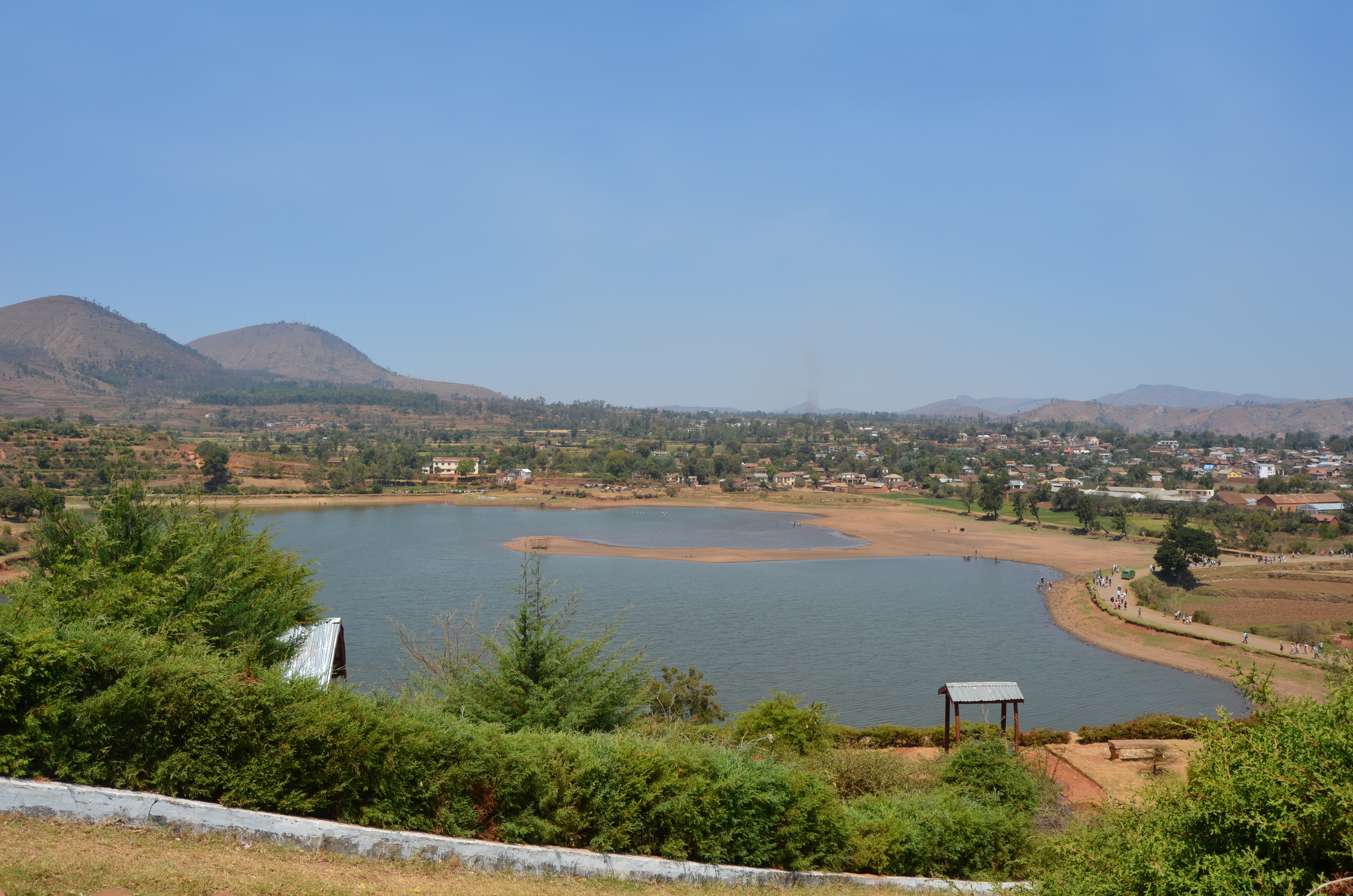
Tatamarina Lake in Betafo

Betafo ("many roofs") is a town and urban municipality in Vakinankaratra Region in the Central Highlands of Madagascar. It is surrounded by volcanic peaks and is situated 22 km from Antsirabe. It is a typical Merina town in the Central Highlands.

The town had an estimated population of 34,336 in 2018 and is the administrative centre of Betafo District.

== Geography ==
Betafo is situated at an altitude of 1,410 metres (4,630 ft) above sea level, in the central highlands of Madagascar. The town lies along the RN34 national road to Miandrivazo, 22 km (14 mi) west of Antsirabe and 191 km (119 mi) from the country's capital, Antananarivo.

== Religion ==
- FLM - Fiangonana Loterana Malagasy (Malagasy Lutheran Church)

The first Lutheran church in Madagascar was built in Betafo by the Norwegian missionaries John Engh and Nils Nielsen in 1867.

- FJKM - Fiangonan'i Jesoa Kristy eto Madagasikara (Church of Jesus Christ in Madagascar)
- Roman Catholic Diocese of Betafo

== UNESCO World Heritage Site ==
The irrigated rice paddies of the area are emblematic of this technology throughout the Malagasy highlands and were nominated to the Tentative List of UNESCO World Heritage Sites in Madagascar in 1997.

== History ==
In the 19th century, it was the capital of Vakinankaratra. The first Lutheran church in Madagascar was built in Betafo by the Norwegian missionaries John Engh and Nils Nielsen in 1867.

== Sports ==
The AS Standon Betafo is the local football club. It plays in the Vakinankaratra regional liga.

== Books ==
- David Graeber: Lost People: Magic and the Legacy of Slavery in Madagascar. Bloomington: Indiana University Press. 2007. ISBN 978-0-253-34910-1.

== Sights ==
- Tatamarina Lake
- Antafofo Falls
- Tombs of Kings of Betafo
