= Antananarivo City Hall =

- Lapan'ny Tanànan'Antananarivo
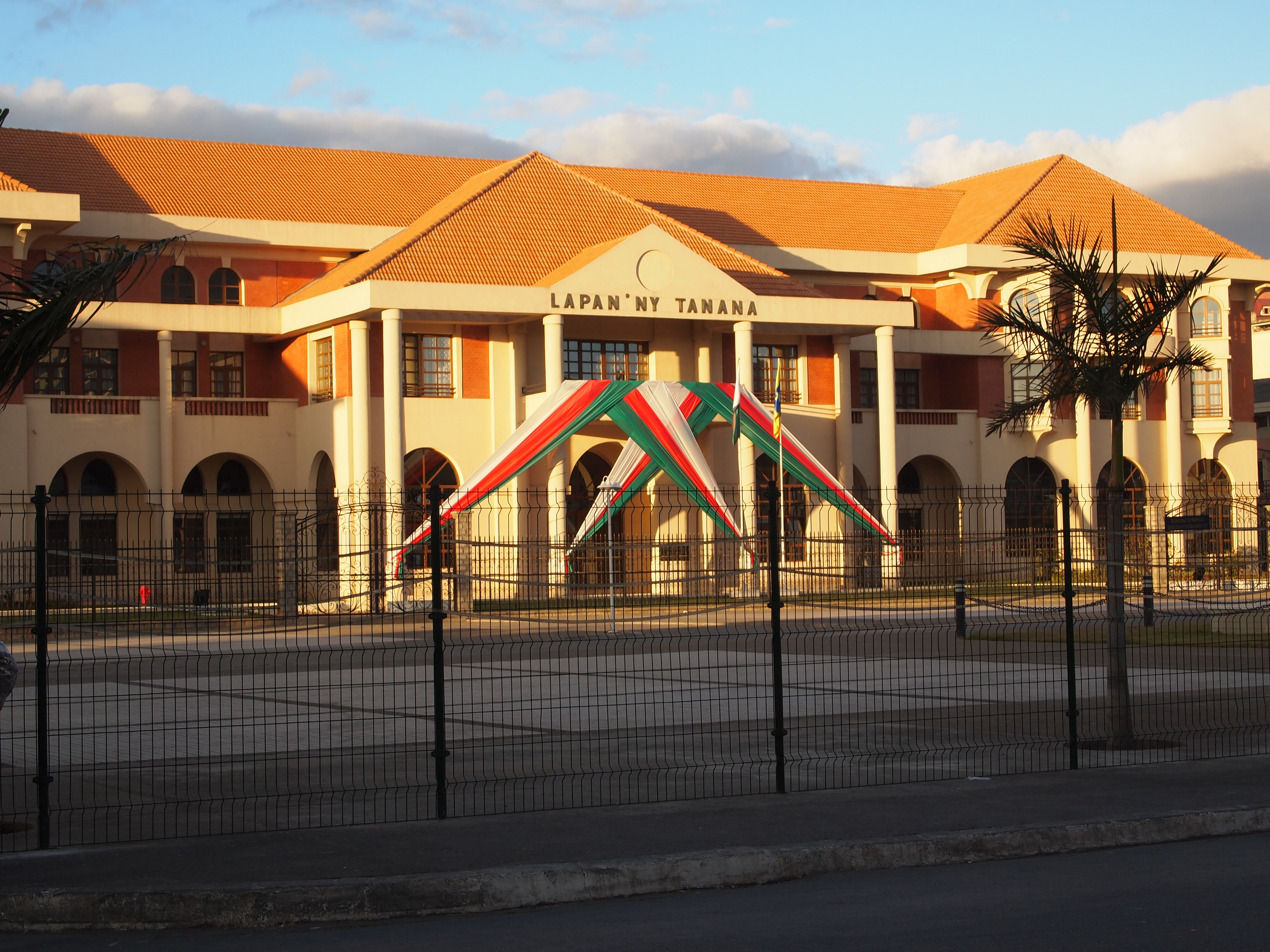

- Location in Antananarivo, Madagascar

General information
- Type: City hall
- Architectural style: Art Deco
- Location: Analakely, Antananarivo, Avenue de l'Indépendance, Antananarivo, Madagascar
- Coordinates: 18.905227°S 47.523749°E
- Construction started: 1935
- Completed: 1936
- Destroyed: May 13, 1972 (fire)

Technical details
- Structural system: Brick and reinforced concrete

Design and construction
- Architects: Original building: Jean Henri Collet de Cantalou; Reconstruction: Mamy Rajaobelina
- Main contractor: Paul Estèbe

The Antananarivo City Hall "Lapan'ny Tanàna" is the building that houses the municipal institutions of Antananarivo, Madagascar, from 1935 to 1972 and since 2010.

== Location and access ==
Antananarivo City Hall is located on Avenue de l'Indépendance in the Analakely district.

It is served by bus lines 129, 134, and 196 of the capital's urban transport network.

== History ==
=== Initial construction and fire ===
The original Antananarivo City Hall was constructed between 1935 and 1936 under the direction of French architect Jean Henri Collet de Cantalou. The building was designed in the Art Deco style, featuring a white stone façade and wrought iron arcades. It was inaugurated on May 13, 1936, by the Governor General of Madagascar, Léon Cayla. The building housed the offices of the Antananarivo mayoralty, as well as reception rooms and cultural spaces.

The city hall was destroyed by fire on May 13, 1972, during riots in Antananarivo protesting against President Philibert Tsiranana's policies.

=== Between 1972 and 2008 ===
After the fire, the building was not rebuilt due to budget constraints. The municipal authorities prioritized other projects, such as funding welfare programs under the socialist mayors of the Second Republic.

There was also a lack of consensus on the reconstruction project, delaying decision-making between those advocating for an identical reconstruction and those favoring a more modern building.

It was not until 2008, with the election of Andry Rajoelina as mayor of Antananarivo, that conditions were met to begin the reconstruction work.

In the meantime, the municipal institutions of Madagascar's capital were housed in the Fivondronana buildings in Ankadilalana, near the Tsimbazaza neighborhood.

=== Current building ===
The new Antananarivo City Hall was constructed in 2011 on the site of the original building. The design was carried out by Malagasy architect Mamy Rajaobelina.

The building continues the Art Deco style of the original city hall. It was inaugurated on December 11, 2010, by the Mayor of Antananarivo, Andry Rajoelina. It houses the offices of the Antananarivo mayoralty, as well as reception rooms and cultural spaces.

== Description ==
The city hall measures 70 meters in length and 30 meters in width. It has three floors, with the ground floor open to the public, including the marriage hall, the municipal council meeting room, and an exhibition space.

The first floor houses the offices of municipal elected officials and civil servants.

The second floor contains meeting and conference rooms.
