= Museum of Ethnology and Paleontology =

- Location: Tsimbazaza, Antananarivo
- Coordinates: 18°55′48″S 47°31′34″E
- Type: Ethnology museum, Paleontology museum

The Museum of Ethnology and Paleontology is a museum located in Tsimbazaza in Antananarivo, Madagascar. The museum displays the prehistoric natural history of the island and way of life of its inhabitants.

== Description ==
The museum presents the island's prehistoric natural history and the way of life of its inhabitants.

It houses a large collection of taxidermied animals and skeletons of extinct local fauna, including giant lemurs. Visitors can also see the elephant bird, a flightless bird weighing up to 500 kg, believed to have become extinct in the 17th century, and capable of laying eggs more than 150 times larger than a chicken egg.The museum also features exhibits that tell the story of the country’s many ethnic groups through their customs and traditional crafts.
