= American School of Antananarivo =

Coordinates: 18.871511°S 47.533738°E

Location
- Antananarivo; Madagascar

Information
- Established: 1969; 56 years ago
- Age: 3 to 18
- Enrollment: 260
- Language: English
- Website: https://asamadagascar.org/

The American School of Antananarivo (ASA) is an English-language international school in Antananarivo, Madagascar for students from Pre-Kindergarten through High School. It provides an international education to around 260 students aged 3 to 18 from over 30 countries. Its campus is located in the Le Park compound in Alarobia, about 4.6 km from the city center.

== History ==
The school was founded in 1969.

ASA became an International Baccalaureate (IB) World School in March 2013. It has offered the IB Primary Years Programme since 2013 and the IB Diploma Programme since 2018. In July 2017, ASA moved to a new campus in Le Park compound in Alarobia. There are 35 teachers and 245 students representing 30+ nationalities.

== Accreditations and Affiliations ==
The school is accredited by the Middle States Association of Colleges and Schools, and graduates receive a U.S. High School Diploma. ASA is also authorized by the International Baccalaureate Organization to offer the Primary Years Programme (3–12 years old) and the Diploma Programme (16–19 years old).

== Campus ==
ASA's campus is located in the Le Park compound in Alarobia.

== Academics ==
Education at ASA is divided in three levels: Pre-Kindergarten, Elementary and Secondary.

- Pre-Kindergarten (ages 3–4): a full day pre-school following the IB Primary Years Programme curriculum combined with a play-based approach
- Elementary (Kindergarten-Grade 5): IB Primary Years Programme with special subjects including arts, music, physical education, technology & maker space, French and Malagasy
- Secondary School (grades 6-12): The secondary program is based on the best of American Curriculum which culminates in graduates receiving a U.S High School Diploma. The program offers a mix of core subjects and elective courses. Grades 11 and 12 follow the IB Diploma Programme, and the first IB DP exams will take place in May 2020.

== Tuition ==
ASA is a non-profit school, and approximately 97% of its income derive from tuition. For the 2019–20 school year, annual tuition rates range from $12,500 (Pre-Kindergarten) to $21,320 (High School). School fees include a one-time pre-registration fee of $150, an annual registration fee of $250, and a one-time capital levy fee of $5,500. Tuition and fees are set each year by the school's Board of Trustees.
