= Antanimora Prison =

Prison in Antananarivo, Madagascar

Coordinates: 18°54′52″S 47°32′31″E

- Interactive map of Antanimora Prison
- Location: Antananarivo
- Capacity: 800

Antanimora Prison, also known as Central Prison of Antanimora, officially Maison Centrale Antanimora – Antanarivo, is a prison in Antanimora, Antananarivo, the capital of Madagascar.

Antanimora was built to hold a maximum of 800 inmates. In 2019, it was reported that more than 4,000 detainees were being held there, with around half of them still awaiting trial. Its extreme lack of hygiene and accompanying infestation of lice, cockroaches, fleas, and rats have been criticized by international organisations. Some judges have been reported to solicit bribes from prisoners or their families in order to guarantee an acquittal or early release.

The prison is separated into blocks and provides one meal per day, consisting of only 300g of boiled cassava. A 2012 U.S. human rights report found that chronic malnutrition was the leading cause of death among prisoners in Madagascar and that the condition affects up to two-thirds of inmates. A study in 2019 found that 38% of female prisoners at Antanimora Prison, which include pregnant women and women with children, are undernourished due to unavailability of healthy food, low calorie intake, and lack of financial assistance.

All records in the prison are still taken by hand, and only one physician serves the entire inmate population. Guards, who only possess antiquated weaponry and nightsticks, are able to place prisoners caught with drugs or a cell phone, or who injure other inmates, in solitary confinement cells, where they also have their meal reduced by half. A staffing shortage has also resulted in some prisoners being appointed as auxiliary guards, where they sometimes get paid bribes to transport food and money to prisoners, and although they are tasked with duties such as weapons searches, these are often not enforced.

The prison has been the subject of several documentaries, such as Behind Bars: The World's Toughest Prisons.
