= Ampahitrosy =

- Location in Madagascar
- Coordinates: 19°02′00″S 47°28′40″E
- Country: Madagascar
- Region: Analamanga
- District: Antananarivo-Atsimondrano

Area
  - Total: 13.5 km^{2} (5.2 sq mi)
- Elevation: 1,260 m (4,130 ft)

Population (2018)
  - Total: 5,654
- Time zone: UTC3 (EAT)
- postal code: 102

Ampahitrosy is a suburb and a rural commune in Analamanga Region, in the Central Highlands of Madagascar. It belongs to the district of Antananarivo-Atsimondrano and its populations was 5,654 in 2018.

It is situated at 16km from downtown Antananarivo. In the north it borders to the commune of Soalandy, in the west by Androhibe, in the south by Antanetikely and in the east by Bongatsara.

== Rivers ==
The commune is crossed by the Sisaony.
