= Ampitatafika, Antananarivo =

Ampitatafika
- Location in Madagascar
- Coordinates: 18°56′00″S 47°28′30″E
- Country: Madagascar
- Region: Analamanga
- District: Antananarivo-Atsimondrano

Area
  - Total: 21.8 km^{2} (8.4 sq mi)
- Elevation: 1,255 m (4,117 ft)

Population (2018)
  - Total: 50,373
- Time zone: UTC3 (EAT)
- postal code: 102

Ampitatafika is a suburb and a rural commune in Analamanga Region, in the Central Highlands of Madagascar. It belongs to the district of Antananarivo-Atsimondrano and its populations numbers to 50,373 in 2018.

The National Road 1 crosses this suburb.

== Rivers ==
The Sisaony and the Ikopa River.
