= List of international schools in Madagascar =

This is a list of international schools in Madagascar.

== English-language schools ==
- American School of Antananarivo (PreK/12 - from pre-kindergarten through high school)
- International School of Madagascar (PreK/12 - from pre-kindergarten through high school)
- British School of Madagascar international setting for pupils to attain a high quality education using the English National Curriculum.

== French schools ==
Preschool (maternelle) through senior high school (lycée):

- Lycée Français de Tananarive in Antananarivo
- Collèges de France in Antananarivo
- Lycée Peter Pan in Antananarivo
- Lycée La Clairefontaine in Antananarivo
- Lycée Français de Tamatave in Toamasina

Preschool (maternelle) through junior high school (collège):

- Lycée Français Sadi-Carnot in Antsiranana - Previously served preschool through senior high school.

Junior high school (collège):

- École La Clairefontaine in Tôlanaro (Fort Dauphin) - Previously served preschool through senior high school.
