= Soavina =

- Location in Madagascar
- Coordinates: 18°57′S 47°29′E
- Country: Madagascar
- Region: Analamanga
- District: Antananarivo-Atsimondrano

Area
  - Total: 9 km^{2} (3.5 sq mi)
- Elevation: 1,245 m (4,085 ft)

Population (2018)
  - Total: 15,658
- Time zone: UTC3 (EAT)
- postal code: 102

Soavina is a rural commune in Analamanga Region, in the Central Highlands of Madagascar. It belongs to the district of Antananarivo-Atsimondrano and its populations numbers to 15,658 in 2018.

It is limited by the Ikopa River in the north-east and the Sisaony in the west. It's located at 15 km from Antananarivo.
