= Ampanefy =

- Location in Madagascar
- Coordinates: 18°58′30″S 47°29′40″E
- Country: Madagascar
- Region: Analamanga
- District: Antananarivo-Atsimondrano
- Established: 2004

Government
  - Mayor: Ramiliarison Fabrice Lova Tina

Area
  - Total: 9.69 km^{2} (3.74 sq mi)
- Elevation: 1,269 m (4,163 ft)

Population (2019)Census
  - Total: 19,135
- Time zone: UTC3 (EAT)
- postal code: 102

Ampanefy is a rural municipality in Analamanga Region, in the Central Highlands of Madagascar. It belongs to the district of Antananarivo-Atsimondrano and its populations numbers to 19,135 in 2019.

== Rivers ==
The municipality is bordered by the river Sisaony that flooded the town in 1956, 1987, 1994 and 2015.

8 Fontany (villages) are part of Anpanefy: Behoririka, Ampandrorarana, Ambohidronono, Ampanefy, Ambohitsoa, Isaingy, Antalata and Malaho.

== Agriculture ==
Rice, beans, tomatoes and potatoes are the most grown agricultural products.
