= Anosizato Andrefana =

Anosizato Andrefana Anosizato Ouest
- Location in Madagascar
- Coordinates: 18°56′00″S 47°30′00″E
- Country: Madagascar
- Region: Analamanga
- District: Antananarivo-Atsimondrano

Government
  - Mayor: ANDRIANJAFY Elidiot

Area
  - Total: 4.2 km^{2} (1.6 sq mi)
- Elevation: 1,310 m (4,300 ft)

Population (2019)Census
  - Total: 26,107
- Time zone: UTC3 (EAT)
- postal code: 102

Anosizato Andrefana is a municipality in Analamanga Region, in the Central Highlands of Madagascar. It belongs to the district of Antananarivo-Atsimondrano and its population numbers to 26,107 in 2019. The capital city, Antananarivo, lies across the Ikopa River to the east.

National road No.1 crosses Anosizato, making Antananarivo's main gateway to Tsiroanomandidy and Miarinarivo.
