= Ambatofahavalo =

Ambatofahavalo Talata Ambatofahavalo
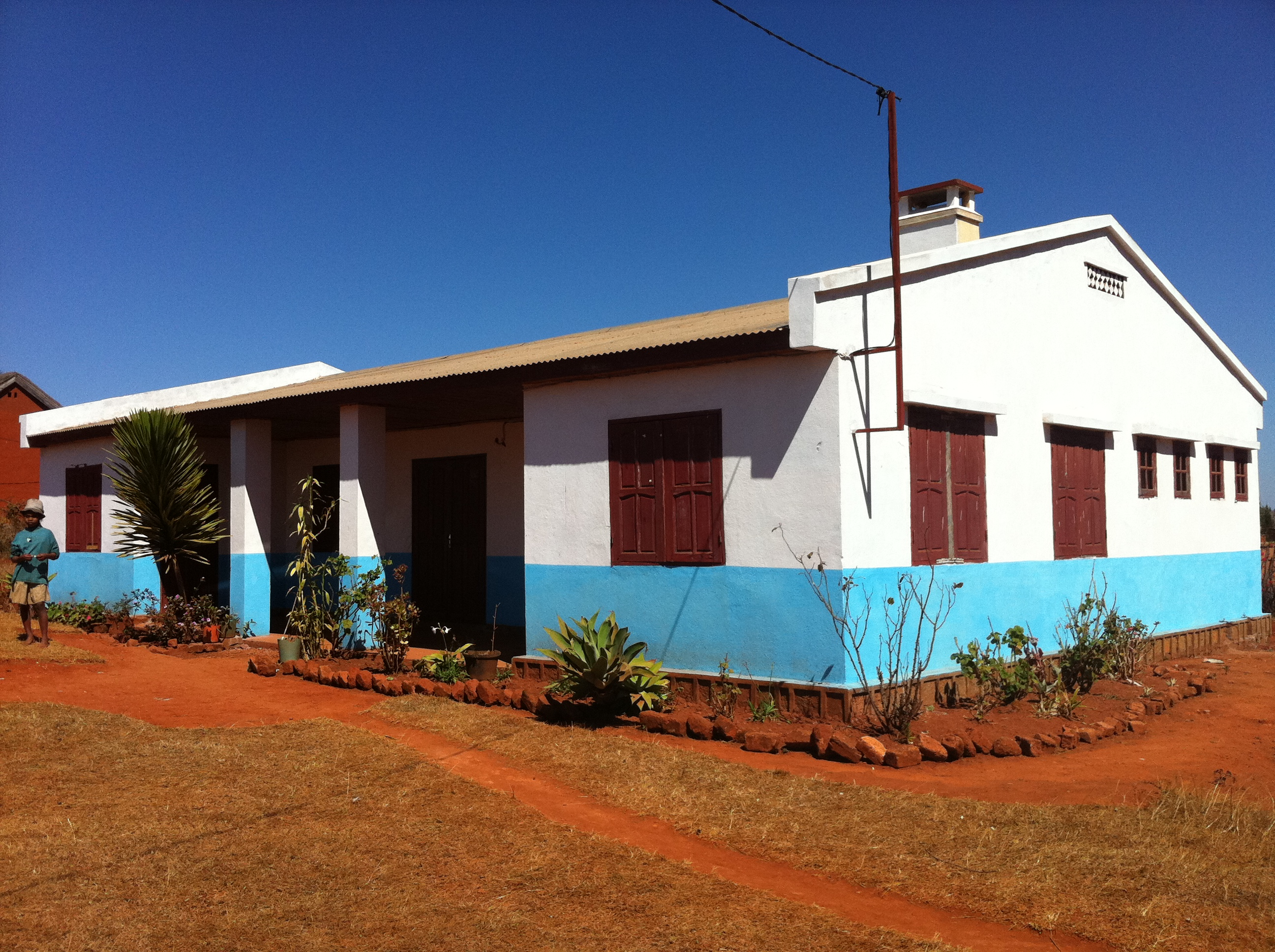
- The dispensary of Ambatafahavalo

- Location in Madagascar
- Coordinates: 19°07′00″S 47°37′00″E
- Country: Madagascar
- Region: Analamanga
- District: Antananarivo-Atsimondrano

Government
  - Mayor: Rakotosamimanana

Area
  - Total: 77 km^{2} (30 sq mi)

Population (2019)Census
  - Total: 6,264
- Time zone: UTC3 (EAT)
- postal code: 102

Ambatofahavalo is a suburb and a rural municipality in Analamanga Region, in the Central Highlands of Madagascar. It belongs to the district of Antananarivo-Atsimondrano and its populations numbers to 6,264 in 2019.

It is situated at 30 km south of the capital Antananarivo on the National road 7. In its north it is bordered by the river Sisaony.

== Agriculture ==
Rice, beans, tomatoes and potatoes are the most grown agricultural products. Also fruit harvesting (ananas, strawberries) is an important factor of the local agriculture.
