= Antotohazo (disambiguation) =

- Antotohazo, Andramasina - Antotohazo, a village in the district of Andramasina, Analamanga, Madagascar
- Antotohazo - Antotohazo, a village in the district of Ankazobe, Analamanga, Madagascar
- there is also a village with the same name, Antotohazo near Fianarantsoa.
