= Anosibe Trimoloharano =

- Location in Madagascar
- Coordinates: 19°10′S 47°46′E
- Country: Madagascar
- Region: Analamanga
- District: Andramasina
- Elevation: 1,413 m (4,636 ft)

Population (2019)Census
  - Total: 8,275
- Time zone: UTC3 (EAT)
- Postal code: 106

Anosibe Trimoloharano is a town in Analamanga Region, in the Central Highlands of Madagascar, located north from the capital of Antananarivo at the Ikopa River. The population was 8,275 in 2019.
