= Ankaraobato =

- Location in Madagascar
- Coordinates: 18°54′00″S 47°28′00″E
- Country: Madagascar
- Region: Analamanga
- District: Antananarivo-Atsimondrano

Government
  - Mayor: RANDRIAMIARISOA Gilbert

Area
  - Total: 3.75 km^{2} (1.45 sq mi)

Population (2019)Census
  - Total: 20,969
- Time zone: UTC3 (EAT)
- postal code: 102

Ankaraobato is a rural municipality in Analamanga Region, in the Central Highlands of Madagascar. It belongs to the district of Antananarivo-Atsimondrano and its populations numbers to 20,969 in 2019.

It is localized at 8 km from the capital Antananarivo on the National road 7 and is limited by the river Sisaony in the East.
