= Fiombonana =

- Location in Madagascar
- Coordinates: 18°53′40″S 47°28′35″E
- Country: Madagascar
- Region: Analamanga
- District: Antananarivo-Atsimondrano

Area
  - Total: 7.2 km^{2} (2.8 sq mi)
- Elevation: 1,260 m (4,130 ft)

Population (2018)
  - Total: 11,230
- Time zone: UTC3 (EAT)
- postal code: 102

Fiombonana is a suburb and a rural commune in Analamanga Region, in the Central Highlands of Madagascar. It belongs to the district of Antananarivo-Atsimondrano and its population was 11,230 in 2018.
