= Ambohijanaka =

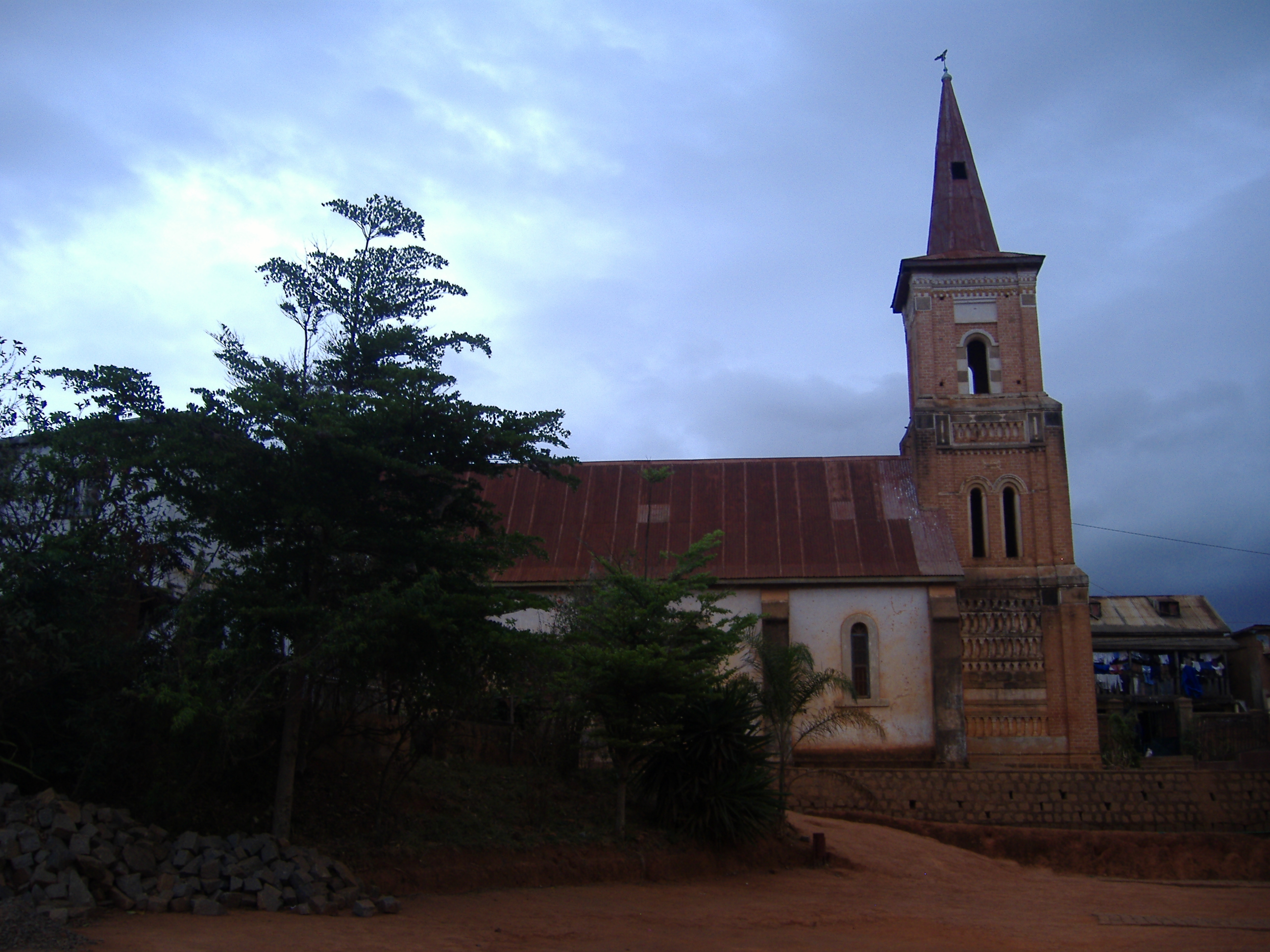
- Church in Ambohijanaka

- Location in Madagascar
- Coordinates: 18°59′00″S 47°33′00″E
- Country: Madagascar
- Region: Analamanga
- District: Antananarivo-Atsimondrano

Government
  - Mayor: RATSIMBAZAFY Alain Jean

Area
  - Total: 23 km^{2} (8.9 sq mi)
- Elevation: 1,260 m (4,130 ft)

Population (2018)
  - Total: 27,088
- Time zone: UTC3 (EAT)
- postal code: 102

Ambohijanaka is a suburb and a rural commune in Analamanga Region, in the Central Highlands of Madagascar. It belongs to the district of Antananarivo-Atsimondrano and its populations numbers to 27,088 in 2018.

== Roads ==
This municipality can be accessed by the National road 7 and National road 2 from Antananarivo

== Bodies of water ==
The Nanganoana lake and Varahana river, an affluent of the Ikopa River.

== Infrastructures ==
All villages of this municipality are connected to electricity.
