= Alatsinainy Ambazaha =

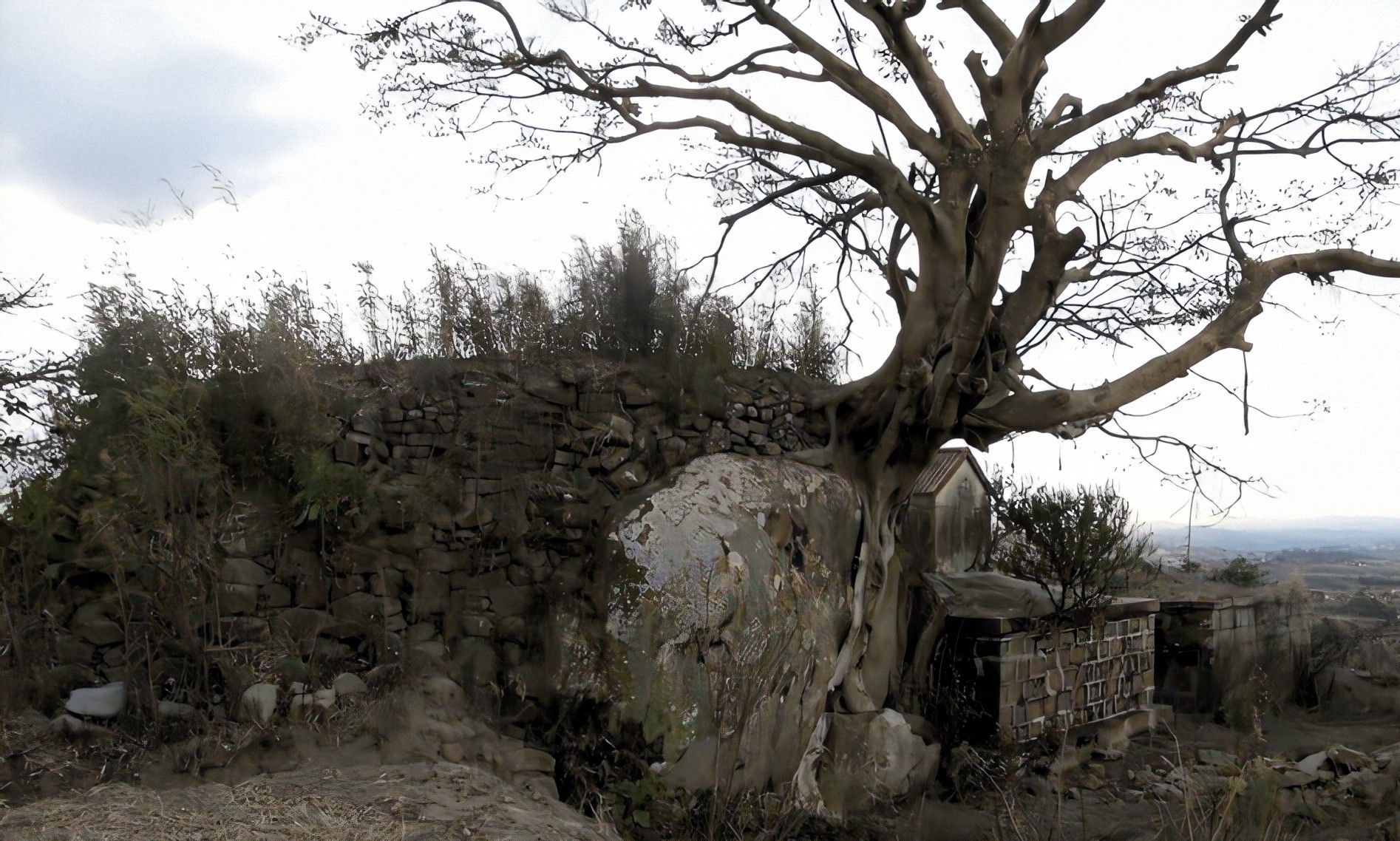
- Sacred stones at Ivatobe Avaratra, a Fokontany of this municipality

- Location in Madagascar
- Coordinates: 18°58′30″S 47°27′40″E
- Country: Madagascar
- Region: Analamanga
- District: Antananarivo-Atsimondrano

Government
  - Mayor: RAKOTONDRIAKA Vavaka Andrianorosoa

Area
  - Total: 18 km^{2} (6.9 sq mi)
- Elevation: 1,259 m (4,131 ft)

Population (2019)Census
  - Total: 5,664
- Time zone: UTC3 (EAT)
- postal code: 102

Alatsinainy Ambazaha is a rural municipality in Analamanga Region, in the Central Highlands of Madagascar. It belongs to the district of Antananarivo-Atsimondrano and its populations numbers to 5,664 in 2019.

It is situated at 16 km in the South-West of the capital Antananrivo and constituted by the villages (fokontany) of : Ambohimahamanina, Morombato, Anjanamanoro, Isoatsimeloka and Ivatobe.

== Agriculture ==
70% of the population are farmers. Rice, manioc, sweet potatoes, beans, tomatoes and potatoes are the most grown agricultural products.
