= Anjoma Faliarivo =

- Location in Madagascar
- Country: Madagascar
- Region: Analamanga
- District: Andramasina
- Elevation: 1,442 m (4,731 ft)

Population (2019)census
  - Total: 6,965
- Time zone: UTC3 (EAT)
- Postal code: 106

Anjoma Faliarivo is a rural municipality in Analamanga Region, in the Central Highlands of Madagascar. It belongs to the district of Andramasina and its populations numbers to 6,965 in 2019.

This municipality was established only in 2015.
