= Andohariana =

- Location in Madagascar
- Coordinates: 20°12′S 47°29′E
- Country: Madagascar
- Region: Analamanga
- District: Andramasina
- Elevation: 1,513 m (4,964 ft)

Population (2019)census
  - Total: 5,104
- Time zone: UTC3 (EAT)
- Postal code: 106

Andohariana is a rural municipality in Analamanga Region, in the Central Highlands of Madagascar. It belongs to the district of Andramasina and its populations numbers to 5,104 in 2019.
