= Fenoarivo, Antananarivo =

Fenoarivo
- Location in Madagascar
- Coordinates: 18°56′00″S 47°26′00″E
- Country: Madagascar
- Region: Analamanga
- District: Antananarivo-Atsimondrano
- Elevation: 1,260 m (4,130 ft)

Population (2018)
  - Total: 25,675
- Time zone: UTC3 (EAT)
- postal code: 102

Fenoarivo (Antananarivo) is a suburb and a rural commune in Analamanga Region, in the Central Highlands of Madagascar. It belongs to the district of Antananarivo-Atsimondrano and its populations numbers to 25,675 in 2018.

This suburb is crossed by the National Road 1.
