= Farariana =

Farariana Farariana
- Nickname: a town of Carion gare TCE
- Location in Madagascar
- Coordinates: 18°55′34.62″S 47°42′19.65″E
- Country: Madagascar
- Province: Antananarivo
- Region: Analamanga
- District: Manjakandriana
- Elevation: 1,362 m (4,469 ft)

Population (2009)
  - Total: 300
- Time zone: UTC3 (EAT)
- Postal code: 116
- Area code: Carion gare TCE

Farariana is a town in Madagascar. It is a part of the commune of Nandihizana in the District of Manjakandriana, and is located 35 km from the city of Antananarivo.

== History ==
Farariana was established in the 17th century and can count among its rulers one of the sisters of Andrianampoinimerina, the king who reunited the Kingdom of Imerina at the turn of the 19th century. At the time of its founding, approximately 1000 people lived in Farariana. After World War II, numerous businessmen born in Farariana moved to Antananarivo and started lumber and woodworking businesses.
