= Ankadimanga =

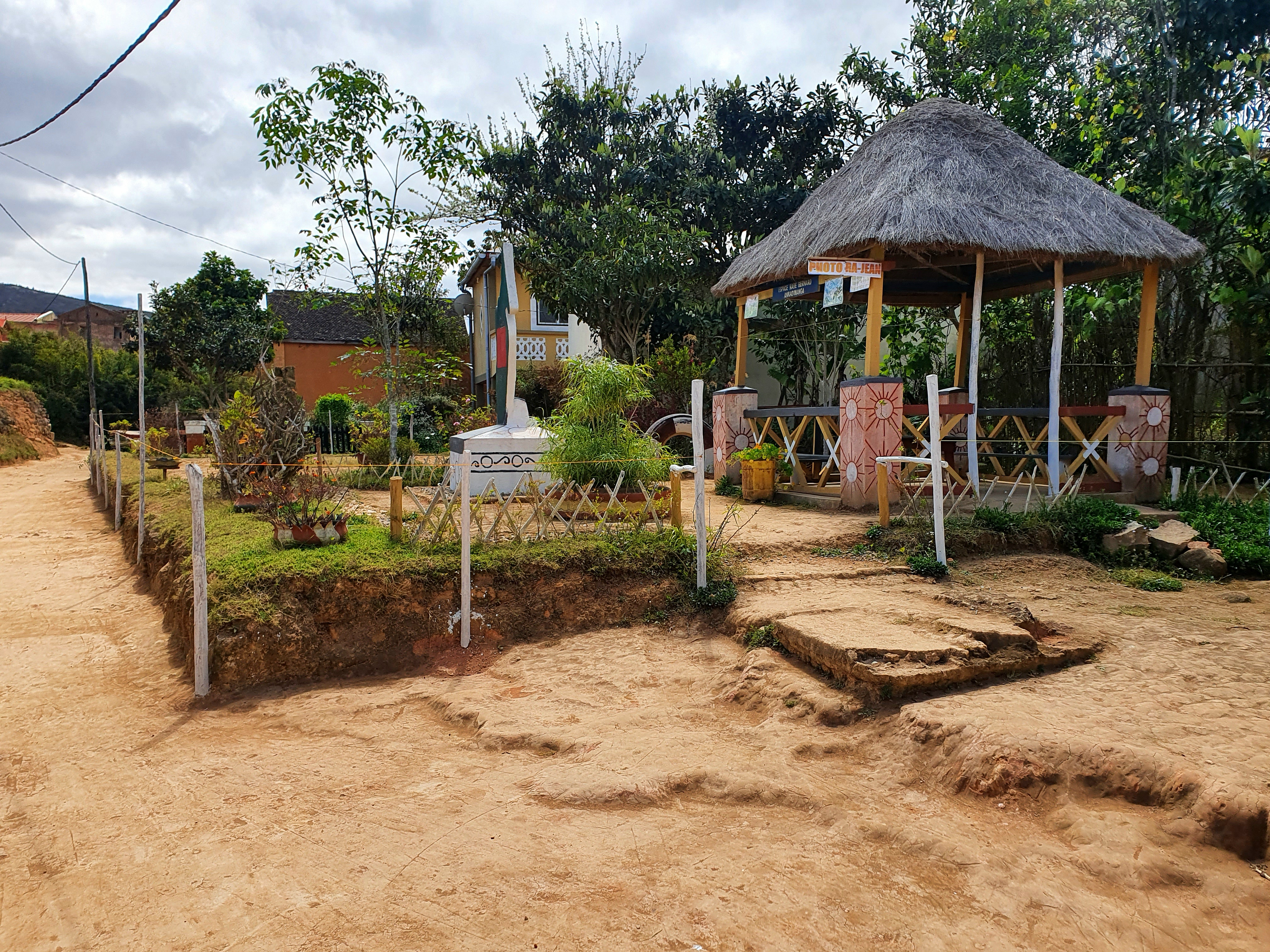
- Ankadimanga

- Location in Madagascar
- Coordinates: 18°58′00″S 47°45′00″E
- Country: Madagascar
- Region: Analamanga
- District: Antananarivo-Atsimondrano

Government
  - Mayor: Befandroana Razafinanja (TIM)

Area
  - Total: 15 km^{2} (5.8 sq mi)
- Elevation: 1,310 m (4,300 ft)

Population (2019)Census
  - Total: 9,526
- Time zone: UTC3 (EAT)
- postal code: 102

Ankadimanga is a rural municipality in Analamanga Region, in the Central Highlands of Madagascar. It belongs to the district of Antananarivo-Atsimondrano and its populations numbers to 9,526 in 2019.

It is located at 12 km East from the capital Antananarivo.
