= Ambohitseheno =

- Location in Madagascar
- Coordinates: 18°47′S 47°48′E
- Country: Madagascar
- Region: Analamanga
- District: Manjakandriana
- Elevation: 1,471 m (4,826 ft)

Population (2001)
  - Total: 6,000
- Time zone: UTC3 (EAT)

Ambohitseheno is a rural commune in the Central Highlands of Madagascar. It belongs to the district of Manjakandriana, which is a part of Analamanga Region. The population of the commune was estimated to be approximately 6,000 in 2001 commune census.

Primary and junior level secondary education are available in town. The majority 80% of the population of the commune are farmers. The most important crops are rice and beans, while other important agricultural products are cassava, sweet potatoes and taro. Industry and services provide both employment for 10% of the population.
