= Sabotsy Ambohitromby =

- Location in Madagascar
- Coordinates: 19°14′S 47°36′E
- Country: Madagascar
- Region: Analamanga
- District: Andramasina
- Elevation: 1,392 m (4,567 ft)

Population (2018)
  - Total: 16,471
- Time zone: UTC3 (EAT)
- postal code: 106

Sabotsy Ambohitromby is a rural commune in Analamanga Region, in the Central Highlands of Madagascar. It belongs to the district of Andramasina and its populations numbers to 16,471 in 2018.
