= Alakamisy Fenoarivo =

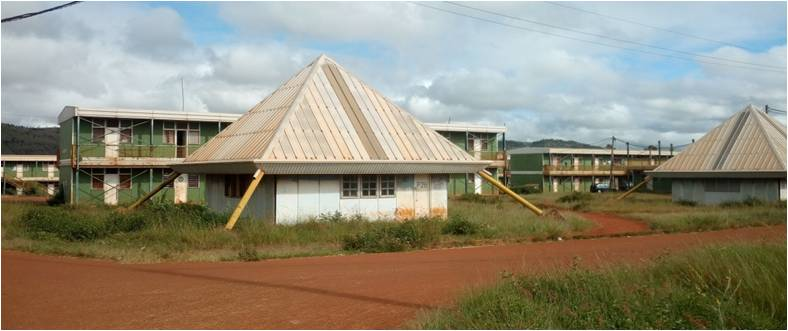
- Campus of the University

- Location in Madagascar
- Coordinates: 18°56′25″S 47°25′20″E
- Country: Madagascar
- Region: Analamanga
- District: Antananarivo-Atsimondrano

Government
  - Mayor: Christian Rakotobe Andrianaivo

Area
  - Total: 25 km^{2} (9.7 sq mi)
- Elevation: 1,260 m (4,130 ft)

Population (2018)
  - Total: 22,529
- Time zone: UTC3 (EAT)
- postal code: 102

Alakamisy Fenoarivo (Antananarivo) is a suburb and a rural commune in Analamanga Region, in the Central Highlands of Madagascar. It belongs to the district of Antananarivo-Atsimondrano and its populations numbers to 22,529 in 2018.

This suburb is crossed by the National Road 1.

== Bodies of Water ==
The Andromba River and Lake Lohazozoro.
