= Sabotsy Manjakavahoaka =

- Location in Madagascar
- Coordinates: 19°11′S 47°43′E
- Country: Madagascar
- Region: Analamanga
- District: Andramasina
- Elevation: 1,442 m (4,731 ft)

Population (2019)census
  - Total: 9,658
- Time zone: UTC3 (EAT)
- Postal code: 106

Sabotsy Manjakavahoaka is a rural municipality in Analamanga Region, in the Central Highlands of Madagascar. It belongs to the district of Andramasina and its populations numbers to 9,658 in 2019.

This municipality was established only in 2015. It covers the villages of Ambalabe, Ambohimamory, Ambohitrandriana, Ampangabe, Mananjara, Mangabe, Sabotsy and Soavinimerina. It is situated at 50 km in the south of the capital Antananarivo.

== Economy ==
The economy is based on substantial agriculture. The region is one of the main suppliers of foie gras in Madagascar.
