= Bemasoandro =

Bemasoandro Bemasoandro
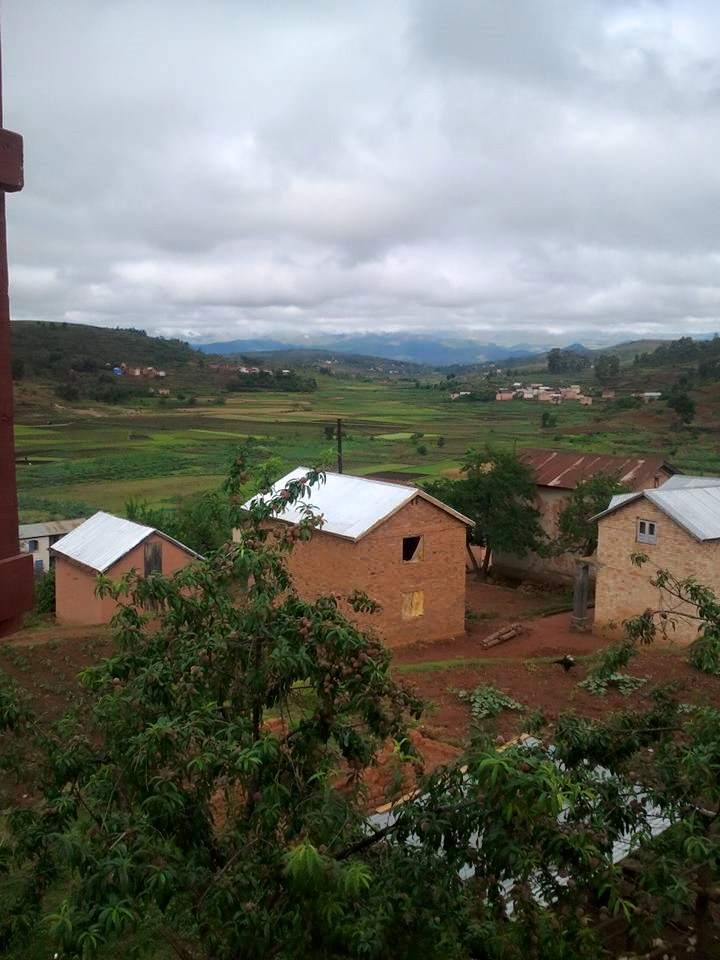

- Location in Madagascar
- Coordinates: 18°55′S 47°29′E
- Country: Madagascar
- Region: Analamanga
- District: Antananarivo-Atsimondrano

Government
  - Mayor: Jimmy Ranitratsilo
- Elevation: 1,550 m (5,090 ft)

Population (2018)
  - Total: 49,744
- Time zone: UTC3 (EAT)
- postal code: 102

Bemasoandro Itaosy is a commune in Analamanga Region, in the Central Highlands of Madagascar. It belongs to the district of Antananarivo-Atsimondrano and its populations numbers to 49,744 in 2018.

== Fokontany ==
The commune has 6 fokontany:

- Ambodiamberivatry
- Ambohidahy
- Ambohijafy
- Anosimasina
- Antanety
- Bemasoandro
