= Ambohidrapeto =

- Location in Madagascar
- Coordinates: 18°54′00″S 47°28′00″E
- Country: Madagascar
- Region: Analamanga
- District: Antananarivo-Atsimondrano

Government
  - Mayor: RAHOLDINA RAOMBANA ZO Andrianavalomahery

Area
  - Total: 5.5 km^{2} (2.1 sq mi)

Population (2019)Census
  - Total: 15,965
- Time zone: UTC3 (EAT)
- postal code: 102

Ambohidrapeto is a rural municipality in Analamanga Region, in the Central Highlands of Madagascar. It belongs to the district of Antananarivo-Atsimondrano and its populations numbers to 15,965 in 2019.

== Agriculture ==
70% of the population are farmers. Manioc, rice, sweet potatoes, beans, tomatoes and potatoes are the most grown agricultural products.
