= Tanjombato =

Tanjambato
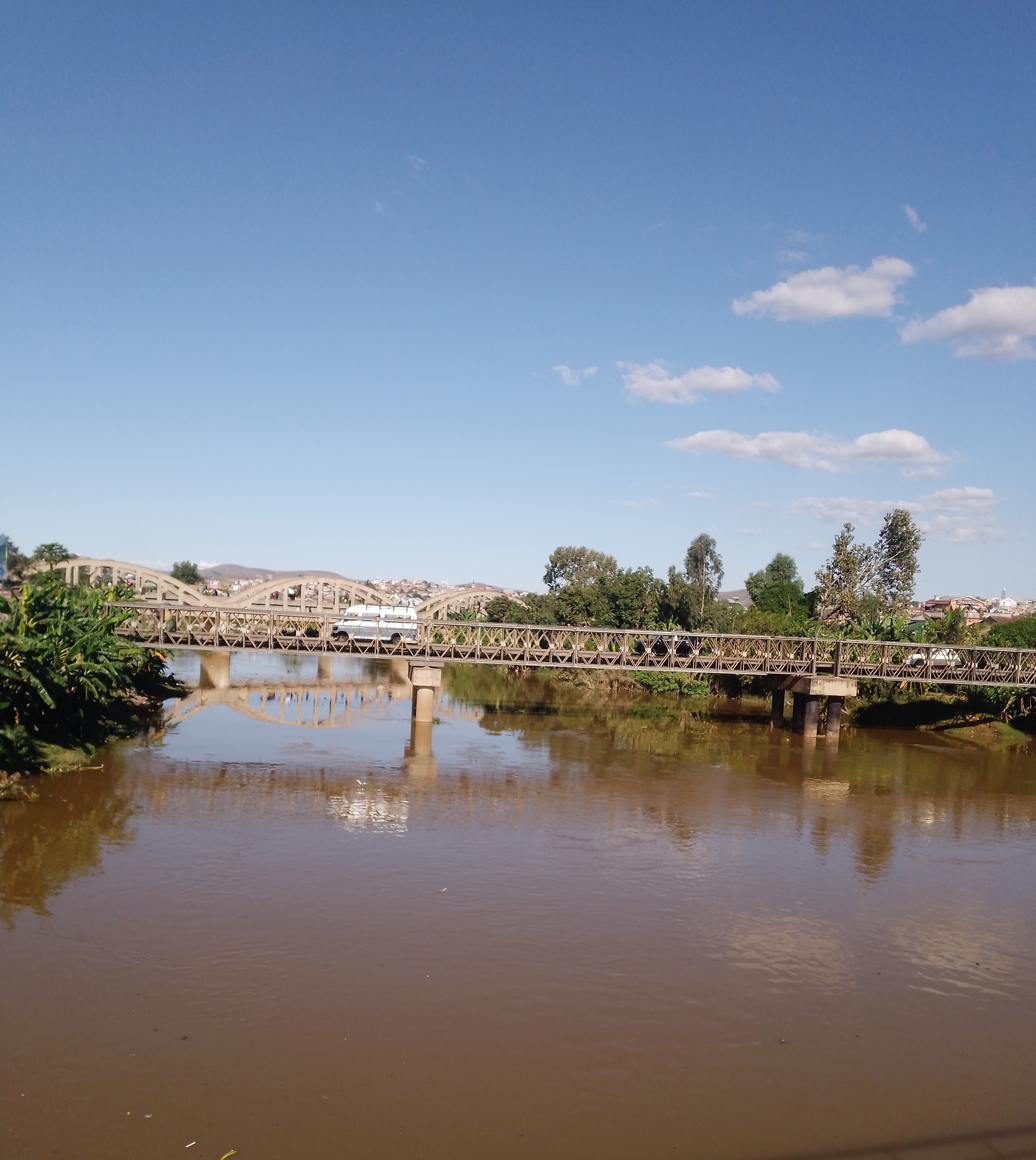
- The Ikopa River at Tanjombato

- Location in Madagascar
- Coordinates: 18°57′00″S 47°31′00″E
- Country: Madagascar
- Region: Analamanga
- District: Antananarivo-Atsimondrano

Area
  - Land: 7 km^{2} (2.7 sq mi)
- Elevation: 1,251 m (4,104 ft)

Population (2018)
  - Total: 50,373
- Time zone: UTC3 (EAT)
- postal code: 102

Tanjombato is a suburb and a rural municipality of Antananarivo in the Analamanga Region (Central Highlands of Madagascar). It belongs to the district of Antananarivo-Atsimondrano and had a population of 50,373 as of 2018.

It is situated at 7 km South from downtown Antananarivo and is crossed by the Ikopa River and the National Road 7.

The commune has 5 fokontany (quarters):

- Tanjombato Iraitsimivaky - 21.282 inhabitants
- Ankeniheny Miray Hina - 12.082 inhabitants
- Ambohimanatrika Mivaotra - 12.577 inhabitants
- Andafiatsimo Mijoro - 7.551 inhabitants
- Tongarivo Mandroso - 9.500 inhabitants
