= Alatsinainy Bakaro =

- Location in Madagascar
- Coordinates: 19°19′S 47°41′E
- Country: Madagascar
- Region: Analamanga
- District: Andramasina

Government
  - Mayor: Razanakoto Thomas Alphred

Population (2018)
  - Total: 20,370
- Time zone: UTC3 (EAT)
- postal code: 106

Alatsinainy Bakaro is a town in Analamanga Region, in the Central Highlands of Madagascar, located at 68 km from the capital of Antananarivo. It belongs to the district of Andramasina and its populations numbers to 20,370 in 2018.
