= Amoronkay =

Malagasy kingdom

Kingdom of Amoronkay
- Capital: Fanongoavana; Ambohitrandriamanitra
- Common languages: Amoronkay-Vakiniadiana dialect
- Religion: Traditional beliefs
- Government: Monarchy
- Historical era: Pre-colonial
Succeeded by
Merina kingdom
- Today part of: Madagascar

Amoronkay was a small kingdom located to the east-southeast of Antananarivo.

== History ==
Amoronkay, along with Vakiniadiana, was originally part of the Kingdom of Fanongoavana, over which Andriantsaratandra reigned. Andriantsaratandra personally submitted to Andrianampoinimerina, after which Fanongoavana was disestablished. Vakiniadiana came under direct Tananarivo control, and Amoronkay was separated, with Andriantsaratandra becoming its king. His territory was preserved as a hereditary fief, and his descendants remained vassals to the Merina sovereigns until the French conquest. The region was historically famous for ironworking, and in the 19th century, the French industrialist Jean Laborde established a cannon foundry at Mantasoa, utilizing the local population's metallurgical skills and access to iron ore.

== Location ==
Amoronkay was a territory situated in the southern sector of the Manjakandriana district, lying between Lake Mantasoa and Lake Tsiazompaniry.
