= Andranonahoatra =

- Location in Madagascar
- Coordinates: 18°54′00″S 46°52′30″E
- Country: Madagascar
- Region: Analamanga
- District: Antananarivo-Atsimondrano

Area
  - Total: 9 km^{2} (3.5 sq mi)
- Elevation: 1,657 m (5,436 ft)

Population (2018)
  - Total: 46,164
- Time zone: UTC3 (EAT)
- postal code: 102

Andranonahoatra is a rural municipality in Analamanga Region, in the Central Highlands of Madagascar. It belongs to the district of Antananarivo-Atsimondrano and its populations numbers to 46,164 in 2018.

== Fokontany ==
7 Fokontany (quarters) belong to this town: Andranonahoatra, Akany Firaisna, Ambanilalana, Ambaniala, Soamiampita, Ambohimamory, Akany Sambatra.
