= Ambalavao, Antananarivo =

Ambalavao
- Location in Madagascar
- Coordinates: 19°06′00″S 47°32′00″E
- Country: Madagascar
- Region: Analamanga
- District: Antananarivo-Atsimondrano

Area
  - Total: 77 km^{2} (30 sq mi)

Population (2019)Census
  - Total: 10,157
- Time zone: UTC3 (EAT)
- postal code: 102

Ambalavao is a suburb and a rural municipality in Analamanga Region, in the Central Highlands of Madagascar. It belongs to the district of Antananarivo-Atsimondrano and its populations numbers to 10,157 in 2019. It is situated at 30 km south of the capital Antananarivo on the National road 7. In the North it is limited by the river Sisaony.

== Rivers ==
The Sisaony and Andromba River cross the municipality.

== Agriculture ==
Rice, beans, tomatoes and potatoes are the most grown agricultural products. Also horticulture (gladiolus, roses) and fruit harvesting (ananas, strawberries) are important factors of the local agriculture.
