= Tsiafahy =

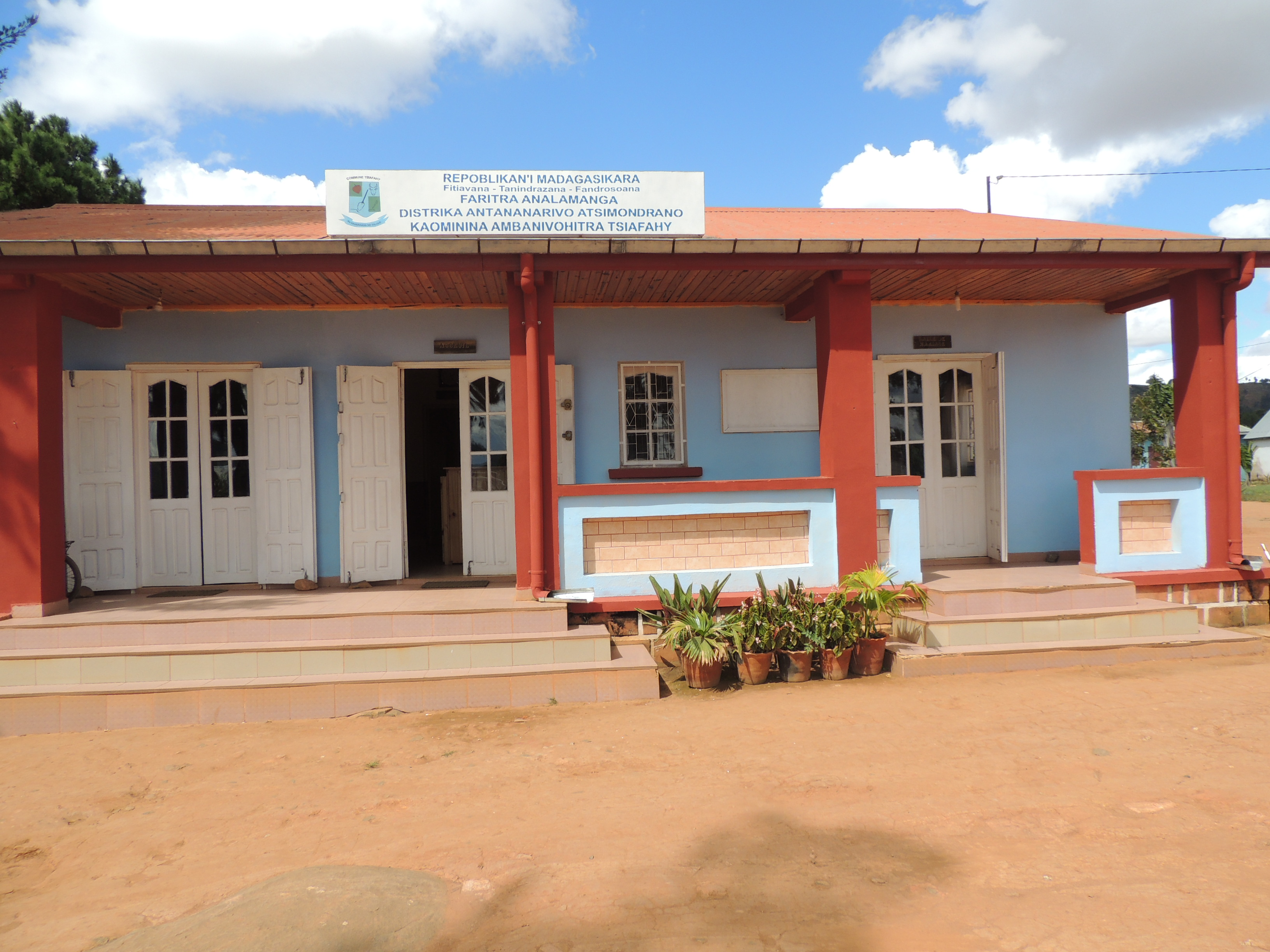
- Town hall of Tsiafahy

- Location in Madagascar
- Coordinates: 19°10′17″S 47°33′00″E
- Country: Madagascar
- Region: Analamanga
- District: Antananarivo-Atsimondrano
- Elevation: 1,288 m (4,226 ft)

Population (2018)
  - Total: 17,024
- Time zone: UTC3 (EAT)
- postal code: 102

Tsiafahy is a suburb and a rural municipality in Analamanga Region, in the Central Highlands of Madagascar. It belongs to the district of Antananarivo-Atsimondrano and its populations numbers to 17,024 in 2018. The seat of this municipality is situated at Ambatofotsy Gara.

This suburb is crossed by the National Road 7.

Tsiafahy is twinned with Grand Port, Mauritius.
