= Antanetikely =

- Location in Madagascar
- Coordinates: 19°03′40″S 47°29′00″E
- Country: Madagascar
- Region: Analamanga
- District: Antananarivo-Atsimondrano

Area
  - Total: 45 km^{2} (17 sq mi)
  - Land: 45 km^{2} (17 sq mi)
- Elevation: 1,308 m (4,291 ft)

Population (2018)
  - Total: 10,511
  - Density: 268/km^{2} (690/sq mi)
- Time zone: UTC3 (EAT)
- postal code: 102

Antanetikely is a rural commune in Analamanga Region, in the Central Highlands of Madagascar. It belongs to the district of Antananarivo-Atsimondrano and its populations numbers to 10,511 in 2018.

== Rivers ==
The commune is crossed by the Andromba river from south to west. Also the Sisaony crosses the commune.
