= Alarobia Vatosola =

- Location in Madagascar
- Coordinates: 19°13′S 47°44′E
- Country: Madagascar
- Region: Analamanga
- District: Andramasina
- Elevation: 1,486 m (4,875 ft)

Population (2018)
  - Total: 14,777
- Time zone: UTC3 (EAT)

Alarobia Vatosola is a rural commune in Analamanga Region, in the Central Highlands of Madagascar in the district of Andramasina. It is located at 70 km south-east of Antananarivo. It counts a population of 14,777 in 2018.

== Economy ==
The economy is based on substantial agriculture. 90% of the population of the commune are farmers. The main crop is rice. The region is one of the main suppliers of foie gras in Madagascar.
