= Andoharanofotsy =

- Location in Madagascar
- Coordinates: 18°58′30″S 47°32′00″E
- Country: Madagascar
- Region: Analamanga
- District: Antananarivo-Atsimondrano

Government
  - Mayor: Henitsoa Rakotorimanana

Area
  - Land: 12 km^{2} (4.6 sq mi)
- Elevation: 1,270 m (4,170 ft)

Population (2018)
  - Total: 58,878
- Time zone: UTC3 (EAT)
- postal code: 102

Andoharanofotsy is a suburb and a rural commune in Analamanga Region, in the Central Highlands of Madagascar. It belongs to the district of Antananarivo-Atsimondrano and its populations numbers to 58,878 in 2018.

It is situated at 9km South from downtown Antananarivo and it is crossed by the National Road 7. 8 suburbs (fokontany) are part of this municipality: Ambohimanala, Andoharanofotsy, Belambanana, Ivoloha, Mahabo, Mahalavolona, Morarano and Volotara.

== Sports ==
- CFF Andoharanofotsy (football), winning team of the Telma coupe 2021.

== Sister city ==
- Linden, New Jersey (USA), since 13 April 2023
