= Itaosy =

- Location in Madagascar
- Coordinates: 18°55′00″S 47°28′00″E
- Country: Madagascar
- Region: Analamanga
- District: Antananarivo-Atsimondrano
- Elevation: 1,260 m (4,130 ft)

Population (2018)
  - Total: 19,041
- Time zone: UTC3 (EAT)
- postal code: 102

Itaosy is a suburb and a rural commune in Analamanga Region, in the Central Highlands of Madagascar. It belongs to the district of Antananarivo-Atsimondrano and its populations numbers to 19,041 in 2018.
