= Androhibe Antsahadinta =

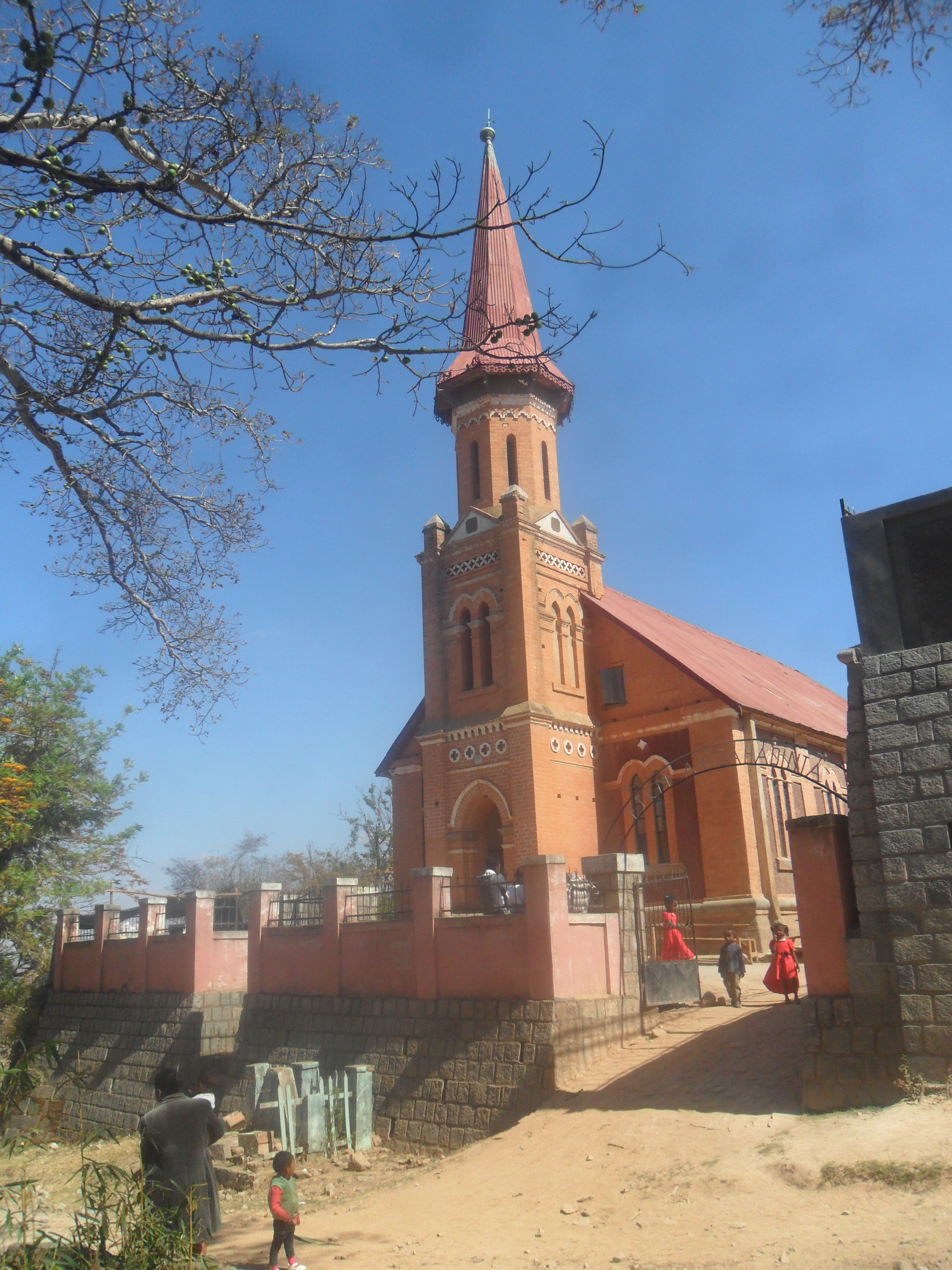
- the Lutheran church of Antsahadinta

- Location in Madagascar
- Coordinates: 19°01′00″S 47°27′30″E
- Country: Madagascar
- Region: Analamanga
- District: Antananarivo-Atsimondrano

Government
  - Mayor: RAKOTOARIMANANA Josepha

Area
  - Total: 32.6 km^{2} (12.6 sq mi)

Population (2019)Census
  - Total: 10,434
- Time zone: UTC3 (EAT)
- postal code: 102

Androhibe Antsahadinta is a rural municipality in Analamanga Region, in the Central Highlands of Madagascar. It belongs to the district of Antananarivo-Atsimondrano and its populations numbers to 10,434 in 2019 of which 90% are farmers.

It is located at 20 km South-West from the capital Antananarivo. To the municipality belong 8 fokontany (villages) that are: Antalaho, Androhibe, Ambohibary, Antsahadinta, Mandalova, Fidasiana, Ankadivory and Ambatomalaza.

== Rova of Antsahadinta ==
One of the Twelve sacred hills of Imerina, the Rova of Antsahadinta is located in the municipality.
