= Fitsinjovana Bakaro =

- Location in Madagascar
- Country: Madagascar
- Region: Analamanga
- District: Andramasina
- Elevation: 1,566 m (5,138 ft)

Population (2018)
  - Total: 22,050
- Time zone: UTC3 (EAT)
- postal code: 106

Fitsinjovana Bakaro is a rural town in Analamanga Region, in the Central Highlands of Madagascar. It belongs to the district of Andramasina and its populations numbers to 22,050 in 2018.
