= Abohimiadana =

- Location in Madagascar
- Coordinates: 19°14′S 47°47′E
- Country: Madagascar
- Region: Analamanga
- District: Andramasina

Government
  - Mayor: Claude Rabearimanana

Population (2018)
  - Total: 23,320
- Time zone: UTC3 (EAT)
- postal code: 106

Ambohimiadana is a rural town in Analamanga Region, in the Central Highlands of Madagascar. It belongs to the district of Andramasina and its populations numbers to 23,320 in 2018.
