= Tankafatra =

- Location in Madagascar
- Coordinates: 19°29′S 47°26′E
- Country: Madagascar
- Region: Analamanga
- District: Andramasina
- Elevation: 1,519 m (4,984 ft)

Population (2019)census
  - Total: 6,867
- Time zone: UTC3 (EAT)
- Postal code: 106

Tankafatra is a rural municipality in Analamanga Region, in the Central Highlands of Madagascar. It belongs to the district of Andramasina and its populations numbers to 6,867 in 2019.

This municipality was established only in 2015 and covers the villages of Tankafatra centre, Andranofankatia, Tankafatra sud, Tankafatra nord, Analandambo, Ampangabe I, Ankazotelo and Ampangabe II. It is situated at 50 km in the south of the capital Antananarivo.

== Economy ==
The economy is based on substantial agriculture. It is one of the main suppliers of foie gras in Madagascar.
