= Morarano Soafiraisana =

- Location in Madagascar
- Coordinates: 19°21′S 47°49′E
- Country: Madagascar
- Region: Analamanga
- District: Andramasina

Population (2019)census
  - Total: 6,518
- Time zone: UTC3 (EAT)
- Postal code: 106

Morarano Soafiraisana is a rural municipality in Analamanga Region, in the Central Highlands of Madagascar. It belongs to the district of Andramasina and its populations numbers to 6,518 in 2019.
