= Soavinandriana, Manjakandriana =

Soavinandriana
- Location in Madagascar
- Coordinates: 18°42′S 47°53′E
- Country: Madagascar
- Region: Analamanga
- District: Manjakandriana
- Elevation: 1,340 m (4,400 ft)

Population (2001)
  - Total: 3,000
- Time zone: UTC3 (EAT)

Soavinandriana is a town and commune in Madagascar. It belongs to the district of Manjakandriana, which is a part of Analamanga Region. The population of the commune was estimated to be approximately 3,000 in 2001 commune census.

Only primary schooling is available. The majority 98% of the population of the commune are farmers, while an additional 1% receives their livelihood from raising livestock. The most important crop is rice, while other important products are beans and cassava. Services provide employment for 1% of the population.
