= Nandihizana =

Nandihizana Carion
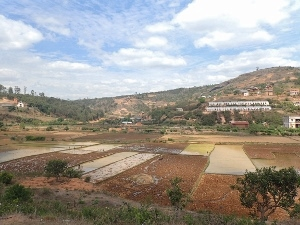
- Nandihizana
- Nickname: Carion gare TCE
- Location in Madagascar
- Coordinates: 18°54′S 47°43′E
- Country: Madagascar
- Region: Analamanga
- District: Manjakandriana

Area
  - Total: 30.9 km^{2} (11.9 sq mi)
- Elevation: 1,429 m (4,688 ft)

Population (2001)
  - Total: 5,000
- Time zone: UTC3 (EAT)
- Postal code: 116

Nandihizana is a municipality in Madagascar. Its previous name was Carion. It belongs to the district of Manjakandriana, which is a part of Analamanga Region. The population of this municipality was estimated to be approximately 5,000 in 2001 commune census.

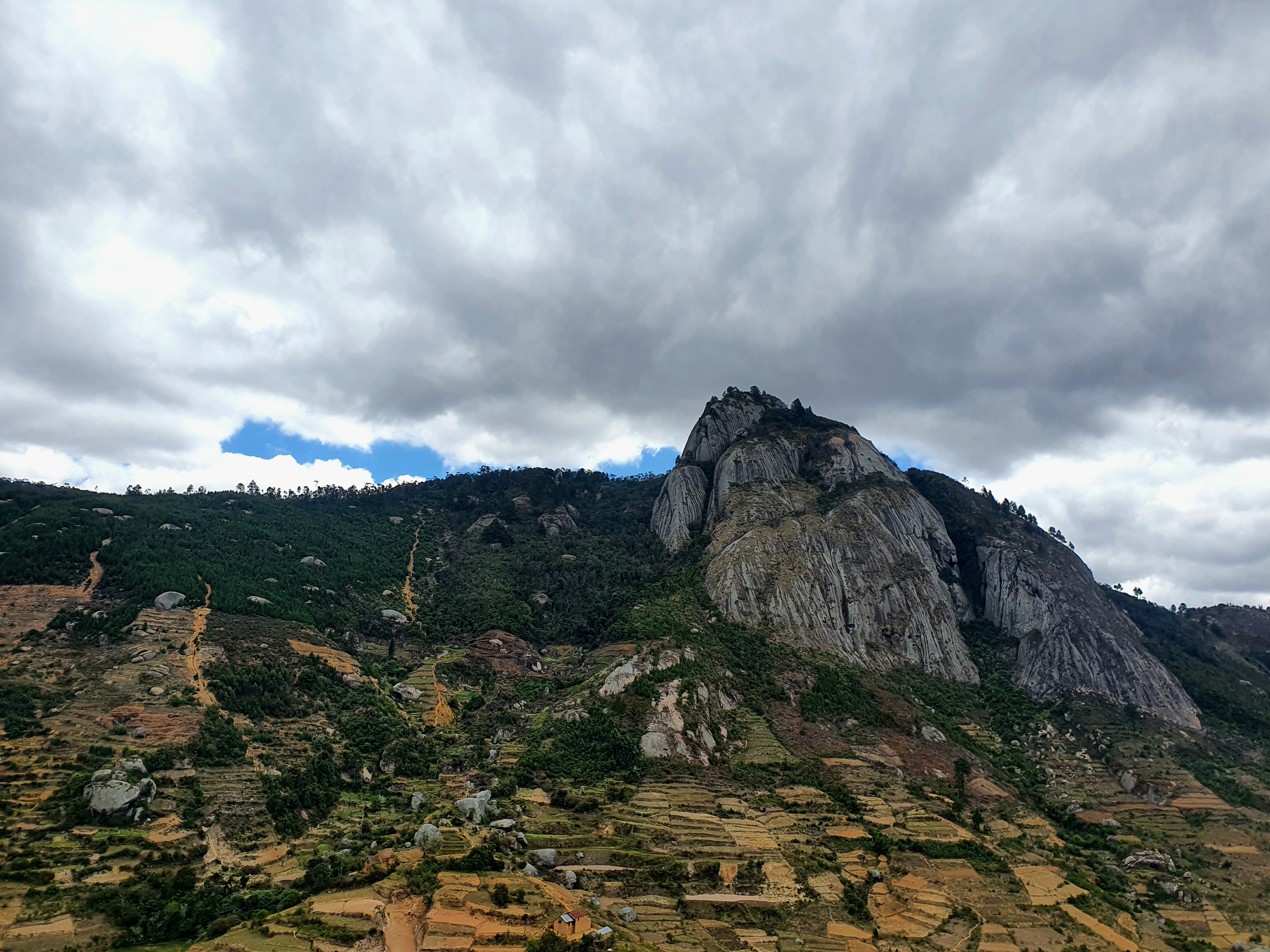
The mount Angavobe

Nandihizana (or Carion) is a famous train station of the line TCE (Tananarive Côte Est). The city became famous with its train station in the seventies due to the trees and wood business organised by Farariana natives businessmen. Primary and junior level secondary education are available in town. The majority 96% of the population of the commune are farmers. The most important crop is rice, while other important products are fruits, beans and cassava. Industry and services provide employment for 1% and 3% of the population, respectively.

== Nature ==
The two inselbergs of Angavokely (1752 m) and Angavobe (1755 m) are situated in Nandihizana.
