= Ankazondandy =

- Location in Madagascar
- Coordinates: 18°41′S 47°49′E
- Country: Madagascar
- Region: Analamanga
- District: Manjakandriana
- Elevation: 1,395 m (4,577 ft)

Population (2001)
  - Total: 16,000
- Time zone: UTC3 (EAT)

Ankazondandy is a town and commune in Madagascar. It belongs to the district of Manjakandriana, which is a part of Analamanga Region. The population of the commune was estimated to be approximately 16,000 in 2001 commune census.

Primary and junior level secondary education are available in town. The majority 83% of the population of the commune are farmers. The most important crop is rice, while other important products are beans and cassava. Industry and services provide employment for 2% and 15% of the population, respectively.
