= Anjepy =

- Location in Madagascar
- Coordinates: 18°51′S 47°43′E
- Country: Madagascar
- Region: Analamanga
- District: Manjakandriana
- Elevation: 1,504 m (4,934 ft)

Population (2001)
  - Total: 6,000
- Time zone: UTC3 (EAT)

Anjepy is a town and commune in Madagascar. It belongs to the district of Manjakandriana, which is a part of Analamanga Region. The population of the commune was estimated to be approximately 6,000 in 2001 commune census.

Primary and junior level secondary education are available in town. The town provides access to hospital services to its citizens. The majority 99% of the population of the commune are farmers. The most important crops are rice and cassava; also sweet potatoes are an important agricultural product. Services provide employment for 1% of the population.
