= Mandrosoa =

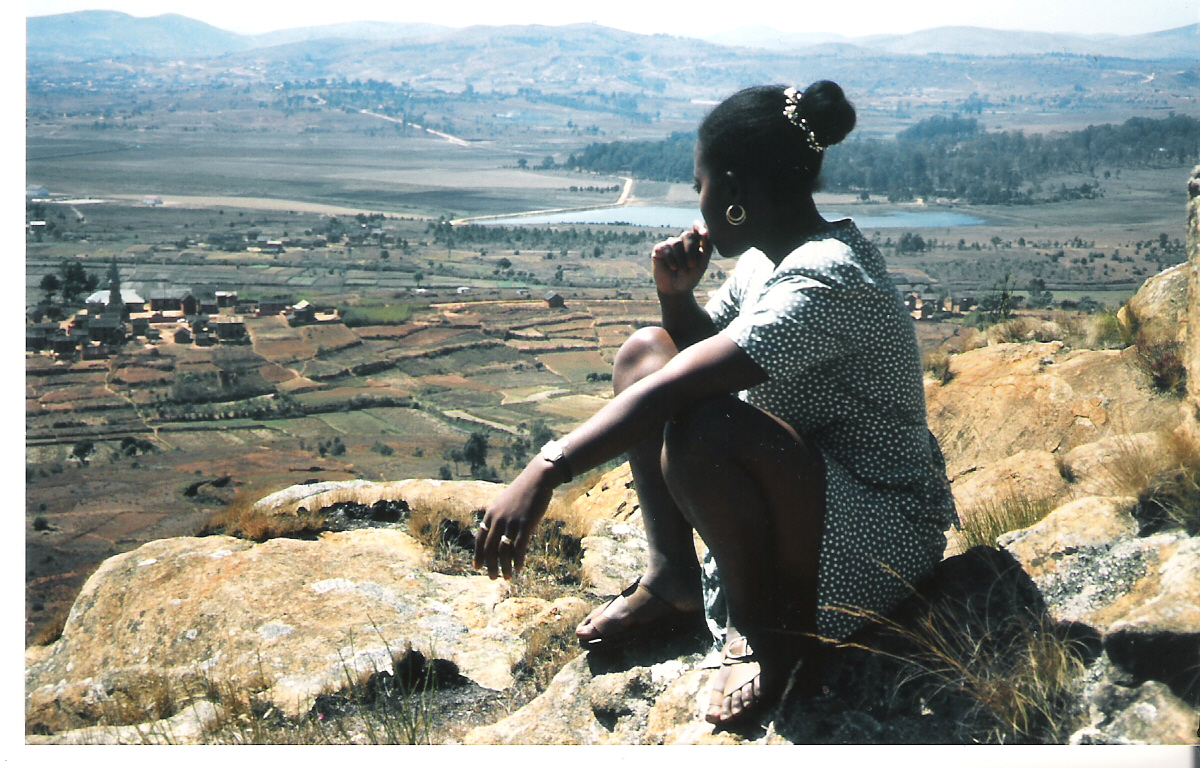
- Mandrosoa

- Location in Madagascar
- Country: Madagascar
- Region: Analamanga
- District: Andramasina

Area
  - Total: 144 km^{2} (56 sq mi)

Population (2019)census
  - Total: 8,257
- Time zone: UTC3 (EAT)
- Postal code: 106

Mandrosoa is a rural municipality in Analamanga Region, in the Central Highlands of Madagascar. It belongs to the district of Andramasina and its populations numbers to 8,257 in 2019.
