= Miadanandriana =

- Location in Madagascar
- Coordinates: 19°2′S 47°47′E
- Country: Madagascar
- Region: Analamanga
- District: Manjakandriana

Area
  - Total: 120 km^{2} (46 sq mi)
- Elevation: 1,388 m (4,554 ft)

Population (2010)
  - Total: 9,889
- Time zone: UTC3 (EAT)
- Postal code: 116

Miadanandriana is a municipality in Madagascar. It belongs to the district of Manjakandriana, which is a part of Analamanga Region. The population was 9,889 in 2010.

== Naming ==
Miadana was the name of the village with the royal residence in former times that was localized at the feet of the Ambohitsoabe hill . To show the admiration and respect of the population this was transformed to Miadanandriana.

== Economy ==
Primary and junior level secondary education are available in town. The majority 79% of the population of the municipality are farmers (62,2¨% growers and 16.8% cattle breedes). The most important crop is rice, while other important products are vegetables, beans, cassava and sweet potatoes. There are also plantations of loquats (Eriobotrya japonica) and peaches (Prunus persica). Forestry is the main occupation of 7.3% of the population, while services provide employment for 2.7%, and fishing with 2% of the population.

== Fokontany (villages) ==
14 fokontany (villages) are part of this municipality: Ambazaha, Ambodifahitra, Ambohijanaharay, Ambohijanaka, Ambohimanjaka, Ambohinofono, Ambohipeno, Ambohitrombalahy, Ambohitsinanana, Ambohitsoabe, Ampanataovana, Andandemy, Merinarivo and Mioridrano.

Only 3 villages out off 14 are connected to the electric grid (Ambohitsoabe, Ambohitrombalahy and Ambohinofono).

== Geography ==
It is situated at 70km East of the capital Antananarivo, south of Mantasoa. The Provincial road 60 crosses this municipality.

== Personalities ==
The queen Ranavalona III was born in the fokontany (village) of Merinarivo.
