= Ambanitsena =

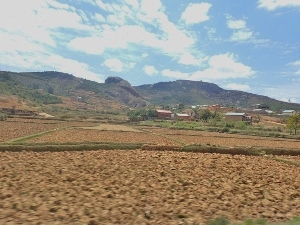
- Ambatokely, one of the villages of Ambanitsena

- Location in Madagascar
- Coordinates: 18°52′S 47°41′E
- Country: Madagascar
- Region: Analamanga
- District: Manjakandriana

Government
  - Mayor: Jaona Rakotoarisoa
- Elevation: 1,412 m (4,633 ft)

Population (2001)
  - Total: 6,000
- Time zone: UTC3 (EAT)
- Postal code: 116

Ambanitsena is a rural municipality in Madagascar. It belongs to the district of Manjakandriana, which is a part of Analamanga Region. The population of the commune was estimated to be approximately 6,000 in 2001 commune census.

Primary and junior level secondary education are available in town. A majority of 80-90% of the population of the commune are farmers. The most important crop is rice, while other important products are beans and cassava. Another source of income is the manufacture of rubble, gravel and pavement stones. Services provide employment for 10% of the population.

== Roads ==
This municipality is located at the National road 2, about 23 km East of Antananrivo.

== Food ==
It is known for its sausages.
