= Ranovao =

- Location in Madagascar
- Coordinates: 18°49′S 47°51′E
- Country: Madagascar
- Region: Analamanga
- District: Manjakandriana
- Elevation: 1,473 m (4,833 ft)

Population (2001)
  - Total: 4,000
- Time zone: UTC3 (EAT)

Ranovao is a town and commune in Madagascar. It belongs to the district of Manjakandriana, which is a part of Analamanga Region. The population of the commune was estimated to be approximately 4,000 in 2001 commune census.

Primary and junior level secondary education are available in town. The majority 99% of the population of the commune are farmers. The most important crops are rice and potatoes, while other important agricultural products are beans, cassava and sweet potatoes. Services provide employment for 1% of the population.
