= Antsahalalina =

- Location in Madagascar
- Coordinates: 18°44′S 47°54′E
- Country: Madagascar
- Region: Analamanga
- District: Manjakandriana
- Elevation: 1,356 m (4,449 ft)

Population (2001)
  - Total: 4,000
- Time zone: UTC3 (EAT)
- Postal code: 116

Antsahalalina is a rural municipality in Madagascar. It belongs to the district of Manjakandriana, which is a part of Analamanga Region. The population of the commune was estimated to be approximately 4,000 in 2001 commune census.

Primary and junior level secondary education are available in town. The majority 95% of the population of the commune are farmers. The most important crop is rice, while other important products are beans, cassava and sweet potatoes. Services provide employment for 5% of the population.
