= French people in Madagascar =

Ethnic group

Total population
- 19,000 (1997 estimate)

Regions with significant populations
- Antananarivo, Toamasina, Mahajanga, Antsiranana

Languages
- French, Malagasy, Betsimisaraka

Religion
- Christianity

Related ethnic groups
- Franco-Mauritian, Franco-Seychellois, White African

There is a small but recognizable community of French people in Madagascar, of whom the vast majority are born in Madagascar and are descended from former settlers and colonists from France who settled in Madagascar during the 19th and 20th centuries. They constitute a minority ethnic group of Madagascar.

== Society ==
=== Religious affiliation ===
87% of the French population in Madagascar are Christian adherents. The vast majority of French Christian adherents in Madagascar are Roman Catholic. A small number are Protestant. The remainder of French people residing in Madagascar are mostly non-religious, but a small minority are Jews.

== Language ==
The majority of the French population in Madagascar speak French as their first language. However, some also speak various local languages, such as Malagasy, or dialects such as Plateau Malagasy and Betsimisaraka Malagasy.

== Education ==
Preschool (maternelle) through senior high school (lycée):

- Lycée Français de Tananarive in Antananarivo
- Collèges de France in Antananarivo
- Lycée Peter Pan in Antananarivo
- Lycée La Clairefontaine in Antananarivo
- Lycée Français de Tamatave in Toamasina

Preschool (maternelle) through junior high school (collège):

- Collège français Jules-Verne in Antsirabe
- Lycée Français Sadi-Carnot in Antsiranana – Previously served preschool through senior high school.
- Collège français René-Cassin in Fianarantsoa
- Collège français Françoise-Dolto in Majunga
- Collège Étienne-de-Flacourt in Toliara (Tuléar)

Junior high school (collège):

- École La Clairefontaine in Tôlanaro (Fort Dauphin) – Previously served preschool through senior high school.

Preschool (maternelle) through primary school (primaire):

- École Bird in Antananarivo
- École primaire française Charles-Baudelaire in Ambanja
- École primaire française d'Antalaha
- École primaire française de Fort-Dauphin in Tôlanaro

Former schools:

- École française du lac Alaotra in Ambatondrazaka – Preschool to primary school
- École de l'Alliance in Morondava – Preschool to primary school
- École de la Francophonie in Anantanarivo, preschool through primary school
- École Sully in Anantanrivo, preschool through primary school

== See also ==
- White African
- Franco-Mauritian
- Franco-Seychellois
- Huguenots in South Africa
- France–Madagascar relations
