= Antotohazo, Andramasina =

Antotohazo
- Location in Madagascar
- Coordinates: 19°20′S 47°44′E
- Country: Madagascar
- Region: Analamanga
- District: Andramasina
- Elevation: 1,600 m (5,200 ft)

Population
  - Total: 4,390
- Time zone: UTC3 (EAT)
- postal code: 106

Antotohazo is a town in Analamanga Region, in the Central Highlands of Madagascar, located north-west from the capital of Antananarivo. It has a population of 4,390 in 2018.
