= Ambatolaona =

- Location in Madagascar
- Coordinates: 18°56′S 47°54′E
- Country: Madagascar
- Region: Analamanga
- District: Manjakandriana

Area
  - Total: 120 km^{2} (46 sq mi)
- Elevation: 1,380 m (4,530 ft)

Population (2001)
  - Total: 5,000
- Time zone: UTC3 (EAT)
- Postal code: 116

Ambatolaona is a rural municipality in Madagascar. It belongs to the district of Manjakandriana, which is a part of Analamanga Region. The population of the commune was estimated to be approximately 5,000 in 2001 commune census.

Only primary schooling is available. The majority 94.5% of the population of the commune are farmers. The most important crops are rice and beans, while other important agricultural products are maize, sweet potatoes and potatoes. Industry and services provide employment for 0.5% and 5% of the population, respectively.

== Roads ==
This municipality is crossed by the National Road 2.

== Lakes ==
A part of Lake Mantasoa belongs to this municipality.

== Tourism ==
The forest station of Saha Maintsoanala.

== Epidemcs ==
In November 2022 the pest had been reported from the village of Antanjona that belongs to this municipality.
