= Sadabe =

- Location in Madagascar
- Coordinates: 18°38′S 47°42′E
- Country: Madagascar
- Region: Analamanga
- District: Manjakandriana
- Elevation: 1,388 m (4,554 ft)

Population (2001)
  - Total: 17,000
- Time zone: UTC3 (EAT)

Sadabe is a town and commune in Madagascar. It belongs to the district of Manjakandriana, which is a part of Analamanga Region. The population of the commune was estimated to be approximately 17,000 in 2001 commune census.

Primary and junior level secondary education are available in town. The majority 98% of the population of the commune are farmers. The most important crops are rice and cucumber, while other important agricultural products are beans and cassava. Services provide employment for 2% of the population.
