= Ambatomanga, Manjakandriana =

Ambatomanga
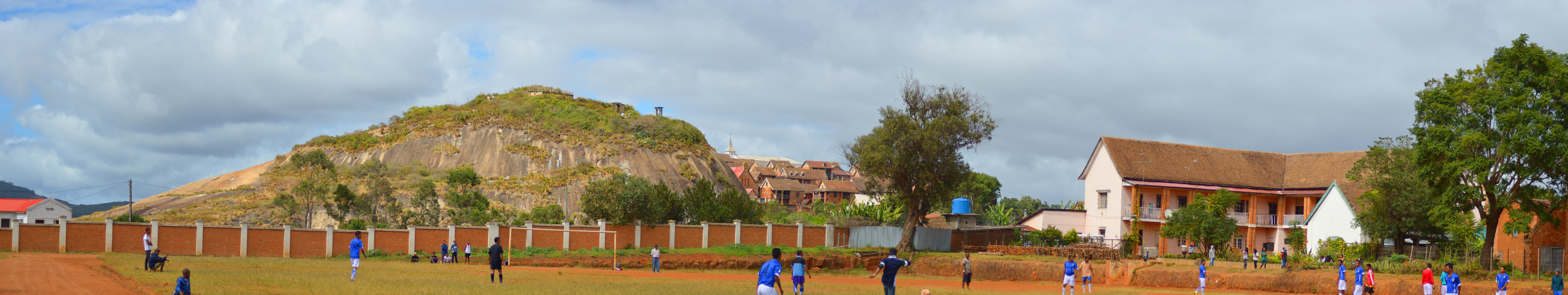
- The village of Ambatomanga with the immense granite rock overlooking it as a background

- Location in Madagascar
- Coordinates: 18°58′S 47°45′E
- Country: Madagascar
- Region: Analamanga
- District: Manjakandriana

Area
  - Total: 3,073 km^{2} (1,186 sq mi)
- Elevation: 1,394 m (4,573 ft)

Population (2018)
  - Total: 6,049
- Time zone: UTC3 (EAT)
- Postal code: 116

Ambatomanga is a town and commune in Madagascar. It belongs to the district of Manjakandriana, which is part of the Analamanga Region. The population of the commune was estimated to be approximately 6,049 in 2018.

Primary and junior level secondary education are available in town. The majority 67% of the population of the commune are farmers, while an additional 25% receive their livelihood from raising livestock. The most important crop is rice, while other important products are cassava and sweet potatoes. Industry and services provide employment for 3% and 5% of the population, respectively.
