= Bongatsara =

- Location in Madagascar
- Coordinates: 19°02′00″S 47°32′30″E
- Country: Madagascar
- Region: Analamanga
- District: Antananarivo-Atsimondrano

Area
  - Total: 34.26 km^{2} (13.23 sq mi)
- Elevation: 1,350 m (4,430 ft)

Population (2018)
  - Total: 22,452
- Time zone: UTC3 (EAT)
- postal code: 102

Bongatsara is a suburb and a rural commune in Analamanga Region, in the Central Highlands of Madagascar. It belongs to the district of Antananarivo-Atsimondrano and its populations numbers to 22,452 in 2018.

This suburb is crossed by the National Road 7.
