= Collège de France (disambiguation) =

College de France (English: College of France) or variation, may refer to:

- Collège de France (English: French College), Paris, France; a tertiary education and research institute
- Collèges de France (English: French Colleges; formerly Collège de France), Antananarivo, Madagascar; a French international school
- Collège International Marie de France (English: de France College; formerly Collège Marie de France), Montreal, Quebec, Canada; a private school named after poet Marie de France

== See also ==
- List of universities and colleges in France
- French College in Agadir (French: Lycée Français d'Agadir), Quartier Founty-Bensergao, Agadir, Morocco; a French international school
