= Ambohitrolomahitsy =

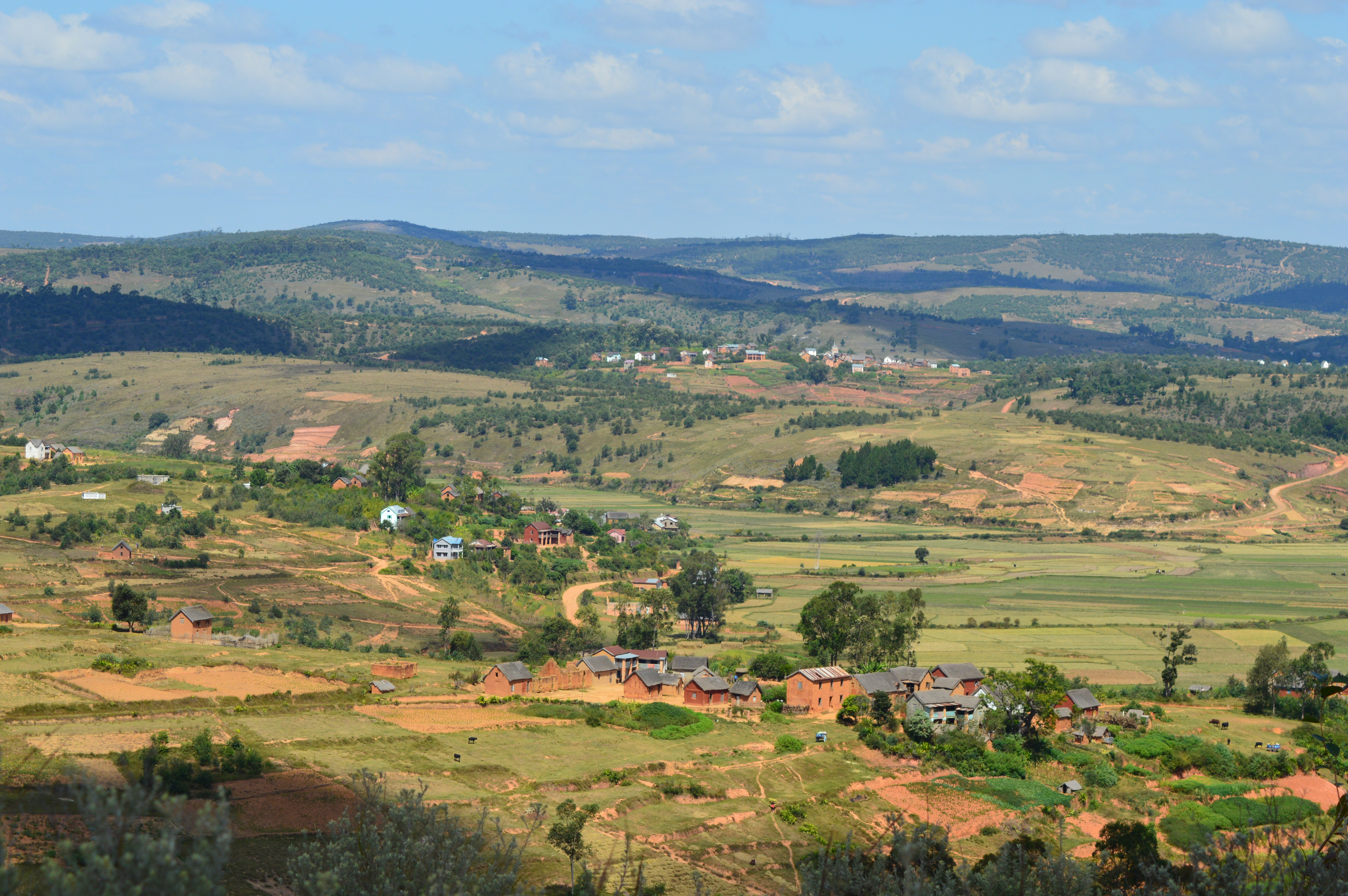
- Ambohitrolomahitsy

- Location in Madagascar
- Coordinates: 18°42′S 47°41′E
- Country: Madagascar
- Region: Analamanga
- District: Manjakandriana
- Elevation: 1,422 m (4,665 ft)

Population (2001)
  - Total: 17,000
- Time zone: UTC3 (EAT)

Ambohitrolomahitsy is a town and commune in Madagascar. It belongs to the district of Manjakandriana, which is a part of Analamanga Region. The population of the commune was estimated to be approximately 17,000 in 2001 commune census.

Primary and junior level secondary education are available in town. The majority 90% of the population of the commune are farmers. The most important crop is rice, while other important products are beans, cassava and sweet potatoes. Industry and services provide employment for 0.1% and 9.9% of the population, respectively.

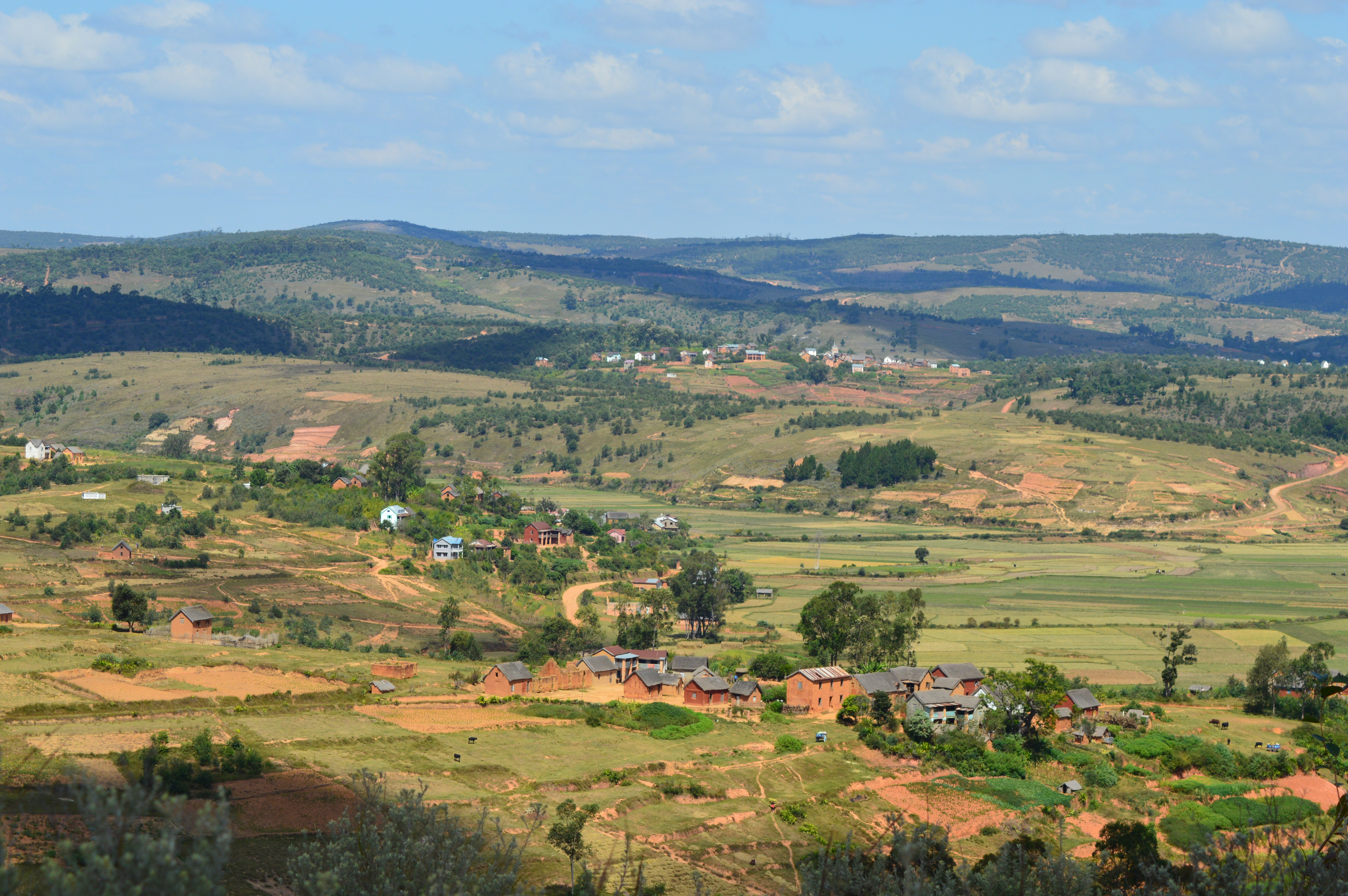
The small town of Ambohitrolomahitsy
