= Anjoma Betoho =

- Location in Madagascar
- Coordinates: 18°49′S 47°43′E
- Country: Madagascar
- Region: Analamanga
- District: Manjakandriana
- Elevation: 1,477 m (4,846 ft)

Population (2001)
  - Total: 3,000
- Time zone: UTC3 (EAT)

Anjoma Betoho is a town and commune in Madagascar. It belongs to the district of Manjakandriana, which is a part of Analamanga Region. The population of the commune was estimated to be approximately 3,000 in the 2001 commune census.

Primary and junior level secondary education are available in town. The majority 97% of the population of the commune are farmers, while an additional 2% receives their livelihood from raising livestock. The most important crops are rice and bambara groundnut, while other important agricultural products are cassava and sweet potatoes. Services provide employment for 1% of the population.
