= Andramasina (disambiguation) =

== Localities ==
- Andramasina, a municipality in Analamanga.

== Names ==
- Andriamasinavalona (1675–1710) - a king of Merina.
