= Ambalavao (disambiguation) =

Ambalavao can stand for the following municipalities. Both are in Madagascar:

- Ambalavao, Antananarivo - a rural municipality south of Antananarivo.
- Ambalavao - an urban municipality in Haute Matsiatra.
