= Lycée Peter Pan =

French school in Madagascar

Lycée Peter Pan, formerly École Peter Pan, is a French international school in Manarintsoa, Ambohijanaka, Antananarivo, Madagascar. It serves preschool until the end of senior high school (lycée). As of 2018 it had 807 students, including 56 French students. The 5,600-square-metre (60,000 sq ft) campus is located in the Imerimanjaka area.

Its original location in Mahamasina opened in 1971. It closed due to management issues in 1976 and reopened in 1980. In 1993 the first high school graduates (recipients of the French baccalaureate) graduated. The land for the current campus was acquired in 2013, and the cornerstone of the current campus was laid on Friday 20 September of that year. The current campus opened on 8 May 2015.

== See also ==
- Education in Madagascar
- List of international schools
- French people in Madagascar
