= Lycée Français de Tamatave =

- Toamasina; Madagascar

Information
- School type: International School
- Established: 1973
- Age: 2 to 18
- Language: French
- Website: http://www.lftamatave.mg/

Lycée Français de Tamatave is a French international school in Toamasina, Madagascar.

== History and operations ==
It serves école maternelle (preschool) through lycée (senior high school).

The school was established in 1973.

== See also ==
- Education in Madagascar
- List of international schools
- French people in Madagascar
- List of international schools in Madagascar
