= Lycée La Clairefontaine =

French international school in Madagascar

Lycée Privé La Clairefontaine, also known as the Collège La Clairefontaine or the École La Clairefontaine, is a private French international school, serving preschool through senior high school, with campuses in the Antananarivo area and in Tôlanaro (Fort-Dauphin) in Madagascar.

The main campus serves until senior high school, As of 2018 the Fort Dauphin campus only goes to junior high.

The school has multiple campuses in the Antananarivo: primary schools in Ivandry, Mandrosoa, and Talatamaty, junior highs in Ambodivoanjo and Antsahabe, and a senior high in Ambodivoanjo. The school also has an annex in Tôlanaro which served junior and senior high school.

== History ==
Madame Gabrielle Radavidra established the school, which opened in 1982 with a campus in Ivandry. The AEFE began recognising the school in 1994.

The Fort-Dauphin annex was established as the result of an agreement with QIT Madagascar Minerals S.A or QMM SA that was signed on 22 April 2005; it opened in September of that year. As of 2018 it had about 263 students. The Fort-Dauphin campus began its senior high classes in 2010, and the junior high ones were recognised by AEFE that year.

== See also ==
- French people in Madagascar
