= Sedera Randriamparany =

Malagasy footballer

Personal information
- Full name: Sedera Mathieu Randriamparany
- Date of birth: May 3, 1990 (age 36)
- Place of birth: Ambohijafy, Madagascar
- Position: Defender

Team information
- Current team: Ajesaia

Senior career*
Years	Team	Apps	(Gls)
2007–2011	Ajesaia		
2012–2014	Saint-Pauloise FC		
2015–2021	Saint-Pierroise		

International career^{‡}
2007–2010	Madagascar	17	(0)
- * Club domestic league appearances and goals as of July 28, 2014 ‡ National team caps and goals as of July 28, 2014

Sedera Mathieu Randriamparany (born May 3, 1990) is a Malagasy footballer who played for Ajesaia and for Saint-Pauloise FC and JS Saint-Pierroise in Réunion. He also played international football for Madagascar.
