= Lycée Français de Tananarive =

French international school in Antananarivo, Madagascar

Coordinates: 18.8760°S 47.5610°E

Location
- Antananarivo; Madagascar

Information
- School type: International School
- Language: French
- Website: https://www.egd.mg/

Écoles et Lycée Français de Tananarive, or Lycée Français de Tananarive (LFT), is a French international school in Antananarivo, Madagascar. It serves levels primary school through lycée (senior high school). It serves a total of 3,000 students in four primary school campuses and one junior-senior high school campus.

It is directly operated by the Agency for French Education Abroad (AEFE), an agency of the French government.

== Campuses ==
As of 2015 the junior-senior high school campus as 1,679 students. The four primary school campuses are School A Ampefiloha, School B Ampandrianomby, School C Ambohibao, and School D Analamahitsy: In 2015 they had 381, 463, 247, and 191 students, respectively.

The senior high school has a boarding programme.

School D Les Charmilles is along National Route 3, in proximity to the secondary campus. School D will be at one point relocated to Ivandry.

== See also ==
- French people in Madagascar
- List of international schools in Madagascar
