= Andramasina =

- Location in Madagascar
- Coordinates: 18.47°S 47.28°E
- Country: Madagascar
- Region: Analamanga
- District: Andramasina

Population (2018)Census
  - Total: 16,149
- Time zone: UTC3 (EAT)
- postal code: 106

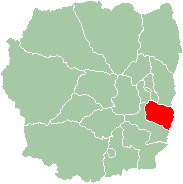
Antananarivo Andramasina

For other localities in Madagascar with the same name, please check: Andramasina (disambiguation)

Andramasina is a town in Analamanga Region, in the Central Highlands of Madagascar 62 km north-west of Antananrivo. It is the administrative capital of Andramasina District.

== Lakes & Rivers ==
- Lake Ambohimanjaka
- Sisaony river
