= Ambohitrandriamanitra =

- Location in Madagascar
- Coordinates: 19°5′S 47°47′E
- Country: Madagascar
- Region: Analamanga
- District: Manjakandriana
- Elevation: 1,424 m (4,672 ft)

Population (2001)
  - Total: 8,000
- Time zone: UTC3 (EAT)

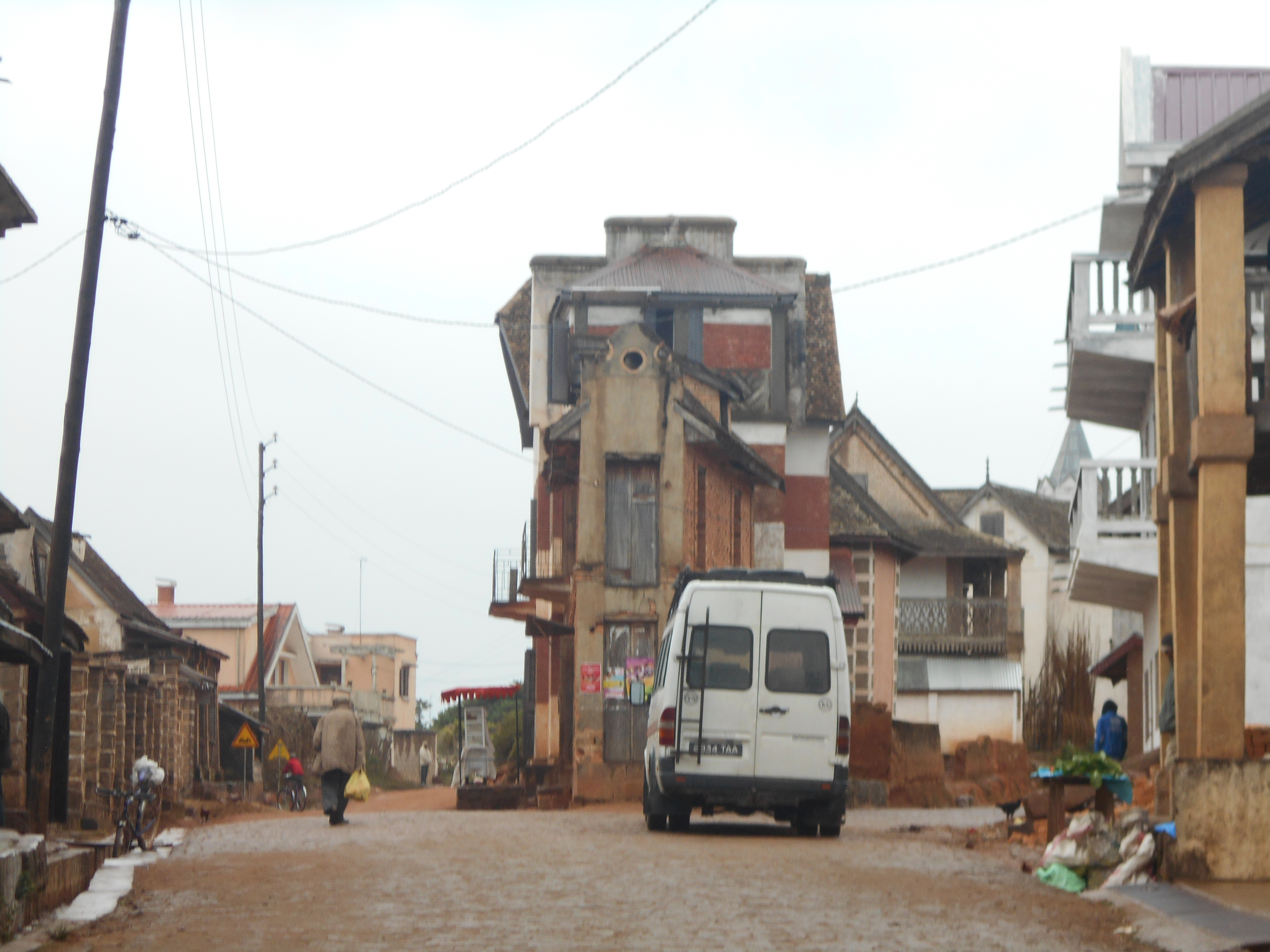

Ambohitrandriamanitra is a town and commune in Madagascar. It belongs to the district of Manjakandriana, which is a part of Analamanga Region. The population of the commune was estimated to be approximately 8,000 in 2001 commune census.

Primary and junior level secondary education are available in town. The majority 87% of the population of the commune are farmers. The most important crops are rice and beans, while other important agricultural products are cassava and potatoes. Industry and services provide employment for 1% and 12% of the population, respectively.
