= Andramasina District =

Andramasina (district)
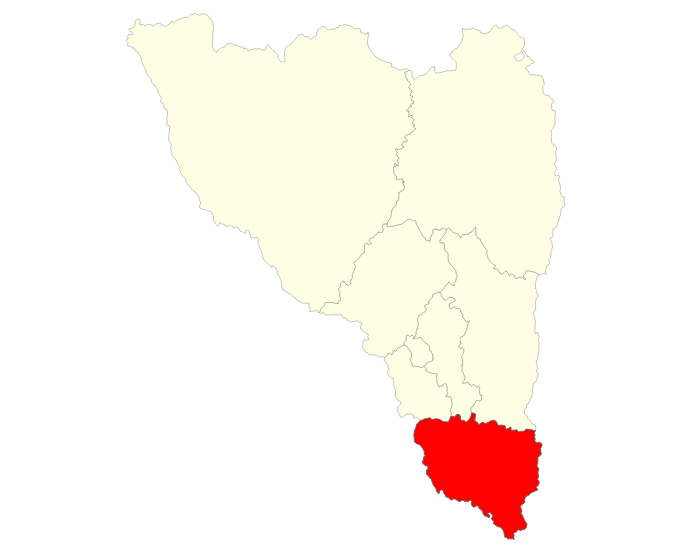
- Map of Andramasina location in Analamanga

- Location in Madagascar
- Coordinates: 18.47°S 47.28°E
- Country: Madagascar
- Region: Analamanga
- District: Andramasina

Area
  - Total: 1,416 km^{2} (547 sq mi)

Population (2018)Census
  - Total: 234,872
- Time zone: UTC3 (EAT)
- postal code: 106

Andramasina is a district of Analamanga in Madagascar.

== Communes ==
The district is further divided into 14 communes:

- Abohimiadana
- Alarobia Vatosola
- Alatsinainy Bakaro
- Andohariana
- Andramasina
- Anjoma Faliarivo
- Anosibe Trimoloharano
- Antotohazo, Andramasina
- Fitsinjovana Bakaro
- Mandrosoa
- Morarano Soafiraisana
- Sabotsy Ambohitromby
- Sabotsy Manjakavahoaka
- Tankafatra
