= Antananarivo-Atsimondrano District =

Antananarivo-Atsimondrano
- District
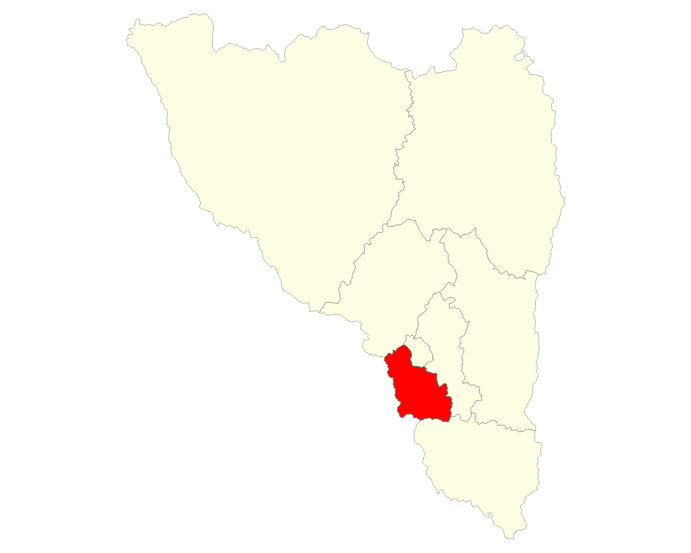
- Atsimondrano district, located within the Analamanga region.

- Location within Madagascar
- Coordinates: 18°55′39″S 47°36′41″E
- Country: Madagascar
- Region: Analamanga

Area
  - Total: 422.0 km^{2} (162.9 sq mi)

Population (2020)
  - Total: 699,348
  - Density: 1,538.6/km^{2} (3,985/sq mi)
- Postal code: 102

Antananarivo-Atsimondrano is a district of Analamanga in Madagascar. It covers the outskirts of Antananarivo, and its postal code is 102. The district has an area of 422.0 km^{2} (162.9 sq mi), and the estimated population in 2020 was 699,348.

== Communes ==
The district is further divided into 26 communes:

- Alakamisy Fenoarivo
- Alatsinainy Ambazaha
- Ambalavao
- Ambatofahavalo
- Ambavahaditokana
- Ambohidrapeto
- Ambohijanaka
- Ampahitrosy
- Ampanefy
- Ampitatafika
- Andoharanofotsy
- Andranonahoatra
- Androhibe Antsahadinta
- Ankadimanga
- Ankaraobato
- Anosizato Andrefana
- Antanetikely
- Bemasoandro
- Bongatsara
- Fenoarivo
- Fiombonana
- Itaosy
- Soalandy
- Soavina
- Tanjombato
- Tsiafahy
