= Collèges de France =

French international school in Antananarivo, Madagascar

Collèges de France is a French international school in Antananarivo, Madagascar.

It serves preschool through senior high school as well as professional levels.

It has three campuses: Amparibe, Ankadilalana, and Ambohijatovo. The Ankadilalana campus serves all grade levels.

It was formerly Collège de France.

== See also ==
- French people in Madagascar
