= Lycée Français Sadi Carnot =

International school in Madagascar

Lycée Français Sadi Carnot (English: /kɑːrˈnoʊ/ kar-NOH, French: [lise kaʁno]), also known as Collège français Sadi Carnot or the Lycée Français Diego Suarez (LFDS), is a French international school in Antsiranana (Diego Suarez), Madagascar. It currently serves preschool (maternelle) through junior high school (collège). It previously served preschool through senior high school.

The government of Madagascar designated the site as a French school on 7 August 1973, and it opened in September 1973, due to the Malagasization of the local school system. The older buildings use a Creole style.

== See also ==
- Demographics of Madagascar
