= Manjakandriana District =

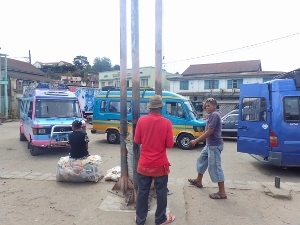
- station taxi-brousses Manjakandriana

- Location in Madagascar
- Coordinates: 18°33′S 47°28′E
- Country: Madagascar
- Region: Analamanga
- District: Manjakandriana

Area
  - Total: 1,718 km^{2} (663 sq mi)
- Elevation: 1,450 m (4,760 ft)

Population (2018)
  - Total: 449,578
- Time zone: UTC3 (EAT)
- postal code: 116

Manjakandriana District is a district in central Madagascar. It is part of Analamanga Region. Its capital is Manjakandriana.

== Communes ==
The district is further divided into 23 communes:

- Alarobia
- Ambanitsena
- Ambatolaona
- Ambatomanga, Manjakandriana
- Ambatomena, Manjakandriana
- Ambohibary, Manjakandriana
- Ambohitrandriamanitra
- Ambohitrolomahitsy
- Ambohitrony
- Ambohitseheno
- Anjepy
- Anjoma Betoho
- Ankazondandy
- Antsahalalina
- Manjakandriana
- Mantasoa
- Merikanjaka
- Miadanandriana
- Nandihizana
- Ranovao
- Sadabe
- Sambaina
- Soavinandriana, Manjakandriana
