= Sisaony =

Location
- Country: Madagascar
- Region: Analamanga
- Cities: Andramasina, Ambatofotsy, Ampitatafika

Physical characteristics
- Source
  - elevation: 1,770 m (5,810 ft)
- Mouth: Ikopa River
  - location: Mahitsy
  - coordinates: 18°45′S 47°21′E
  - elevation: 1250 m
- Length: 100 km (62 mi)
- Basin size: 740 km²

Basin features
- River system: Ikopa River

The Sisaony is a smaller river in Analamanga, Madagascar. It drains the districts of Antananarivo Atsimondrano and Andramasina, in the central Highlands of Madagascar into the Ikopa River. Via the Betsiboka River its waters reach the Indian Ocean.

== Waterfalls ==
At the entry of Andramasina there is a fall of 30-40m.
