= Ikopa River =

River in Madagascar

Coordinates: 16°47′55″S 46°51′20″E

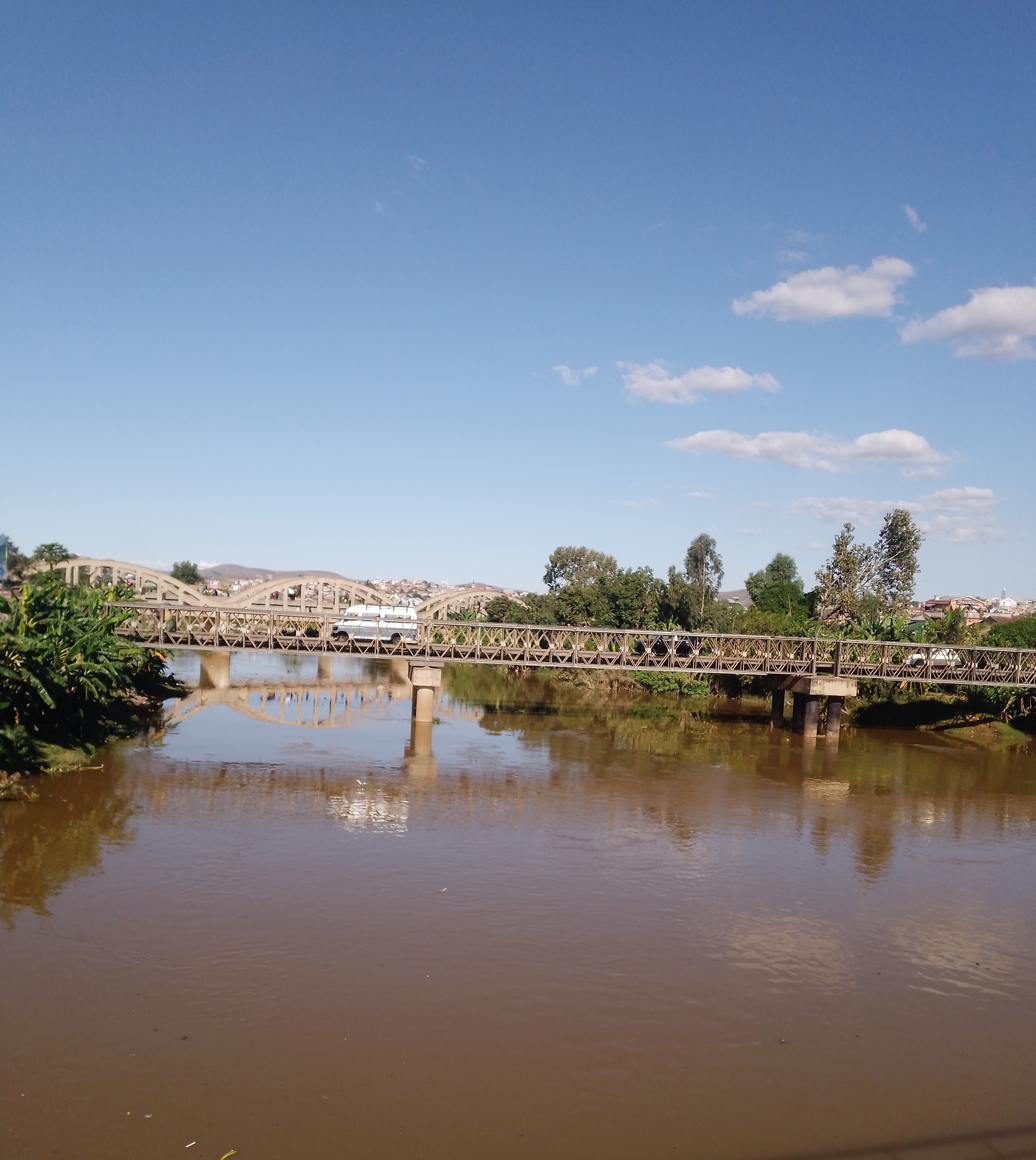
Ikopa river at Tanjombato Ikopa River with pirogues, Antananarivo, 1865

The Ikopa River is the second longest waterway in Madagascar and passes through the capital, Antananarivo. It is the largest tributary of the Betsiboka River. It is formed by the Varahina-North and Varahina-South Rivers.

Its spring, named Varahina, is found in the sub-prefecture of Andramasina at an altitude of 1810 meters.

On this river is situated one of the largest hydro-electrical power stations of Madagascar: the Antelomita Hydroelectric Power Station.
