= Central Highlands (Madagascar) =

Biogeographical region in Central Madagascar

Coordinates: 20°S 47°E

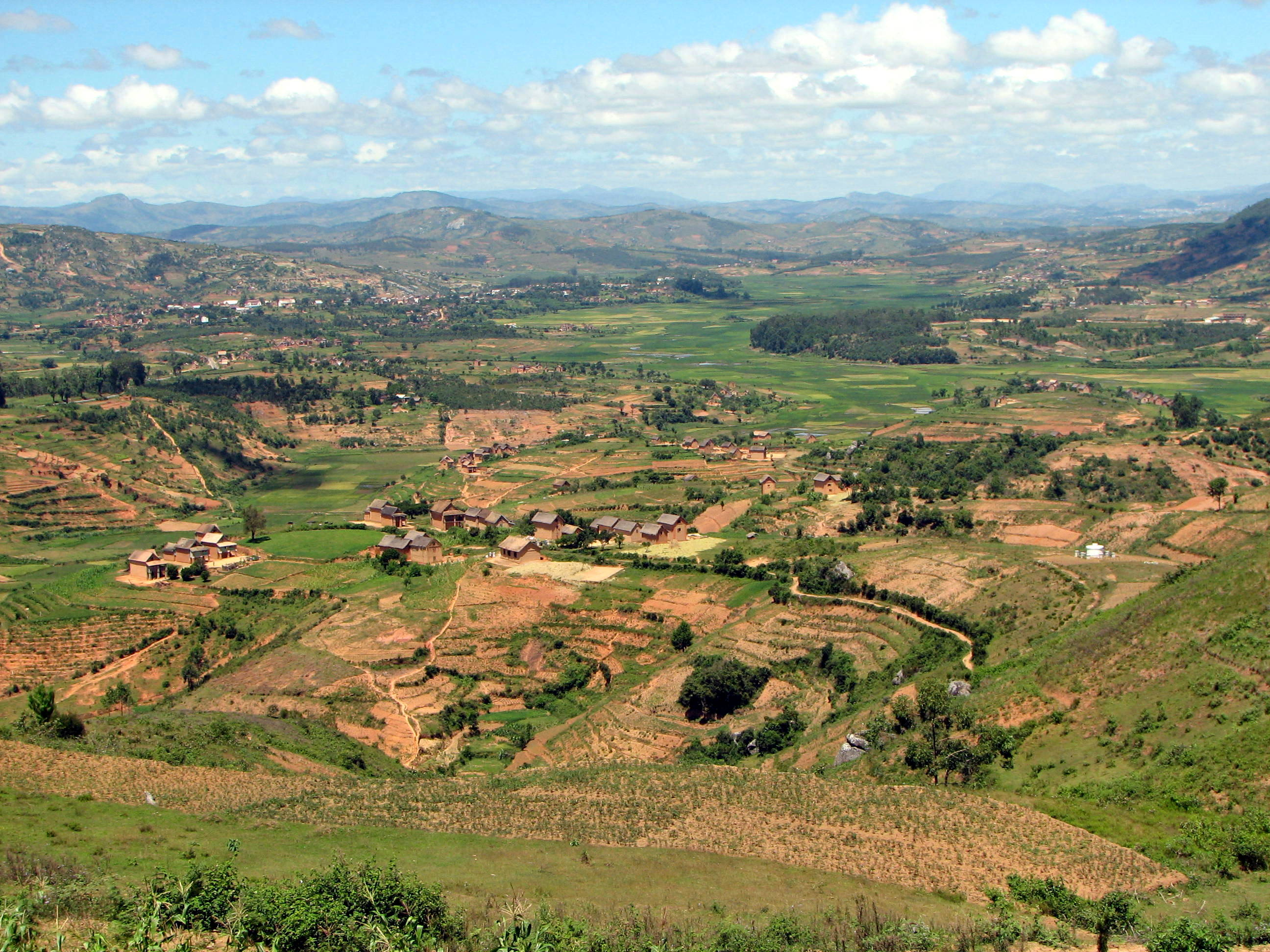
Landscape in the Central Highlands region

The Copentral Highlands, Central High Plateau, or Hautes-Terres are a mountainous biogeographical region in central Madagascar. They include the contiguous part of the island's interior above 800 m (2,600 ft) elevation. The Central Highlands are separated from the Northern Highlands of the northern tip of Madagascar by a low-lying valley, the Mandritsara Window, which has apparently acted as a barrier to dispersal for species in the highlands, leading to species pairs such as Voalavo gymnocaudus and Voalavo antsahabensis in the Northern and Central Highlands. Species restricted to the Central Highlands include the bats Miniopterus manavi and Miniopterus sororculus; the rodents Brachyuromys betsileoensis and Voalavo antsahabensis; the tenrecs Hemicentetes nigriceps and Oryzorictes tetradactylus; and the lemur Cheirogaleus sibreei. Because of the continuous habitat of the Central Highlands, there is little local endemism, unlike the Northern Highlands.

== Gallery ==
Photographs - Central highlands

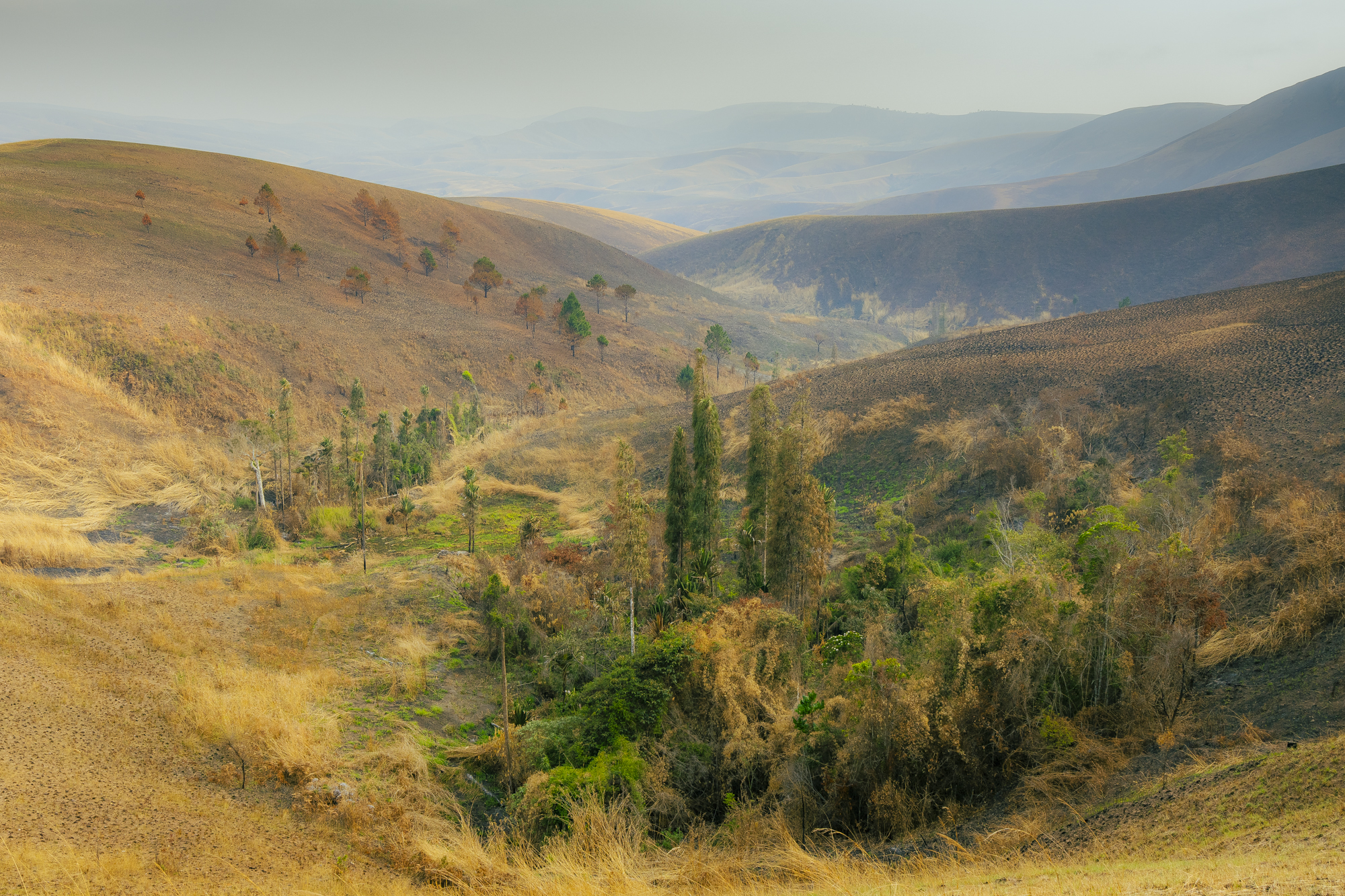
Central highlands near Ambohitantely at the end of the dry season.

== See also ==
- Madagascar subhumid forests
