= Analamanga =

Analamanga Region
- Region
- Location in Madagascar
- Coordinates: 18°56′24″S 47°31′12″E
- Country: Madagascar
- Capital: Antananarivo

Government
  - Type
  - Governor: Clémence Raharinirina

Area
  - Total: 17,488 km^{2} (6,752 sq mi)

Population (2018)
  - Total: 4,325,226
  - Density: 247.33/km^{2} (640.57/sq mi)
- Time zone: UTC+3 (EAT)
- HDI (2018): 0.633 medium · 1st of 22
- Website: gouvernoratanalamanga.mg

Analamanga is a region in central Madagascar, containing the capital Antananarivo and its surrounding metropolitan area. The region has an area of 17,488 square kilometres (6,752 square miles), and had a population of 4,325,226 in 2018.

== Administrative divisions ==
Analamanga Region is divided into eight districts, which are sub-divided into 140 communes.

- Ambohidratrimo District - 24 communes
- Andramasina District - 14 communes
- Anjozorobe District - 18 communes
- Ankazobe District - 15 communes
- Antananarivo-Atsimondrano District - 26 communes
- Antananarivo-Avaradrano District - 16 communes
- Antananarivo-Renivohitra District - 1 commune; the city of Antananarivo
- Manjakandriana District - 23 communes

== Geography ==
The region extends mainly towards the north of the capital. It is bordered by Betsiboka to the north, Bongolava and Itasy to the west, Alaotra Mangoro to the east, and Vakinankaratra to the south.

=== Rivers ===
The main rivers are the Betsiboka River and the Ikopa River.

=== Major lakes ===
Lake Mantasoa (1375 ha) and Tsiazompaniry (2333 ha).

== Transport ==
=== Roads ===
The capital, Antananarivo is linked with several national roads:

- National Road 2 leads eastwards to Toamasina
- National Road 4 leads northwards to Mahajunga and Diego Suarez.
- National Road 7 leads southwards to Antsirabe and Fianarantsoa.
- National Road 1 leads westwards to Tsiroanomandidy and Maintirano.

=== Airport ===
- Antananarivo airport

== Railroads ==
Two railroad lines exist, though there is no passenger transport: the line to Antsirabe (158 km), and the line to Toamasina (371km).

== Protected Areas ==
- Anjozorobe-Angavo Reserve
- Ambohitantely Reserve.

== Sports ==
- COSPN Analamanga - basketball
- ASSM Elgeco Plus - football, Malagasy champions 1971, 1978
- USJF Ravinala - football
- AS Saint Michel - football
- BTM Antananarivo - football
- COSFAP Antananarivo - football, Malagasy champions 1988
- DSA Antananarivo - football, Malagasy champions 1997 and 1998
- Tana FC Formation - football
- AS Adema - football, Malagasy champions 2002, 2006, 2012, 2021
- Japan Actuel's FC - football, Malagasy champions in 2011
- Ajesaia - football, Malagasy champions in 2007 and 2009
- SO Emyrne - football, Malagasy champions in 2001

== See also ==
- Antananarivo Province
