= List of power stations in Madagascar =

The following page lists all power stations in Madagascar. The list is not complete.

== Hydroelectric ==
=== Operational ===
Hydroelectric station	Community	Coordinates	River	Type	Name of reservoir	Capacity (MW)	Year completed
Andekaleka Hydroelectric Power Station	Andekaleka		Vohitra River	Gravity	N/A	91 MW	1982, 2012
Antelomita Hydroelectric Power Station	Anjeva Gara		Ikopa River	Gravity	N/A	8.4 MW	1930, 1952, 1953
Farahantsana Hydroelectric Power Station	Mahitsy		Ikopa River	Gravity	N/A	28 MW	2022
Mandraka Power Station	Mandraka		Mandraka River	Gravity	Lake Mandraka	24 MW	1956
Ankevirato Hydroelectric Power Station	Tsarazaza		Rianamboa River	Gravity		560 kW	2023

=== Under construction ===
Hydroelectric station	Community	Coordinates	Fuel type	Capacity	Year completed	Name of owner	Notes
Volobe Hydroelectric Power Station	Ambodilazana		Water power	120 MW	2027	Compagnie générale d’hydroélectricité de Volobe (CGHV)	

=== Proposed ===
Hydroelectric station	Community	Coordinates	River	Type	Name of reservoir	Capacity (MW)	Year completed
Antetezambato Central	Ambatofinandrahana District	Under construction, previewed 2030	Mania	Gravity	20°14′S 46°37′E	140 MW	(projected 2030)
Sahofika Hydroelectric Power Station	Sahofika		Onive River	Gravity	Sahofika Reservoir	205 MW	2024 (expected)
Antananarivo Mixed Hydrosolar Power Station	Antananarivo			Run of river	N/A	35 MW	2026 (expected)
Ranomafana Hydroelectric Power Station	Ranomafana (95 km northwest of Antananarivo)	-18°36’35.9S，47°1’13.27 E	Ikopa River	Gravity		2×32 MW = 64 MW	202? (expected)

== Thermal ==
=== Operational ===
Thermal power station	Community	Coordinates	Fuel type	Capacity	Year completed	Name of owner	Notes
Ambohimanambola Thermal power station	Ambohimanambola		Heavy fuel oil	105 MW (7×15 MW)	2024	Jirama (state financed)	operated by Aksaf Power
Mandroseza Power Plant	Antananarivo		Heavy fuel oil	40 MW	202?	Symbion Power Mandroseza SA	
Noor I Thermal Power Station	Antananarivo		Heavy fuel oil	48 MW	2018	Jovena	
Noor II Thermal Power Station	Antananarivo		Heavy fuel oil	28 MW	2018	Jovena	
Andaingo Thermal Power Station	Andaingo		Biomass	75 MW	2012	CIRAD	

== Solar ==
Solar power station	Community	Coordinates	Fuel type	Capacity	Year completed	Name of owner	Notes
Ambatolampy Solar Power Station	Ambatolampy		Solar	40 MW	April 2022	Ambatolampy Solar Consortium	
Access Solar Power Station	Antananarivo		Solar	25 MW	2025 Expected	Access Power	
Centrale Solaire d’Andranotakatra	Belobaka, Mahajanga II	12 MW Solar central	Solar	1.25 MW	2022		
Centrale solaire de Kalampo	Kalampo (Nosy Be)		Solar	3 MW	April 2026	Groupe Filatex	3MW operational
Centrale Solaire d’Ambavahadinilakaka (Ihorombe)	Ambavahadinilakaka	470 kW Solar central	Solar	470 kW	2022	Maherlla	
Mangatany	RIA Antananarivo		Solar	9,5 MW	Dezember 2025	Jirama	2.5 MW operational
Sambava Solar Power Station	Sambava		Solar	500 kW	March 2022	Green Energy Solutions	

== Hybrid ==
Solar power station	Community	Coordinates	Fuel type	Capacity	Year completed	Name of owner	Notes
Ambanja	Ambanja		Solar+ fuel generators (hybride)	825 kWc	August 2025		
Kimony Solar Hybride Central	Bemanonga, Menabe		Solar + thermal	1.4 MW operative, 3 MW projected	2022 (1.4 MW operative)	Green Energy Solutions (GES) + Jirama	
Sava Hybride Power Station	Sambava, Antalaha, Vohemar		Solar + thermal	8 MW thermal + 5 MW solar		Green Yellow	
Tanambao Verrerie Solar-hybride central	Tanambao Verrerie, Toamasina		Solar + thermal	18 MW	2021	Jirama	
Toliara Centrale Energetique	Besinjaka (Tulear)		Thermal + solar	9 MW thermal + 2.9 MW solar		Filatex Energy	

== See also ==
- List of largest power stations in the world
- List of power stations in Africa
- Jirama - the state's power supply company
