= Mandraka Falls =

- Location within Madagascar
- Coordinates: 18°55′16″S 47°55′46″E
- Total height: 30 metres (98 ft)

The Mandraka Falls are a small set of waterfalls on the Mandraka River, approximately 65 kilometres (40 mi) from Antananarivo, the capital of Madagascar. Their total drop is only about 30 metres (98 ft).

The falls are used as a source of hydroelectric power for the Mandraka Dam, and the power station there has been supplied by the Mantasoa Dam since 1956.

== See also ==
- List of waterfalls
