= Ambatolampy Solar Power Station =

Solar farm in Madagascar

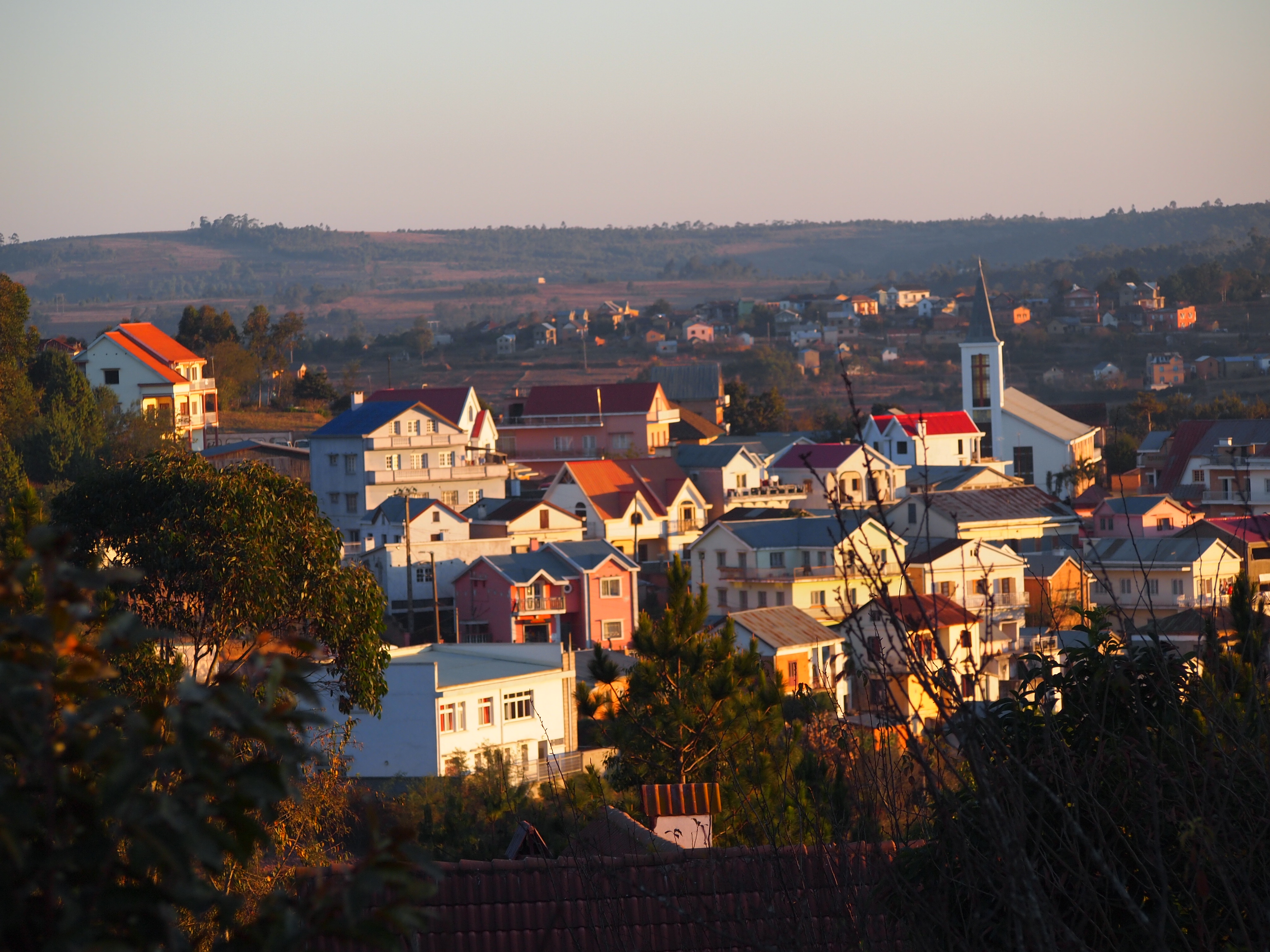
- Official name: Ambatolampy Solar Power Plant
- Country: Madagascar
- Location: Ambatolampy, Vakinankaratra Region
- Coordinates: 19°24′26″S 47°25′46″E
- Status: Operational
- Commission date: 2018
- Owner: Ambatolampy Solar Consortium
- Operator: Ambatolampy Solar Consortium

Solar farm
- Type: Flat-panel PV

Power generation
- Nameplate capacity: 40 MW (54,000 hp)

The Ambatolampy Solar Power Station is a 40 MW solar power plant in Madagascar. As of April 2022, it was the first grid-connected, privately-funded solar power plant in the country. The power plant, which was first commissioned in 2018, underwent expansion from 20 MW to 40 MW, between 2021 and 2022. The off-taker of the power generated at this renewable energy power plant is Jirama, the national electricity utility company.

== Location ==
The power station is located in the town of Ambatolampy, in the Vakinankaratra Region of Madagascar. Ambatolampy is located approximately 98 kilometres (61 mi) by road, northeast of Antsirabe, the regional capital city. This is approximately 73 kilometres (45 mi) by road, south of Antananarivo, the country's capital and largest city.

== Overview ==
Madagascar had installed generation capacity of 969 megawatts as of 2021. Only 2 percent was sourced from solar energy, with the rest sourced from fossil fuel sources. Ambatolampy Solar Power Station is the first and at that time was the largest grid-connected solar power plant in the country. It represents the initial efforts to diversify the country's generation mix.

== Ownership ==
The power station is owned by a consortium comprising (a) GreenYellow, a French IPP and a member of the Casino Group and (b) the Axian Group, a Madagascan investment conglomerate. The owners/developers have established a special purpose vehicle (SPV) company to own, develop, fund, build, operate and maintain the power station. For descriptive purposes, we will call the SPV company Ambatolampy Solar Consortium. The table below, illustrates the shareholding in Ambatolampy Solar Consortium.

Shareholding in Ambatolampy Solar Consortium
Rank	Shareholder	Domicile	Percentage	Notes
1	Axian Group	Madagascar	51.0	
2	GreenYellow	France	49.0	
	Total		100.0	

In February 2024, Axian Group acquired the 49 percent shareholding in this power station previously owned by GreenYellow. Axian now owns 100 percent of project's stock shares.

== Expansion ==
The original power station with generation capacity of 20 megawatts, was commercially commissioned in 2021. That phase of development received funding from (a) Société Générale (b) GuarantCo (a subsidiary of the Private Infrastructure Development Group (PIDG) (c) Banque Malgache de l'Océan Indien (BMOI) and (d) Banque Nationale d'Investissement (BNI) (National Investment Bank) of Madagascar.

Beginning in June 2021, the developers/owners of the power station began the expansion of the solar farm from 20 MW to 40 MW in generation capacity. This phase included the addition of a 5MW/5MWh battery storage system to stabilize the national electricity grid. This phase cost €17 million (US$$20.33 million) and received funding from (a) Société Générale (b) GuarantCo and (c) the African Guarantee Fund.

== See also ==
- List of power stations in Madagascar
