= Satrandroy =

Coordinates: 18°05′S 48°59′E

- Location in Madagascar
- Country: Madagascar
- Region: Atsinanana
- District: Toamasina II
- Established: 2014

Population (2019)Census
  - Total: 6,665
- Time zone: UTC3 (EAT)
- Postal code: 501

Satrandroy is a rural commune in the district of Toamasina II (district), in the region of Atsinanana, on the east coast of Madagascar. It is a relatively new municipality that gained its status only in 2015.

Access to this municimality is difficult being without road access. The construction of a road of 45 km between Satrandroy and Ambodilazana until Fito Sahaviavy is presently undertaken by the villagers themselves.

== Economy ==
The economy is based on agriculture. Rice, manioc & corn are grown, other crops are lychee, cloves, cacao, coffee, papaya, banana and sugar cane.
