= Tsiazompaniry Dam =

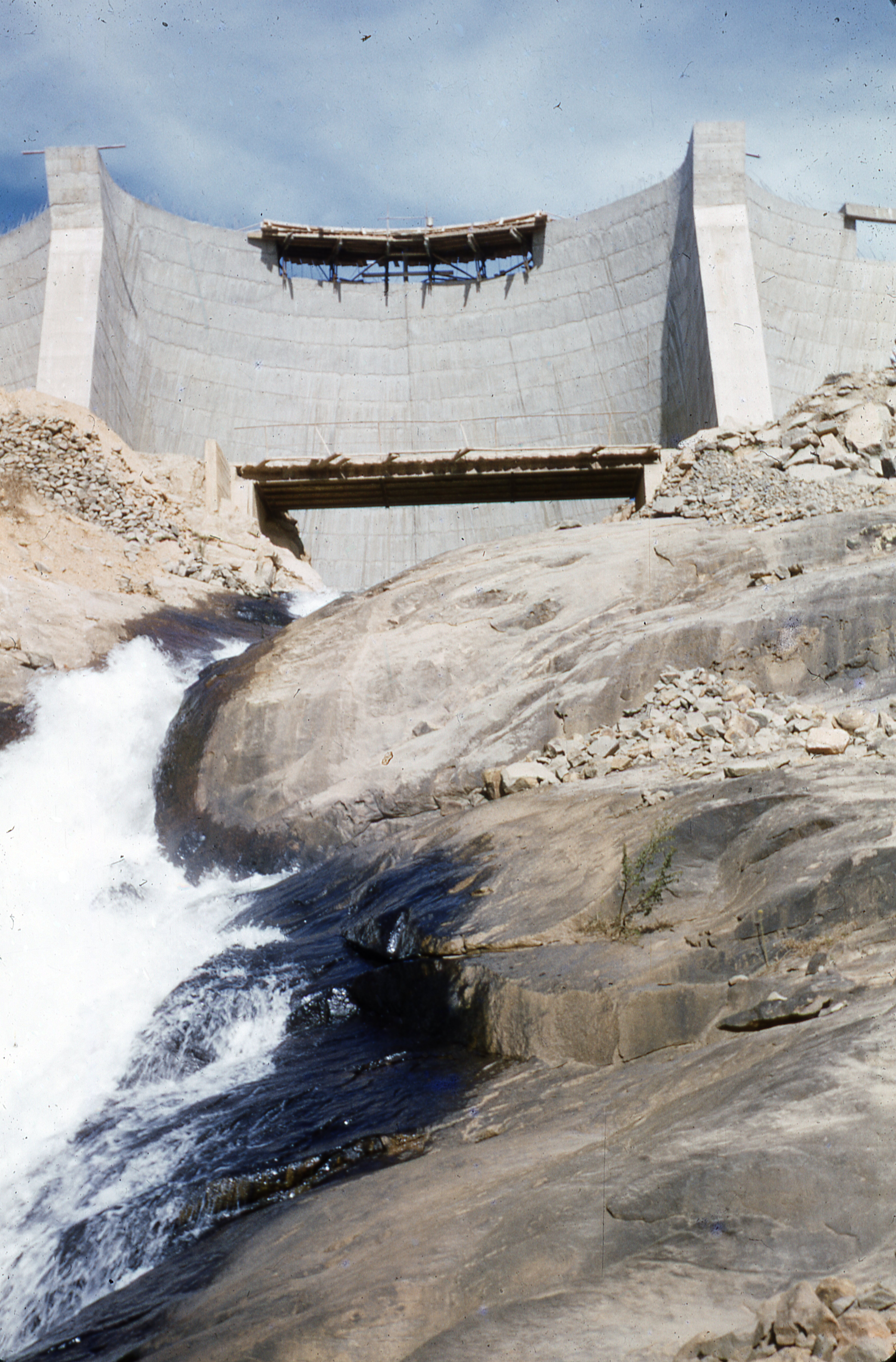
- Tsiazompaniry Dam

- Location within Madagascar
- Country: Madagascar
- Location: Tsiazompaniry, Analamanga Region
- Coordinates: 19°15′16.68″S 47°50′44.56″E
- Purpose: Power, water supply
- Status: Operational
- Opening date: 1956; 70 years ago
- Owner: Jirama

Dam and spillways
- Type of dam: Buttress
- Impounds: Varahina-South River
- Height: 27 m (89 ft)

Reservoir
- Total capacity: 260,000,000 m^{3} (210,000 acre⋅ft)
- Surface area: 31 km^{2} (12 mi^{2})

The Tsiazompaniry Dam is a buttress dam on the Varahina-South River, a tributary of the Ikopa River, near Tsiazompaniry in the Analamanga Region of Madagascar. The dam was constructed by a French firm in 1956. It creates Lake Tsiazompaniry, the largest reservoir in the country, which has a surface area of 31 km^{2} (12 mi^{2}) and a storage volume of 260,000,000 m^{3} (210,000 acre⋅ft). A second buttress dam, 1 km (0.62 mi) northwest of the main dam helps withhold the reservoir. Water released from the dam supplies a regulated flow to hydroelectric power station at the Antelomita Dam downstream. Efforts to install a 5.25 MW power station at the base of the dam began in 2011.

== See also ==
- Mantasoa Dam – on the Varahina North River
