= Volobe Hydroelectric Power Station =

Power station in Madagascar

Volobe Power Station
- Map of Madagascar showing the location of Volobe Hydroelectric Power Station
- Country: Madagascar
- Location: Volobe, Ambodilazana; Toamasina Rural District
- Coordinates: 18°09′07″S 49°11′06″E
- Purpose: Power
- Status: Proposed
- Construction began: 2023 Expected
- Opening date: 2025 Expected
- Construction cost: €350 million (US$372 million)
- Owner: Compagnie Générale d'Hydroélectricité de Volobe
- Operator: CGHV

Dam and spillways
- Impounds: Ivondro River

Power Station
- Operator: Jirama
- Commission date: 2025 Expected
- Type: Run-of-the-river
- Turbines: Andritz Hydro: 6x20 MW
- Installed capacity: 120 MW (160,000 hp)
- Annual generation: 750 GWh

The Volobe Power Station is a 120 megawatts (160,000 hp) hydroelectric power project under construction in Madagascar.

== Location ==
The power station is constructed in Ambodilazana across the Ivondro River, Toamasina Rural District, near Toamasina. The village of Volobe which will host the power station is located approximately 40 kilometres (25 mi), by road, west of Toamasina, the second-largest city in Madagascar.

== Overview ==
Volobe HPP is a run of river plant with six Francis type generating turbines, each rated at 20 megawatts. Andritz Hydro will supply and install the turbines, for total generating capacity of 120 megawatts.

The consortium that is developing the power station will also build the high voltage evacuation power line that will transmit the energy from this power plant to a point where the energy will enter the national electricity grid. In addition, access roads and other infrastructure will be constructed for the neighboring communities.

== Developers ==
The consortium that owns the power station and is developing it has four shareholder companies as illustrated in the table below. They formed a special purpose vehicle company (SPV) to own, design, build, finance, operate and maintain the power station. The SPV company is called Compagnie Générale d'Hydroélectricité de Volobe (CGHV) (English: General Hydroelectricity Company of Volobe).

Shareholding In General Hydroelectricity Company of Volobe
Rank	Name of Owner	Domicile	Percentage Ownership
1	Jovena (subsidiary of Axian Group)	Madagascar	40.0
2	Scatec	Norway	25.0
3	Africa50	Morocco	25.0
4	Colas Mdagascar	Madagascar	10.0
	Total		100.0

== Construction costs and funding ==
It is estimated that construction will cost approximately €350 million (approx. US$372 million), funded by loans and equity.

== Other considerations ==
The energy generated at this station will supply an estimated 360,000 Madagascan households, with about 2 million inhabitants. During the construction phase, an estimated 1,000 jobs are expected to be created. This power station will increase the population of Madagascar that is connected to grid electricity and propel the country towards the goal of 70 percent nation electrification by 2030.

In June 2023, the Compagnie générale d'hydroélectricité de Volobe (CGHV), which owns the power station signed a 35-year power purchase agreement with Jiro sy rano Malagasy (Jirama), the electricity public utility company of Madagascar.

== See also ==
- List of power stations in Madagascar
- Sahofika Hydroelectric Power Station
