= Mantasoa Dam =

- Location within Madagascar
- Country: Madagascar
- Location: Mantasoa, Analamanga Region
- Coordinates: 19°01′04.39″S 47°50′59.43″E
- Purpose: Power, water supply
- Status: Operational
- Construction began: 1937
- Opening date: 1938; 88 years ago
- Owner: Jirama

Dam and spillways
- Type of dam: Buttress
- Impounds: Varahina-North River
- Height: 20 m (66 ft)
- Length: 122 m (400 ft)

Reservoir
- Creates: Lake Mantasoa
- Total capacity: 125,000,000 m^{3} (101,000 acre⋅ft)
- Surface area: 20 km^{2} (7.7 mi^{2})

Mantasoa Dam is a buttress dam on the Varahina-North River, a tributary of the Ikopa River, near Mantasoa in the Analamanga Region of Madagascar. The dam was constructed by French contractors between 1937 and 1938. It creates Lake Mantasoa which has a surface area of 20 km^{2} (7.7 mi^{2}). The dam itself is made of 8,000 m^{3} (10,000 cu yd) of concrete and has a reinforced buttress design. Water released from the dam supplies a regulated flow to hydroelectric power station at the Antelomita Dams downstream. A saddle dam on the north side of the Mantosoa reservoir regulates water flow into the Mandraka River for the Mandraka Dam downstream.

== See also ==
- Tsiazompaniry Dam – on the Varahina South River
