= Grandidier's dwarf gecko =

Conservation status
- Least Concern (IUCN 3.1)

Scientific classification
- Kingdom: Animalia
- Phylum: Chordata
- Class: Reptilia
- Order: Squamata
- Suborder: Gekkota
- Family: Gekkonidae
- Genus: Lygodactylus
- Species: L. tolampyae

Binomial name
- Lygodactylus tolampyae (Grandidier, 1872)
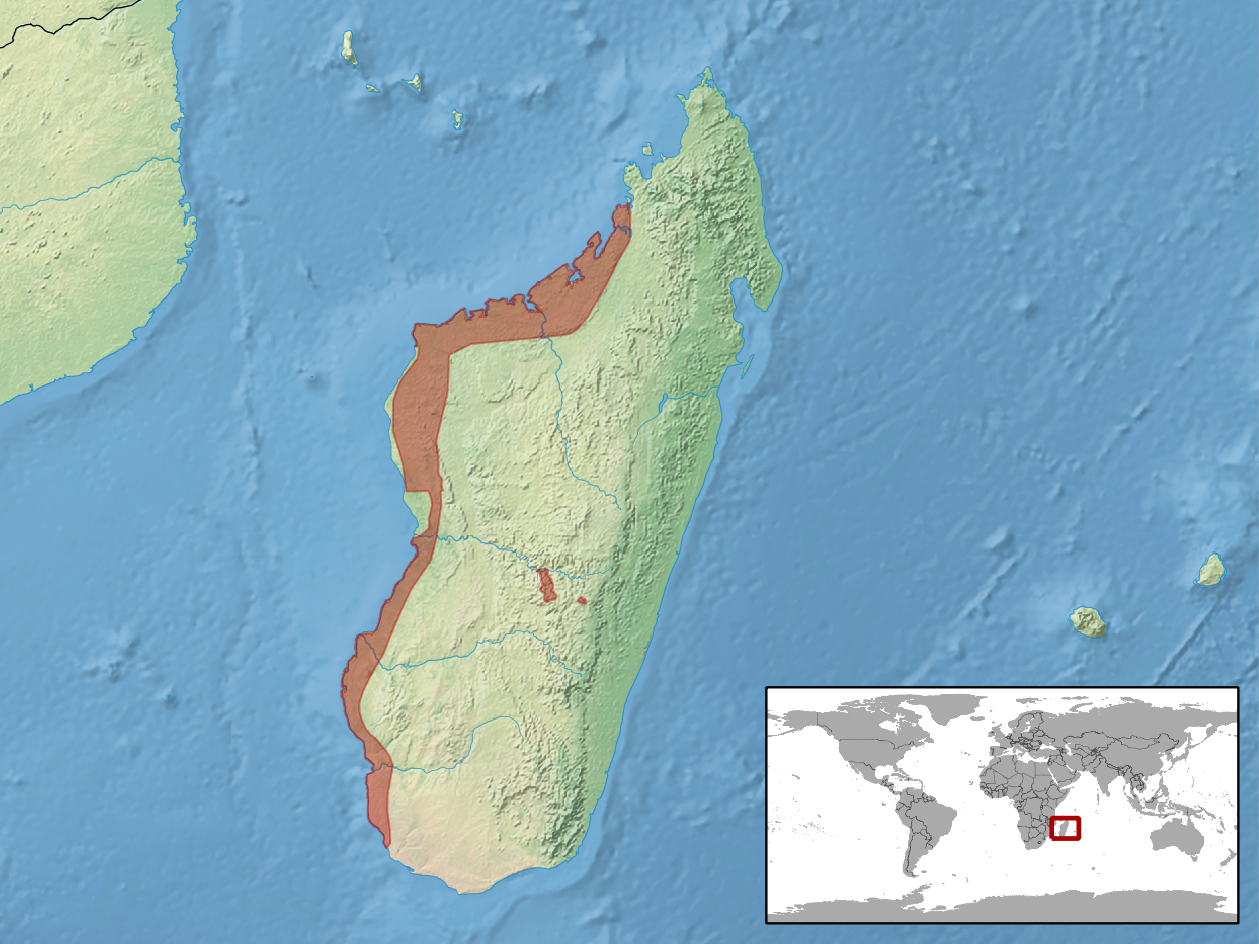

Synonyms
- Hemidactylus tolampyae Grandidier, 1872; Lygodactylus tolampyae — Mocquard, 1909; Lygodactylus tuberifer Boettger, 1913; Lygodactylus (Lygodactylus) tolampyae — Rösler, 2000

Species of lizard

Grandidier's dwarf gecko (Lygodactylus tolampyae) is a species of lizard in the family Gekkonidae. The species is endemic to Madagascar.

== Etymology ==
The specific name, tolampyae, may refer to Ambatolampy, a city in Madagascar. Grandidier gave no explanation.

== Habitat ==
The preferred natural habitat of L. tolampyae is forest, at altitudes from sea level to 1,600 m (5,200 ft).

== Reproduction ==
L. tolampyae is oviparous.
