= Lake Mantasoa =

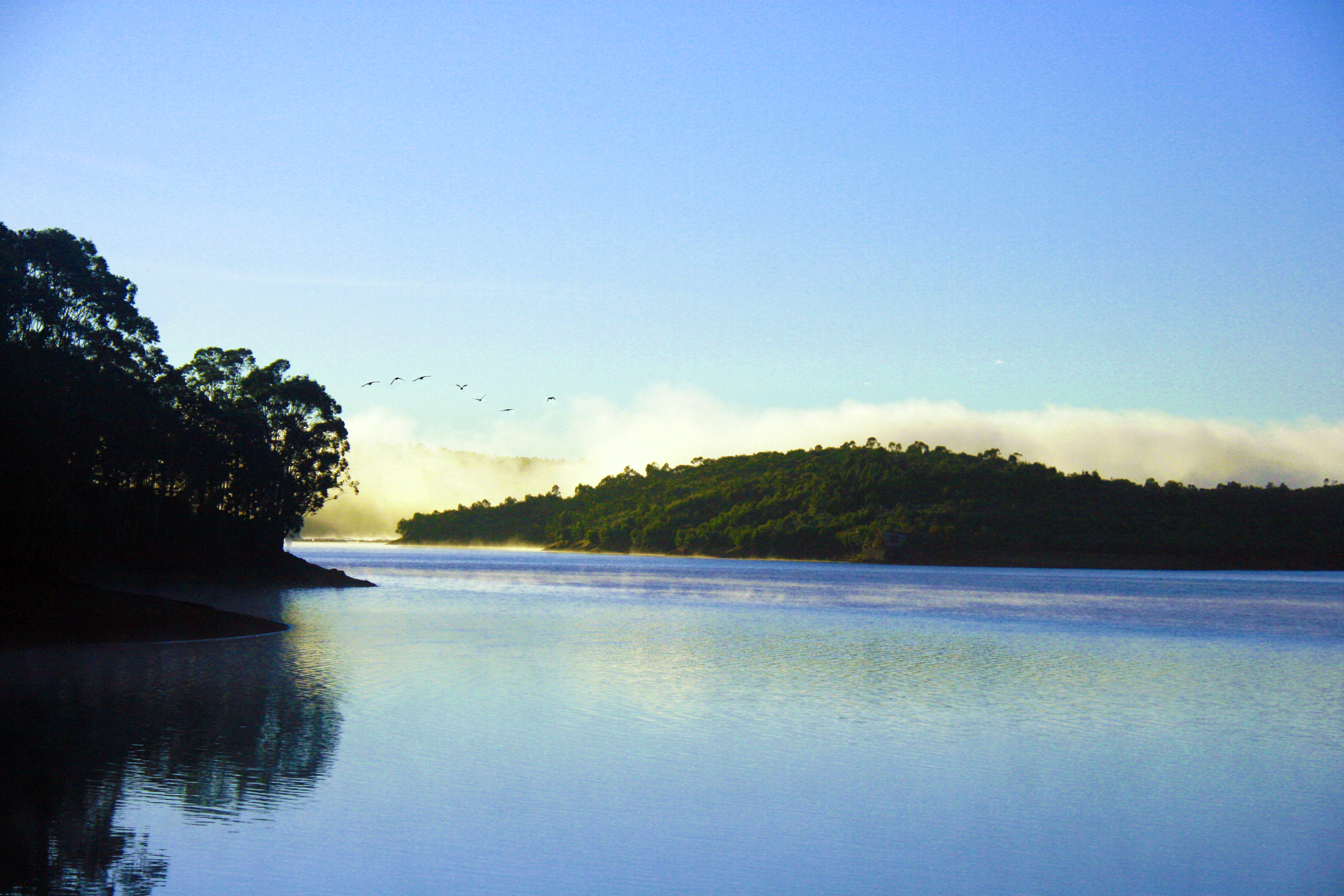
- Sunrise on Lake Mantasoa

- Location within Madagascar
- Location: Analamanga region, Madagascar
- Coordinates: 19.0208°S 47.8599°E
- Type: reservoir
- River sources: Varahina river
- Built: 1936
- Surface area: 20 km^{2} (7.7 mi^{2})
- Surface elevation: 1,397 metres (4,583 ft)
- Settlements: Mantasoa

Lake Mantasoa is a large artificial lake with a surface area of 20.05 km^{2} (7.74 mi^{2}), created by the Mantasoa Dam on the Varahina river (an affluent of the Ikopa) in the municipality of Mantasoa, Analamanga region of Madagascar. It provides immediate irrigation for Betsimitatatra paddies in Analamanga and tabbed water for the capital Antananarivo. The water temperature reaches up to between 13–22 degrees in winter.

The lake's lack of basal microfauna and ferruginous soil provides clear water.

The area prior had been previously researched by Johann Maria Hildebrandt who collected fossils and fauna samples there in middle of 1880.

It is home to one of only two sturgeon farms in the Southern Hemisphere beside the Rio Negro in Uruguay.

== Geography ==
It is situated at 68km east of Antananarivo. The lake is located at an altitude of 1,400 metres.
