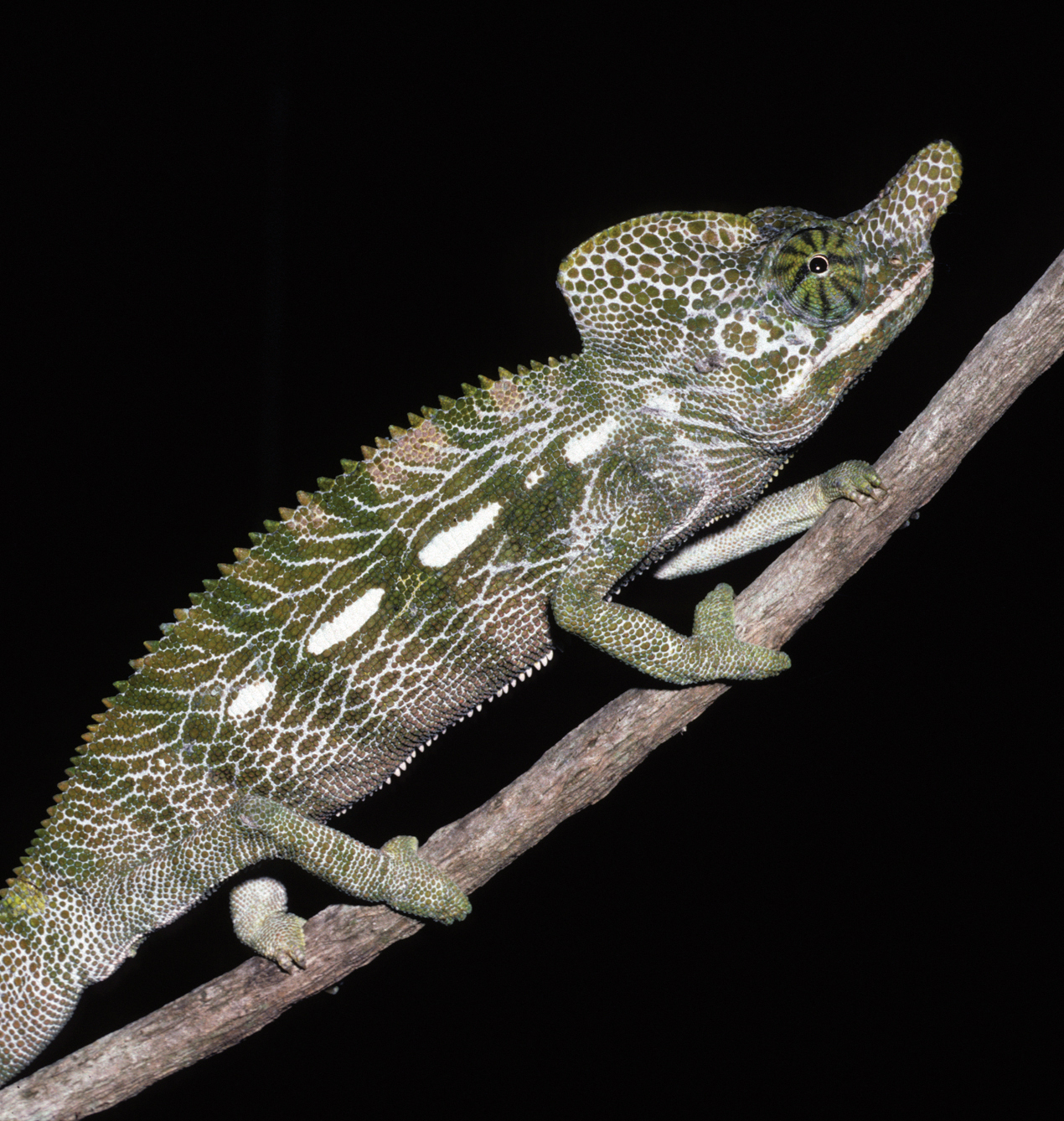
- male

Conservation status
- Vulnerable (IUCN 3.1)

Scientific classification
- Kingdom: Animalia
- Phylum: Chordata
- Class: Reptilia
- Order: Squamata
- Suborder: Iguania
- Family: Chamaeleonidae
- Genus: Furcifer
- Species: F. labordi

Binomial name
- Furcifer labordi (Grandidier, 1872)
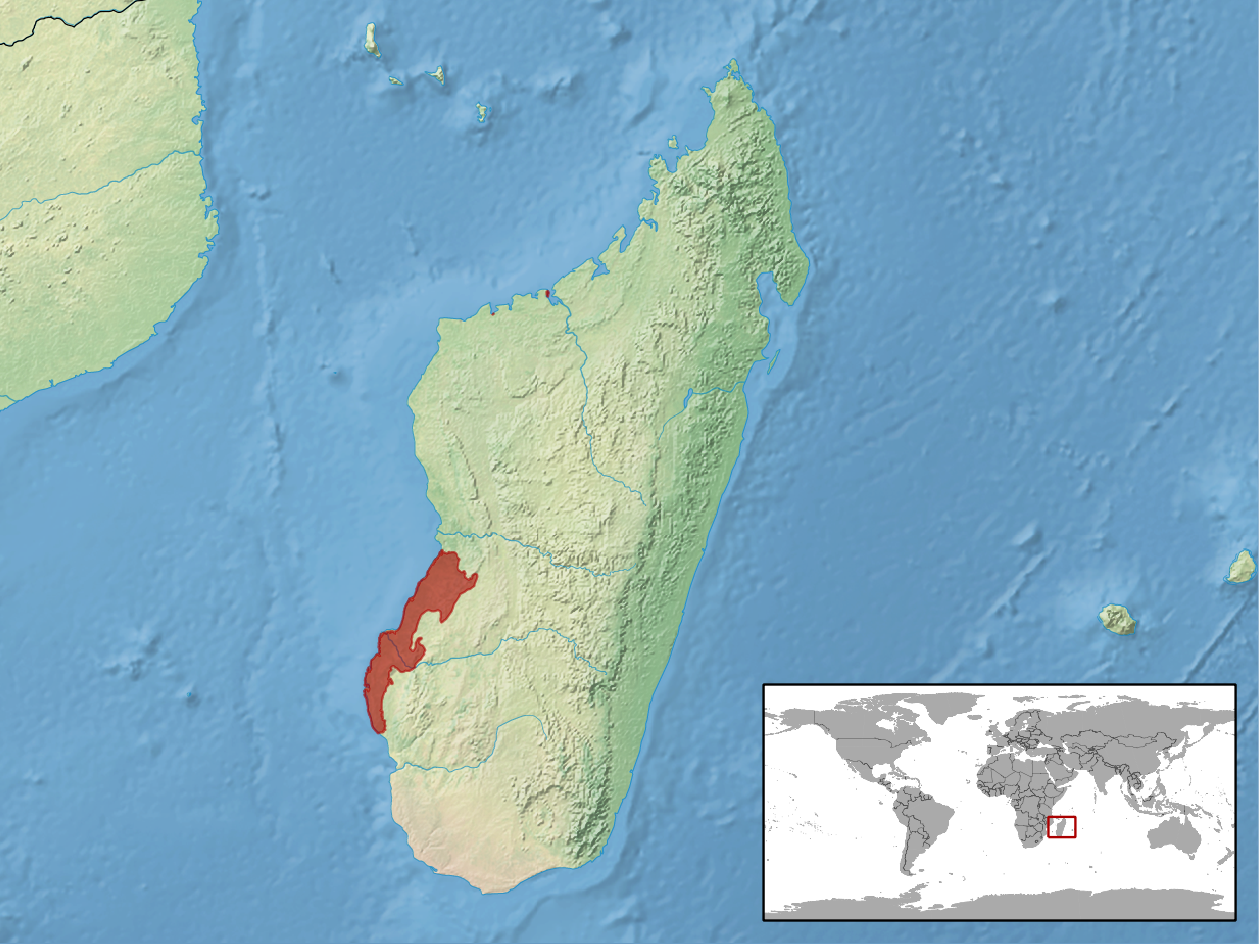

Synonyms
- Chamaeleo labordi Grandidier, 1872; Chamaeleo barbouri Heckenbleikner, 1942; Furcifer labordi — Glaw & Vences, 1994

= Labord's chameleon =

Species of lizard

Labord's chameleon (Furcifer labordi) is a species of chameleon, a lizard in the family Chamaeleonidae. The species is endemic to dry and deciduous forests, including spiny forests, in lowlands of western Madagascar, at altitudes of 20–100 m (66–328 ft). It is considered vulnerable because of ongoing habitat loss.

== Etymology ==
The specific name, labordi, is in honor of French adventurer Jean Laborde.

== Life cycle ==
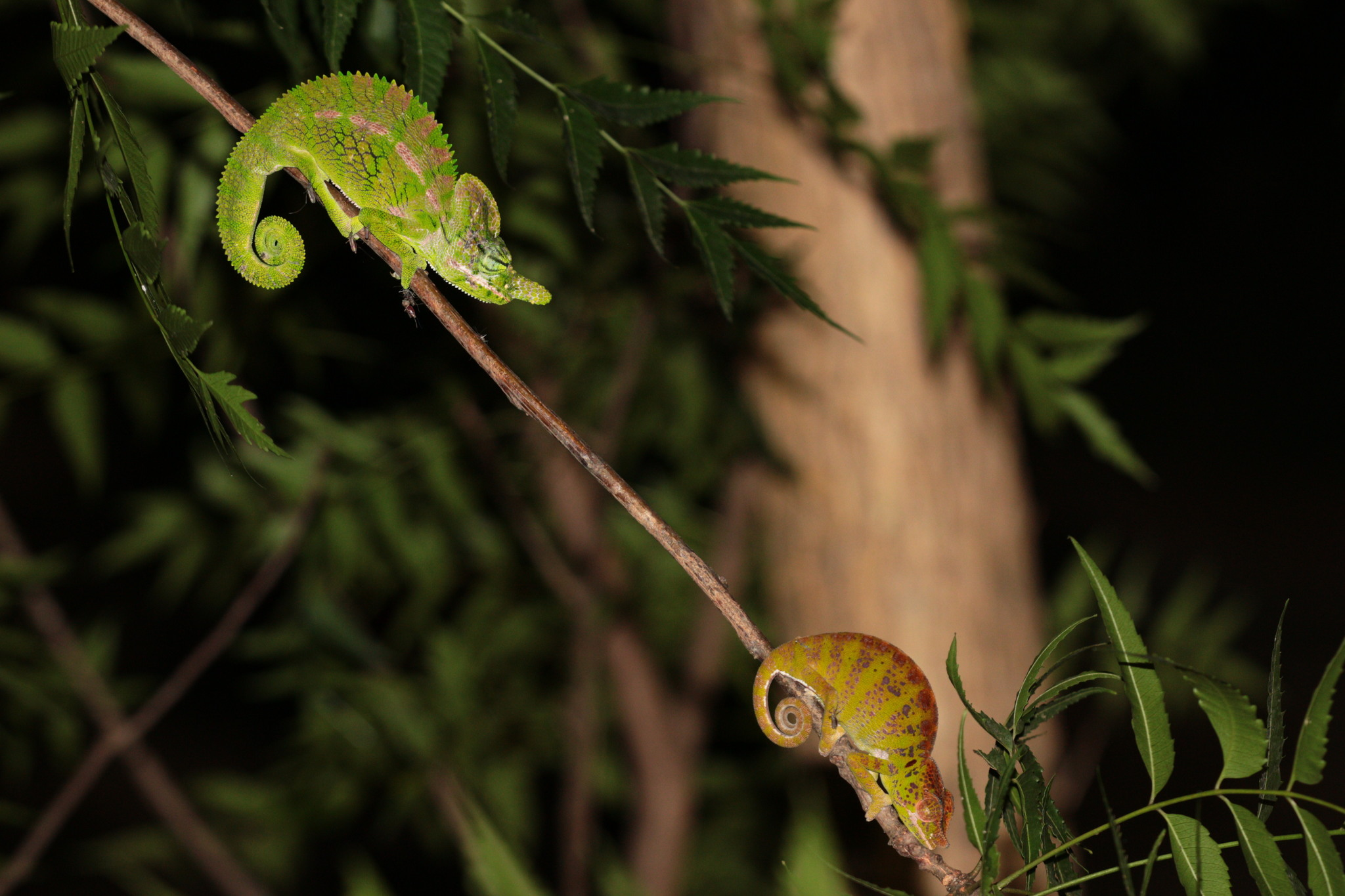
Male above, female below

F. labordi is the only chameleon confirmed to typically–but not always–have a one-year life cycle with adults dying after having bred (they are semelparous), although there are indications that this often also is the case for some other related species, for example F. antimena, F. campani and F. lateralis.

The shortest lifespan after hatching in F. labordi is found in certain populations living in the most arid regions of the species' range. In these, the eggs hatch synchronously at the start of the wet season in November, just after the first rains. Their initial growth after hatching is rapid, and adulthood is reached by January, at which time they breed. Between late January and late March, females deposit the eggs in the ground, as many as 11 in a clutch, which will hatch the next wet seasons, and all adults die. In such populations, they live for only about 4 to 5 months after hatching, making it the shortest lifespan ever recorded for a tetrapod vertebrate.

In certain other populations that inhabit less harsh habitats with higher rainfall, hatchlings emerge from the eggs up to about one month earlier, and lifespan after hatching typically is 6 to 9 months. They take longer to reach maturity after hatching and some females may breed twice in a wet season (they are not strictly semelparous). Exceptionally, females in such regions may even survive through a dry season and into the following breeding seasons, thus living well past one year after hatching. In contrast, males compete heavily for mating rights, often fighting other males and sometimes not feeding for days when guarding a female, and in the wild they consistently die after a breeding season. When instead kept in captivity and prevented from partaking in the strenuous competition for mating rights, males show similar lifespans as females, sometimes also exceeding one year after hatching.

== As prey ==
F. labordi is preyed upon by snakes of the genera Madagascarophis and Mimophis.
