= Lake Mandraka =

Lake Mantasoa
- Location within Madagascar
- Location: Mantasoa, Analamanga region, Madagascar
- Coordinates: 18.9196°S 47.9284°E
- Type: reservoir
- Water volume: 120,000,000 cubic metres (4.2×10^{9} cu ft)
- Surface elevation: 1,382 metres (4,534 ft)

Lake Mantasoa is a large lake created by the Mandraka Dam on the Mandraka River in the Analamanga region of Madagascar. It has an extension of 2005 ha.
