= Sahofika Hydroelectric Power Station =

Power station in Madagascar

- Map of Madagascar showing the location of Sahofika. Sahofika Hydroelectric Power Station (Africa)
- Country: Madagascar
- Location: Antanifotsy
- Coordinates: 19°34′01″S 47°24′24″E
- Purpose: Power
- Status: Under construction
- Construction began: 2019
- Opening date: 2024 Expected

Power Station
- Turbines: 7 x 29.3 MW
- Installed capacity: 205 megawatts (275,000 hp)
- Annual generation: 1,570 GWh
- Website www.neho.mg

Sahofika Hydroelectric Power Station, also referred to as Sahofika Power Station, is a 205 megawatts (275,000 hp) hydroelectric power station under construction in Madagascar.

== Location ==
The power station is located across the Onive River, approximately 100 kilometres (62 mi), outside of the capital city of Antananarivo.

== Overview ==
The power station is the largest electricity generation project in Madagascar. The dam will be 60 metres (197 ft) high, creating a reservoir with a surface area of 6.7 square kilometres (3 sq mi). From the reservoir, water will flow through a pipeline that measures 716 metres (2,349 ft) long to arrive at the power house. The power house comprises seven turbines, each rated at 29.3 megawatts, for a total output of 205 megawatts. The power generated at this power plant will be evacuated via a new 220 kiloVolts high voltage transmission line to a location where Jirama, the national electricity utility, will integrate it into the national electricity grid. A 25-year power purchase agreement has been signed, between NEHO and Jirama.

This power station is expected to supply power to an estimated 8 million people and help Madagascar avoid the emission of 900,000 tonnes of carbon dioxide every year.

== Developers, ownership and funding ==
The project is a public private partnership (PPP), between (a) the Government of Madagascar and (b) a consortium called Nouvelle énergie hydroélectrique de l’Onive (NEHO) or New Onive Hydroelectric Energy Consortium, comprising the French companies Eiffage and Eranove and the company Themis. The government of Madagascar will contribute €30 million towards the development of this power station.

The African Development Bank, through the African Development Fund, lent €4.02 million to the government Madagascar towards this project. In addition, the Arab Bank for Economic Development in Africa (BADEA) and the European Union, are expected to provide further funding for this project.

== Cost and construction ==
The total cost for the power station is US$895 million (approx. €836 million). The NEHO consortium was selected to carry out the feasibility studies, provide financing, construct the power station, operate the station when completed and maintain it in future. The government of Madagascar will contribute €30 million towards the project and will be a shareholder in the power station when completed. Construction began in December 2019 and commissioning of the completed project is expected in 2024.

== Associated infrastructure ==
The construction work involves (a) the new power station (b) a new 220kV transmission line, measuring approximately 75 kilometres (47 mi) and (c) rehabilitation of approximately 110 kilometres (68 mi) of access roads. It is expected that the power station will come online in 2024.

== See also ==
- Africa Dams
- Madagascar Power Stations
- Volobe Hydroelectric Power Station
