= Jean Laborde =

French adventurer and early industrialist in Madagascar (1805-1878)

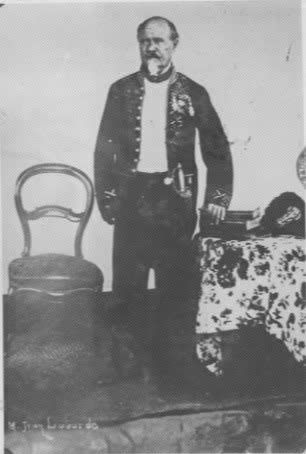
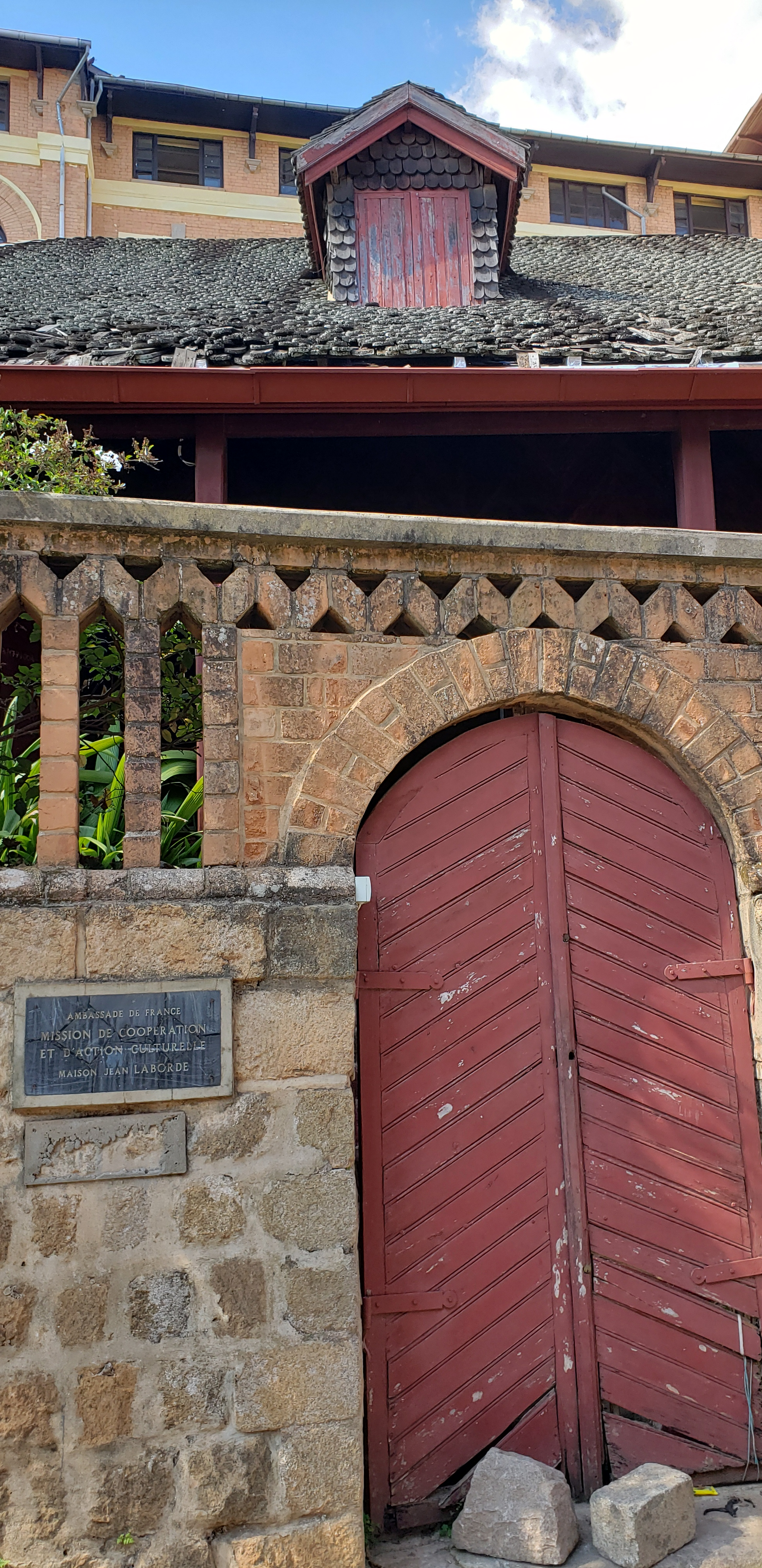
Jean Laborde and his Antananarivo home

Jean Laborde (16 October 1805 in Auch – 27 December 1878 in Mantasoa, Madagascar) was an adventurer and early industrialist in Madagascar. He became the chief engineer of the Merina monarchy, supervising the creation of a modern manufacturing center under Queen Ranavalona I. Later he became the first French consul to Madagascar, when the government of Napoleon III used him to establish French influence on the island.

Born to a blacksmith, Laborde emigrated to India, before attempting to recover treasure from ships wrecked along the coast of Madagascar in 1831. After becoming shipwrecked himself, Laborde made his way to Antananarivo where he manufactured muskets and gunpowder for the queen in a factory located in Ilafy.

Laborde then organized 20,000 forced labourers to build an industrial complex in Mantasoa, closer to water, wood, and iron ore. There, 1,200 workmen produced cannon, swords, bricks, tiles, pottery, glass, porcelain, silk, soap, candles, sealing-wax, lime, cement, charcoal, ink, dyes, sugar, rum, sulfuric acid, and lightning conductors.

Laborde also constructed Rainiharo's tomb, and the Queen's Palace.

Laborde got involved in the 1857 coup instigated by Joseph-François Lambert and was banned by the queen. After the queen was succeeded by Radama II, he was able to return in 1861. Napoleon III named him as the first French consul to the Merina court.

The French government became involved in a dispute with the Malagasy over the inheritance of Laborde's property after his death in 1878, some of which was a gift from Queen Ranavalona I. These and other French claims formed the pretext for France's later armed intervention.

A species of chameleon endemic to Madagascar, Furcifer labordi, is named in his honor.
