= Ambatolampy =

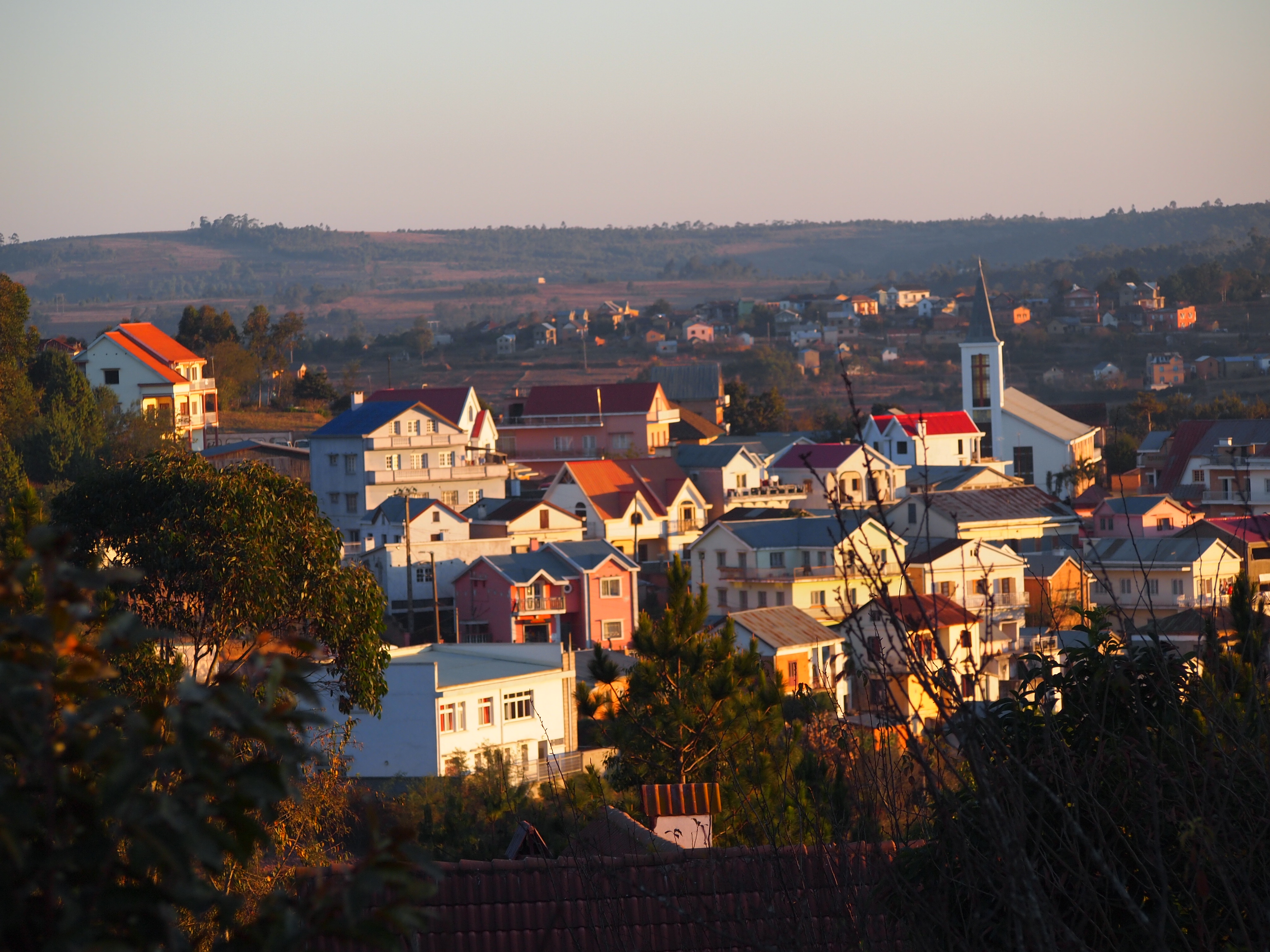
- Ambatolampy skyline

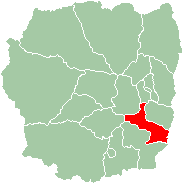
- Map of Antananarivo Province showing the location of Ambatolampy

- Location in Madagascar
- Coordinates: 19°23′10″S 47°25′45″E
- Country: Madagascar
- Region: Vakinankaratra

Area
  - Total: 30 km^{2} (12 sq mi)
- Elevation: 1,644 m (5,394 ft)

Population (2013)
  - Total: 28,500
- Postal code: 104
- Climate: Cwb

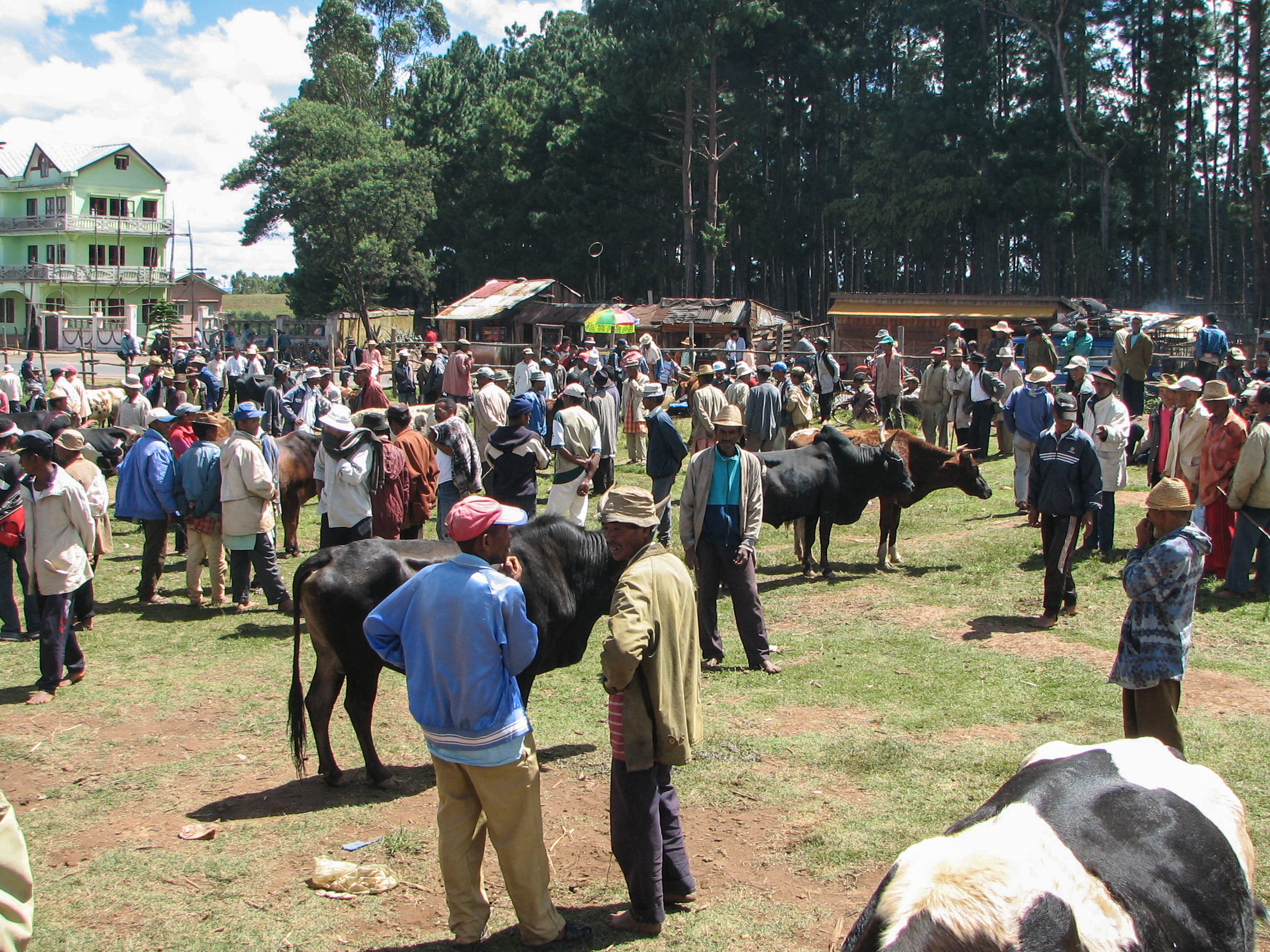
Zebu market in Ambatolampy

Ambatolampy (French : Ambutublou) is a city (commune urbaine) in the Vakinankaratra Region, situated in the Central Highlands of Madagascar. It had a population of about 28,500 in 2013.

It is the administrative capital of the district of the same name, and is situated on Route nationale No. 7 which runs from Antananarivo to Toliara. Ambatolampy is a railway station on the Antananarivo - Antsirabe line. It is situated at 70 km South from the capital Antananarivo.

A species of gecko, Lygodactylus tolampyae, may be named after Ambatolampy.

== Economy ==
Ambatolampy is known for its Aluminium founderies. Most of aluminium kitchen utensils in Madagascar are produced in this town. The founderies also work with copper and bronze. Various workshops are specialized in recycling old metal.

== Museums ==
The Butterfly museum (Musée des Papillons) is in Ambatolampy. The museum exhibits 6,000 species of insects and butterflies.

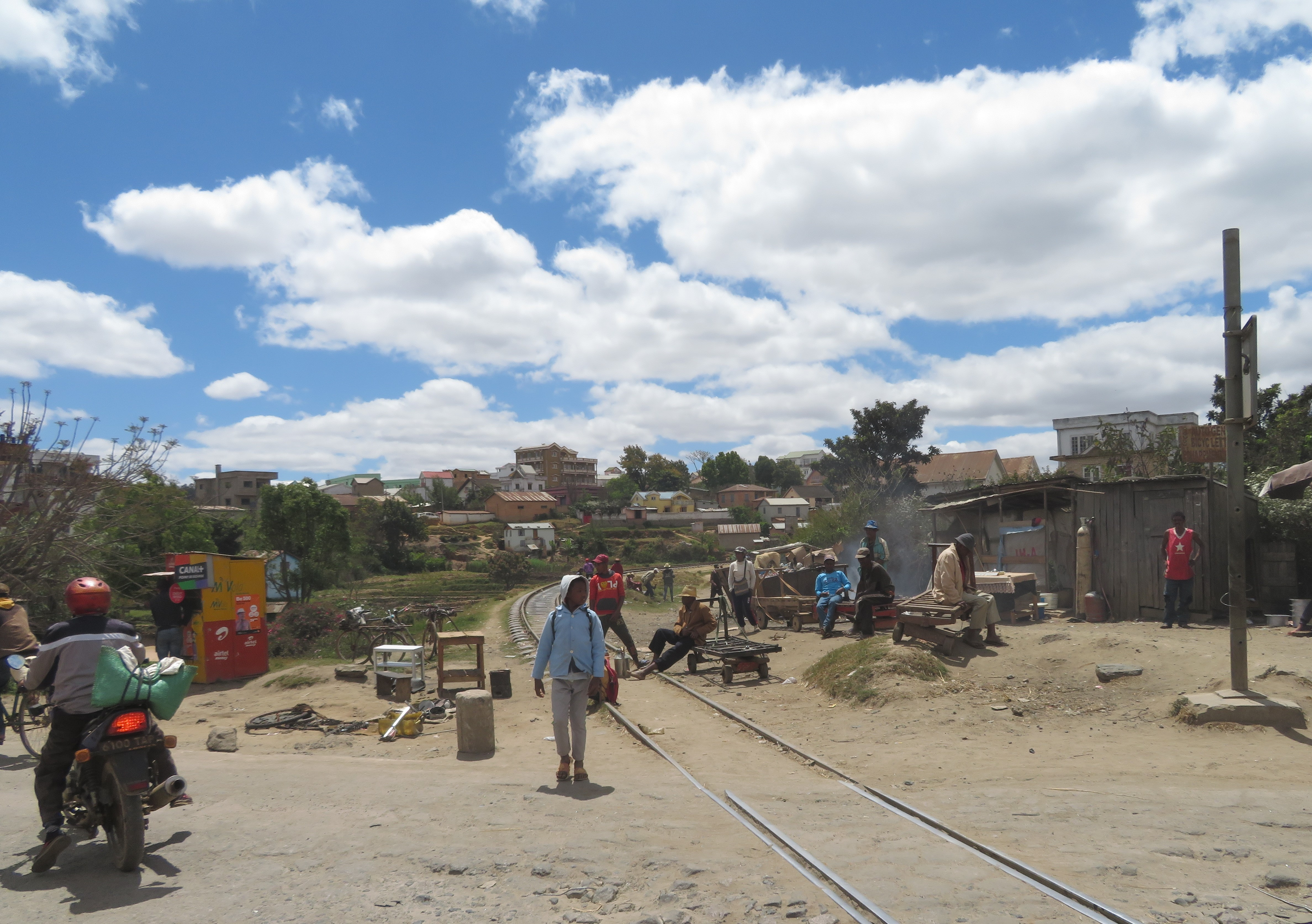
Railway crossing

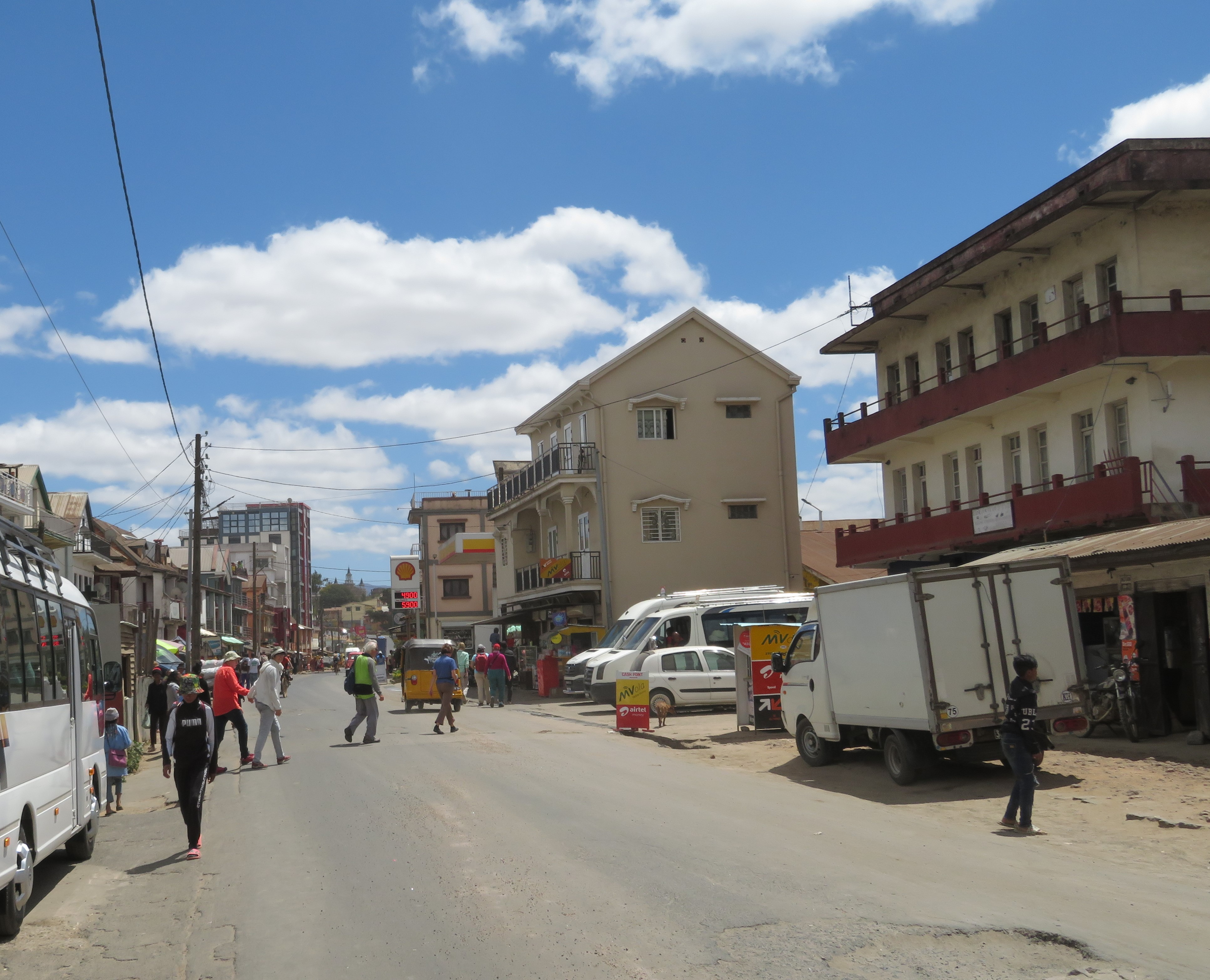
Main Street

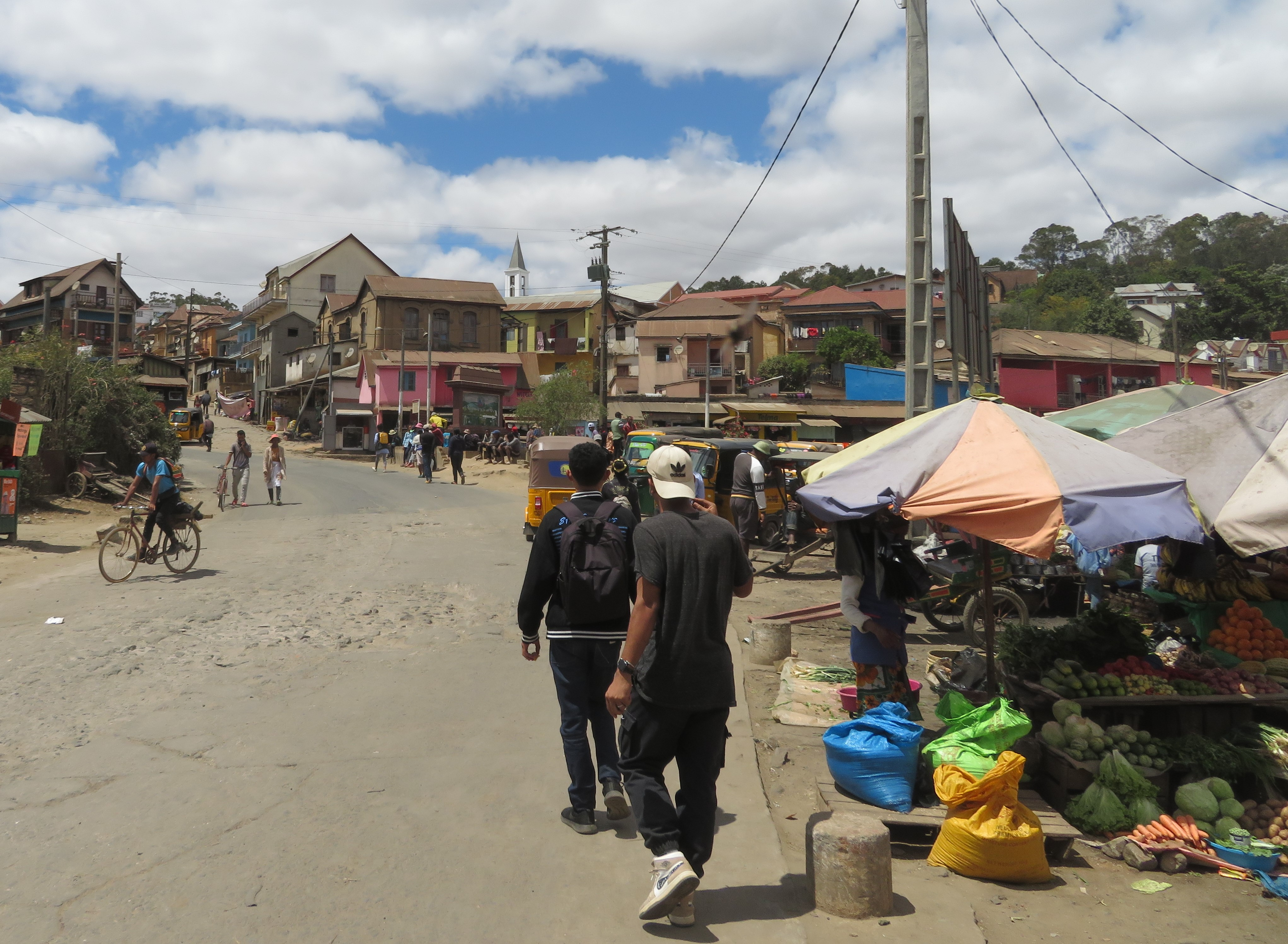
Main street

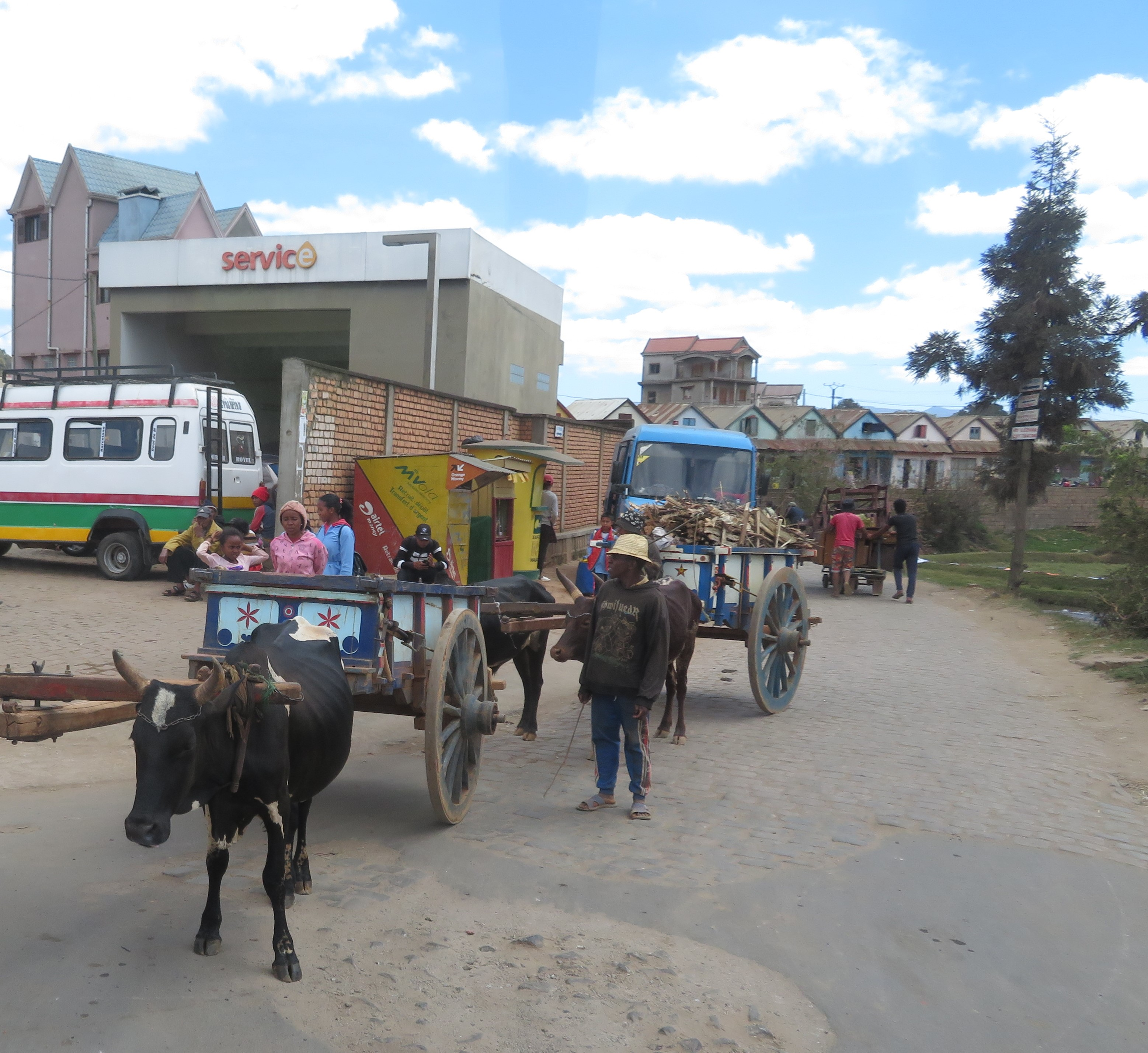
Oxcarts

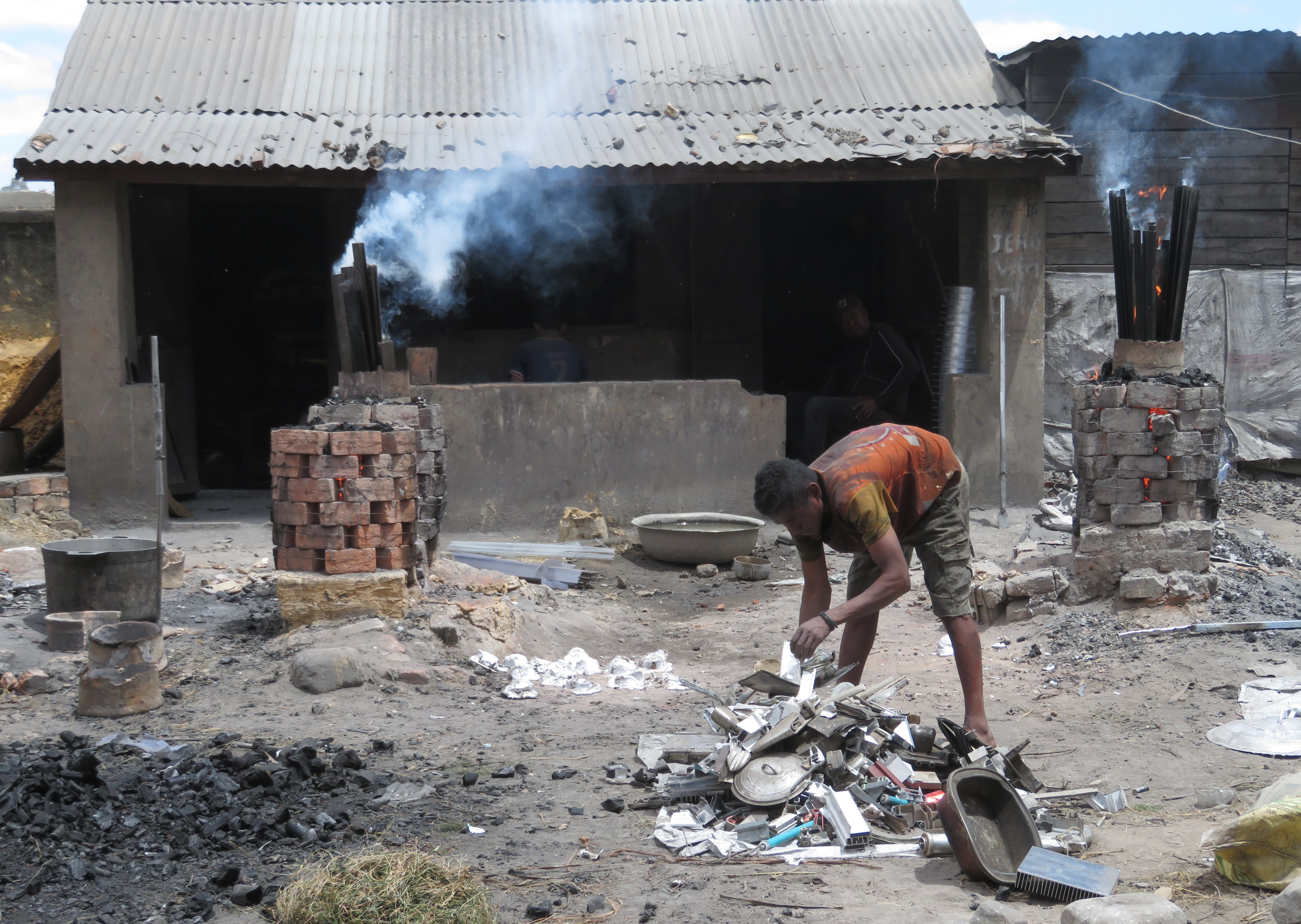
Recycling metal in a foundery

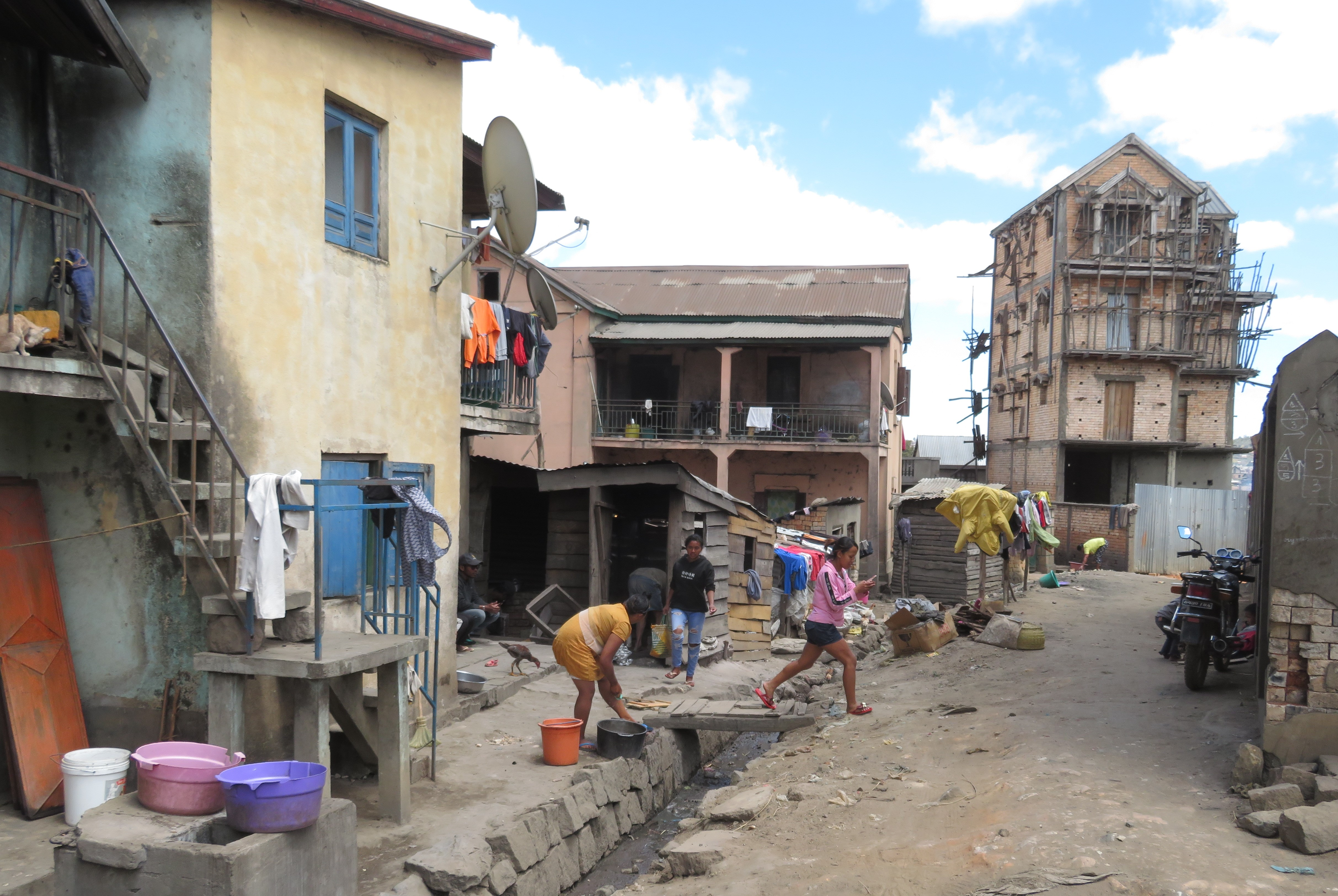
Typical residential area

== See also ==
- Ambatolampy Solar Power Station
