= Antelomita Hydroelectric Power Station =

Hydroelectric power station in Madagascar

- Country: Madagascar
- Location: Anjeva Gara, Analamanga Region
- Coordinates: 19°00′43.25″S 47°42′11.98″E
- Status: Operational
- Commission date: Antelomita I: 1930; Antelomita II: 1952-1953
- Owner: Jirama
- Operator: Jirama

Power generation
- Units operational: Antelomita I: 3 x 1.4 MW (1,900 hp) MW; Antelomita II: 3 x 1.4 MW (1,900 hp)
- Nameplate capacity: 8.4 MW (11,300 hp)

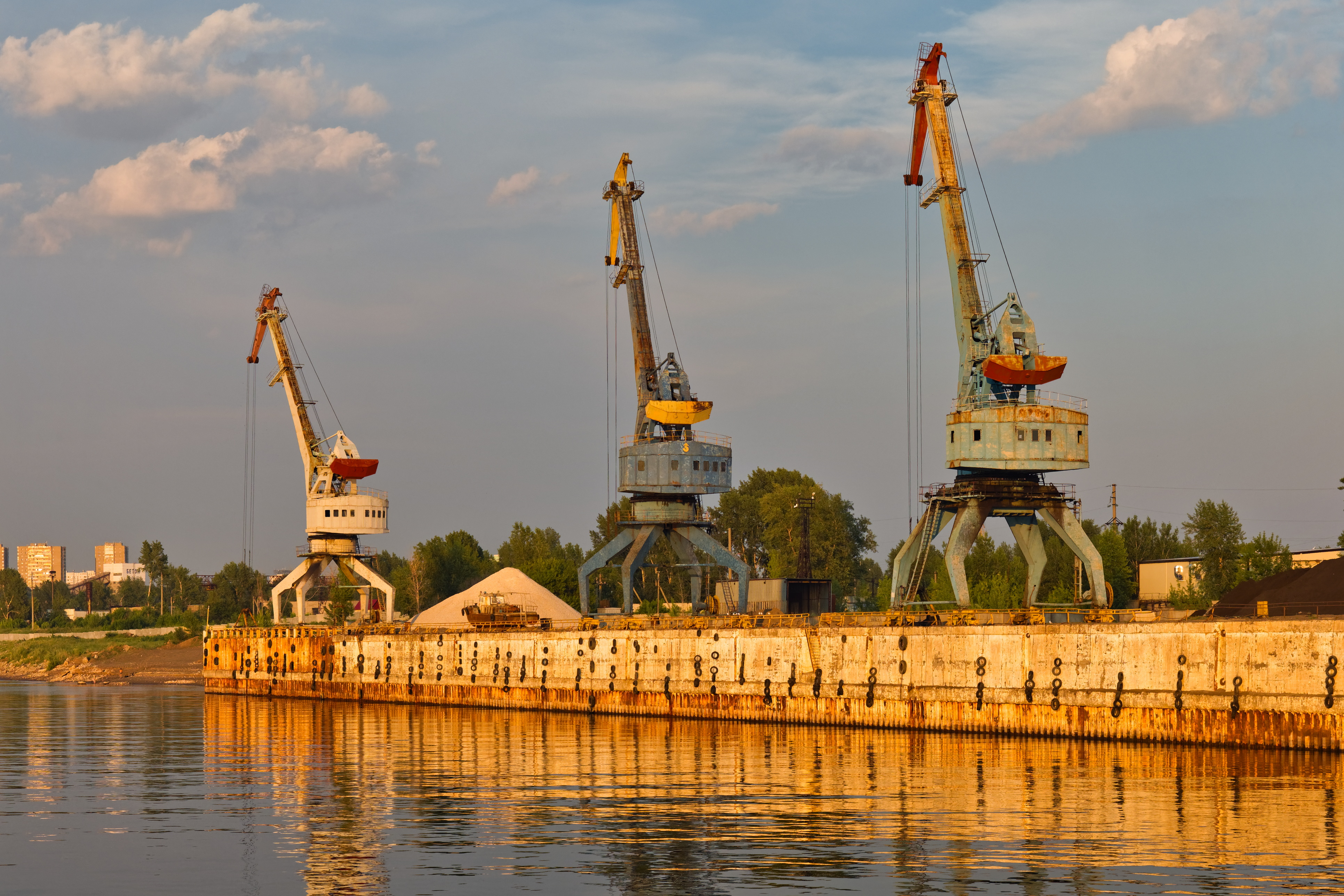

The Antelomita Hydroelectric Power Station is located in the rural commune Anjeva Gara of the Analamanga Region, Madagascar. The hydroelectric power station comprises two parts, Antelomita I and II. Both are adjacent to one another on separate water falls along the Ikopa River. Each water fall is dammed and water is diverted to the power station; each of which contains three 1.4-megawatt (1,900 hp) generators. The first two were commissioned in 1930, the second two in 1952 and the final two in 1953. Both stages have an installed capacity of 8.4 megawatts (11,300 hp). They were built by a French firm but are now owned and operated by Jirama. The Tsiazompaniry and Mantasoa Dams upstream regulate water to the power station.

It is situated 48 kilometres (30 mi) southeast from Antananarivo, 10 kilometres (6 mi) east from Anjeva Gara and 14 kilometres (9 mi) from Ambohimanambola.
