= Mandraka Dam =

Dam in Analamanga, Madagascar

- Location within Madagascar
- Country: Madagascar
- Location: Mandraka, Analamanga Region
- Coordinates: 18°55′16.79″S 47°55′46.14″E
- Purpose: Power
- Status: Operational
- Opening date: 1956
- Owner: Jirama

Dam and spillways
- Type of dam: Gravity
- Impounds: Mandraka River
- Height: 20 m (66 ft)

Reservoir
- Creates: Lake Mandraka
- Total capacity: 36×10^{6} m^{3} (29,000 acre⋅ft)

Mandraka Power Station
- Coordinates: 18°55′35.37″S 47°56′49.51″E
- Commission date: 1958-1972
- Hydraulic head: 226 m (741 ft)
- Turbines: 4 x 6 MW (8,000 hp) Pelton-type
- Installed capacity: 24 MW (32,000 hp)

Mandraka Dam is a gravity dam on the Mandraka River near Mandraka in the Analamanga Region of Madagascar. The dam was constructed by a French firm by 1956 and creates Lake Mandraka.

== Mandraka Power Station ==
The dam supplies water to a 24 megawatts (32,000 hp) hydroelectric power station 1.9 km (1.2 mi) to the east, down in the valley. The change in elevation between the dam and power station affords a hydraulic head on 226 metres (741 ft). The dam and power station are operated and owned by Jirama and the four 6 megawatts (8,000 hp) Pelton turbine-generators were commissioned between 1958 and 1972.

== Climatic condition of Mandraka Dam ==
The expanded recurrence and force of environment related dangers (including floods, dry seasons and typhoons) is undermining the vocations, wellbeing and prosperity of populaces living in the waterfront zones of Madagascar. Most neighborhood networks here live beneath the neediness line and depend intensely on downpour took care of agribusiness and beach front assets to help their jobs. The venture expects to addresses the unfriendly impacts of environmental change on the beach front networks in four regions of Madagascar.

The area marker is located on Analamanga District. Sprinkle or light snow fall may be undetectable for the radar. Precipitation power is variety coded, going from turquoise to red.

The Mandraka Dam is a buttress dam on the Varahina-North River, a tributary of the Ikopa River, near Mantasoa in the Analamanga region of Madagascar. The dam was built by jirama contractors during 1956. It creates Lake Mandraka which has a height of 20m (66.ft) The dam itself is made of 8,000 m3 of concrete and has a reinforced buttress design. Water released from the dam provides a regulated flow to the hydroelectric plant at the Antelomita Dams downstream. A saddle dam on the north side of Mantosoa Reservoir regulates water flow in the Mandraka River to the Mandraka Dam downstream.

== See also ==
- Mantasoa Dam – regulates water flow to Mandraka Dam
