= Anjeva Gara =

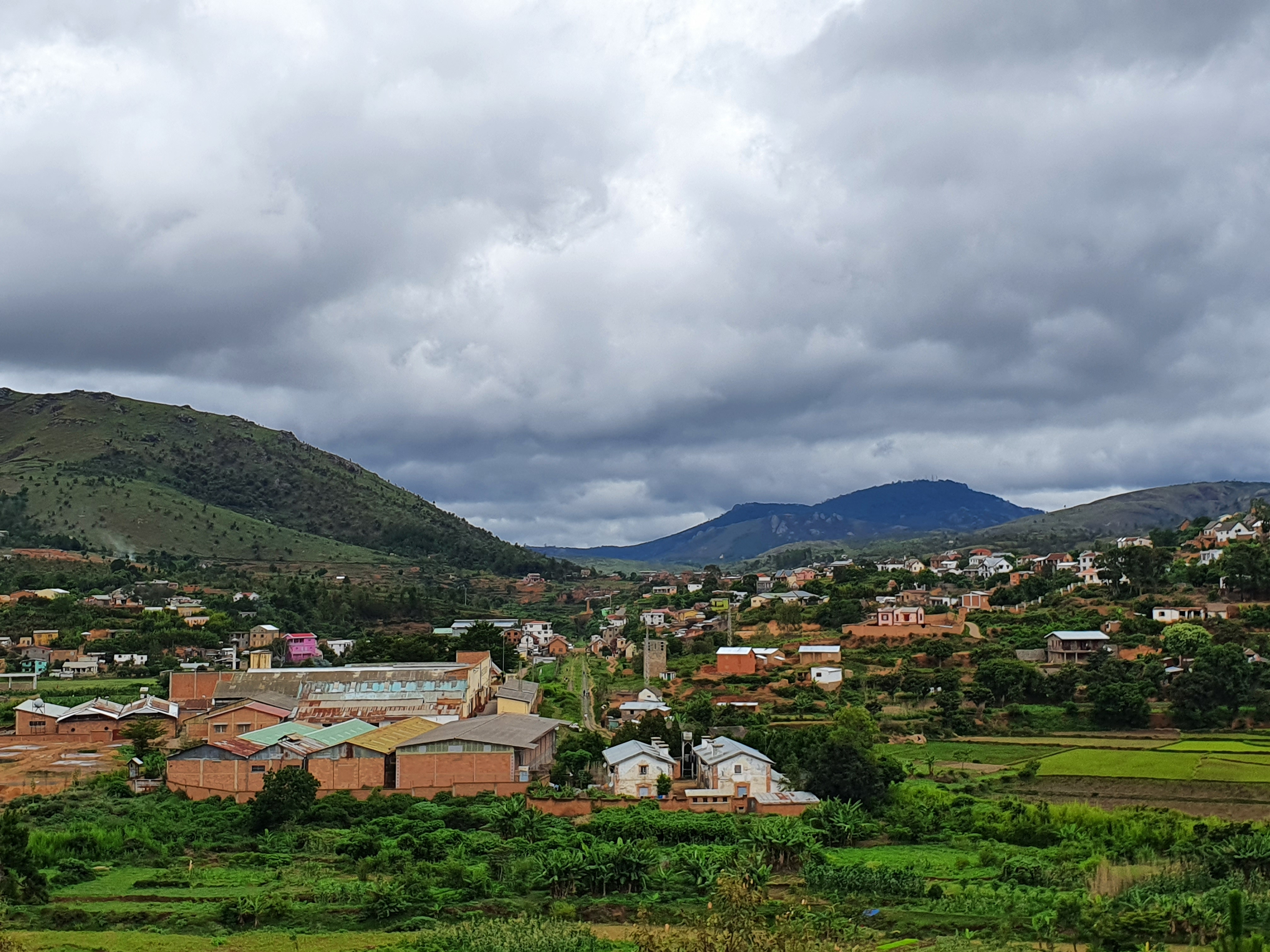
- Anjeva Gara

- Location in Madagascar
- Coordinates: 18°56′S 47°40′E
- Country: Madagascar
- Region: Analamanga
- District: Antananarivo Avaradrano
- Elevation: 1,550 m (5,090 ft)

Population (2018)
  - Total: 8,278
  - Density: 393.84/km^{2} (1,020.0/sq mi)
- Time zone: UTC3 (EAT)
- postal code: 103

Anjeva Gara is a rural commune in Analamanga Region, in the Central Highlands of Madagascar. It belongs to the district of Antananarivo Avaradrano and its populations numbers to 8,278 in 2018.

== Economy ==
10km east of Anjeva Gara on the Ikopa River is found the Antelomita Hydroelectric Power Station. It has a capacity of 8.4 MW.
