= Ambodilazana =

- Location in Madagascar
- Coordinates: 18°07′10″S 49°07′15″E
- Country: Madagascar
- Region: Atsinanana
- District: Toamasina II

Population (2019)Census
  - Total: 13,304
- Time zone: UTC3 (EAT)
- Postal code: 502

Ambodilazana is a rural commune in the district of Toamasina II (district), in the region of Atsinanana, on the east coast of Madagascar.

== See also ==
- Volobe Hydroelectric Power Station
