= Mantasoa =

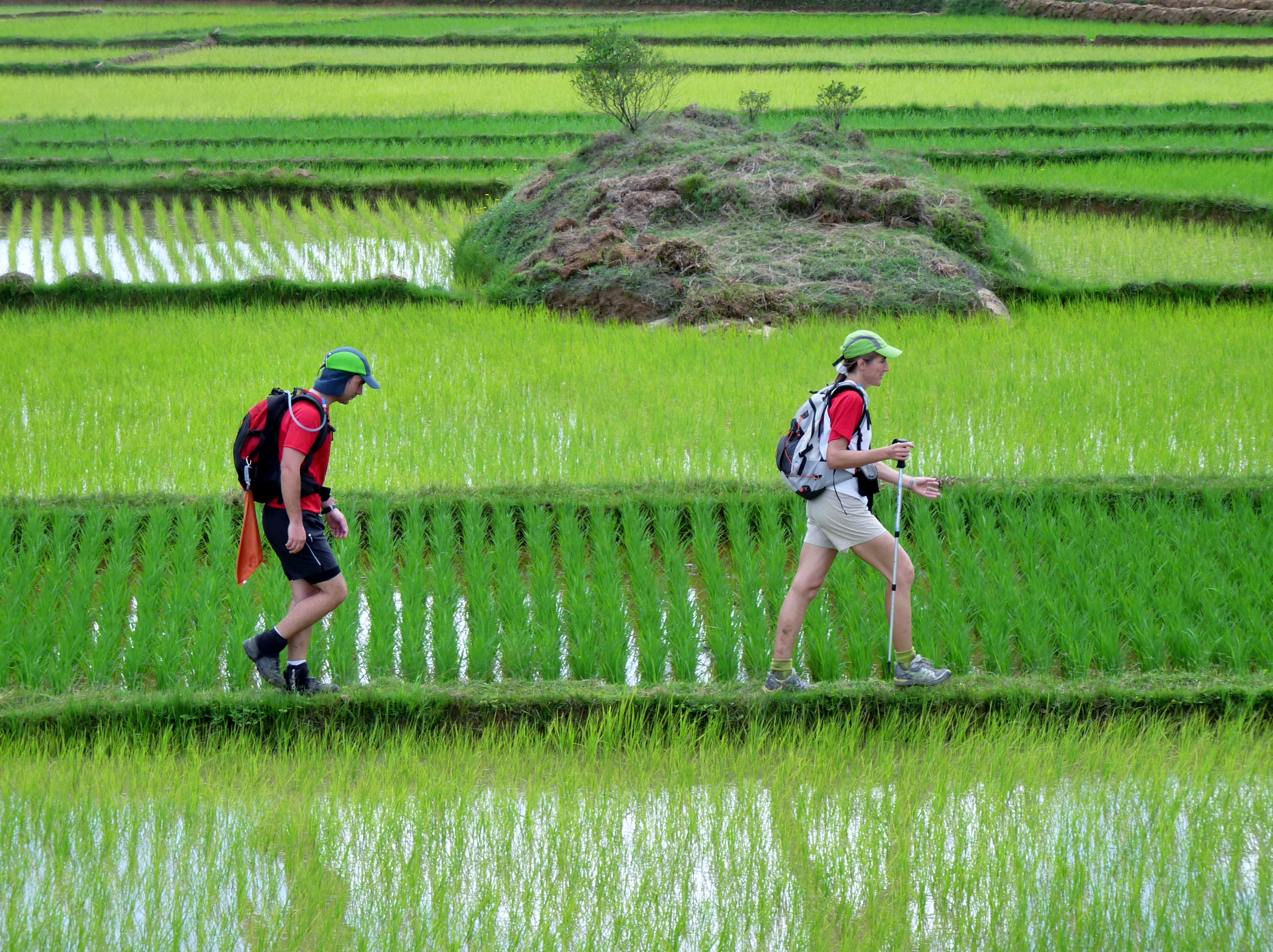
- from Carion to Mantasoa
- Nickname: Soatsimanampiovana
- Location in Madagascar
- Coordinates: 19°1′S 47°50′E
- Country: Madagascar
- Region: Analamanga
- District: Manjakandriana

Government
  - Mayor: Lala Ranaivoharisoa

Area
  - Total: 106 km^{2} (41 sq mi)
- Elevation: 1,397 m (4,583 ft)

Population (2018)
  - Total: 10,604
- Time zone: UTC3 (EAT)
- Postal code: 116

Mantasoa is a municipality in Madagascar. It belongs to the district of Manjakandriana, which is a part of Analamanga Region. The population of the municipality was 10,604 in 2018.

Mantasoa is located at 68 km East of Antananarivo. 60 villages in 11 Fokontany (localities) belong to this municipality.

== Education ==
There are 20 schools in Mantasoa: 14 primary schools and 6 secondary schools.

== Economy ==
The majority 95.5% of the population of the commune are farmers, while an additional 0.5% receives their livelihood from raising livestock. The most important crop is rice, while other important products are beans, cassava and sweet potatoes. Services provide employment for 3% of the population. Additionally fishing employs 1% of the population.

20,05 km2 (18,9%) of the surface of this municipality is occupied by the Lake Mantasoa. 9 km2 is agriculture land, 3,1 km2 by rice and 5,71 km2 of other plantations (Tanety).

West of the lake is private land with Eucalyptus and Pinus plantations over 15,73 km2. Only 3,1 km2 of the original forests remain.

== History ==
Matasoa was one of the first industrial sites in Madagascar From 1837 onwards, the Frenchman Jean Laborde, in contract with the queen Ranavalona I, built up an industrial complex where 1,200 workmen produced cannons, rifles, bullets, swords, bricks, tiles, pottery, glass, porcelain, silk, soap, candles, sealing-wax, lime, cement, charcoal, ink, dyes, sugar, rum, sulphuric acid, and lightning conductors.

In present time its premises house the Lycée Jean Laborde and the technical lycée of Mantasoa. The site has been placed on Madagascar's Tentative List for future inclusion in Unesco's World Heritage List.

Peace Corps Madagascar's training center is located in Mantasoa.

== Rivers ==
- The Ikopa River and the Varahina, an affluent, cross the municipality.

== Lakes ==
- Lake Mantasoa

== See also ==
- Lake Mantasoa
- Mantasoa Dam
