= Jirama =

State-owned electric utility and water services company in Madagascar

JIRAMA (Jiro sy rano malagasy)
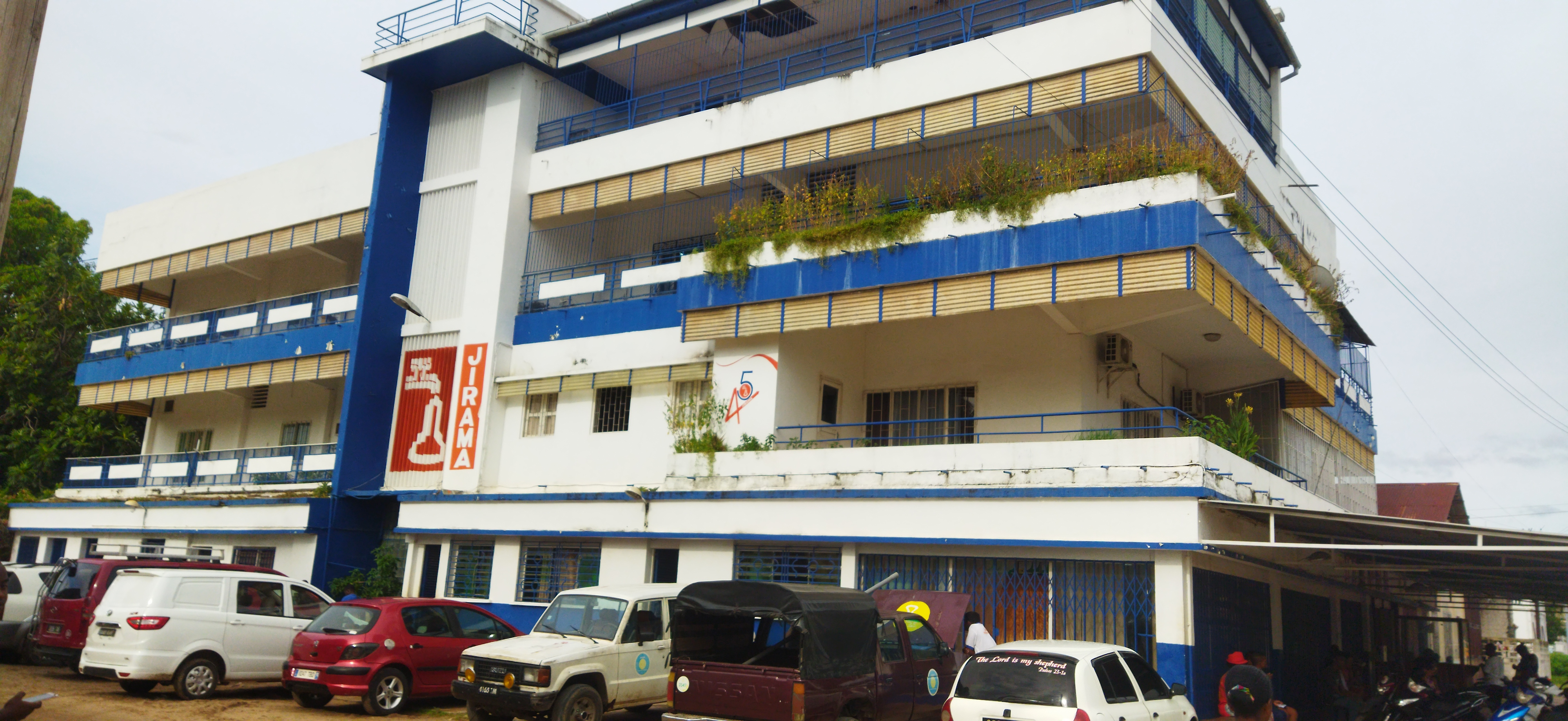
- Company type: Société anonyme
- Industry: Electric utility - Water supply
- Founded: 1975
- Headquarters: Antananarivo, Madagascar
- Area served: Madagascar
- Key people: Hajatiana Rasolomanana (director)
- Products: Electricity generation, transmission and distribution; Water supply
- Revenue: 274.88 billion Ariary (2007)
- Net income: 25.80 billion Ariary (2007)
- Total equity: 17.53 billion Ariary
- Website: www.jirama.mg

Jirama (Jiro sy rano malagasy, lit. 'Malagasy Electricity and Water') is a state-owned electric utility and water services company in Madagascar.

== History ==
The Jirama was established on 17 October 1975 when the Société Malagasy des Eaux et Electricité and the Société des Energies de Madagascar merged. Up until 1999, it was the only state-owned electricity company of the country. After 1999, the Jirama maintained its monopoly on transportation and distribution networks.

In 2007, when Antananrivo's Mayor Andry Rajoelina took office, the city's treasury had a debt of 8.2 billion Malagasy Ariary (approximately 4.6 million U.S. dollars). On 4 January 2008, because of unpaid debts to the Jirama, the city of Antananarivo was hit by a general water cutoff and brownouts of the city's street lights. After an audit, it was found that the Jirama owed about the same amount of money to the city.

In 2008, thanks to the launch of a new thermal power plant in Mandroseza, the Jirama was able to service 2,000 additional consumers in Antananarivo. but the shortages persist. According to an IMF report published in March 2018, the Jirama's financial difficulties are a major burden for the Malagasy economy. In June 2018, the Jirama was considering a rehabilitation of its electricity distribution network but in 2023 the company continues to struggle. In December 2022 another case of corruption was revealed and during the years of 2020 to 2022 the deficit continued to increase from 2.520 Billion Ariary to 3.353 billion Ariary.

== Activities ==
Headquartered in Antananarivo, the Jirama serves 340,000 clients for electricity in 114 localities and 65 water distribution centres. The Jirama is 100% owned by the government of Madagascar.

== Plants ==
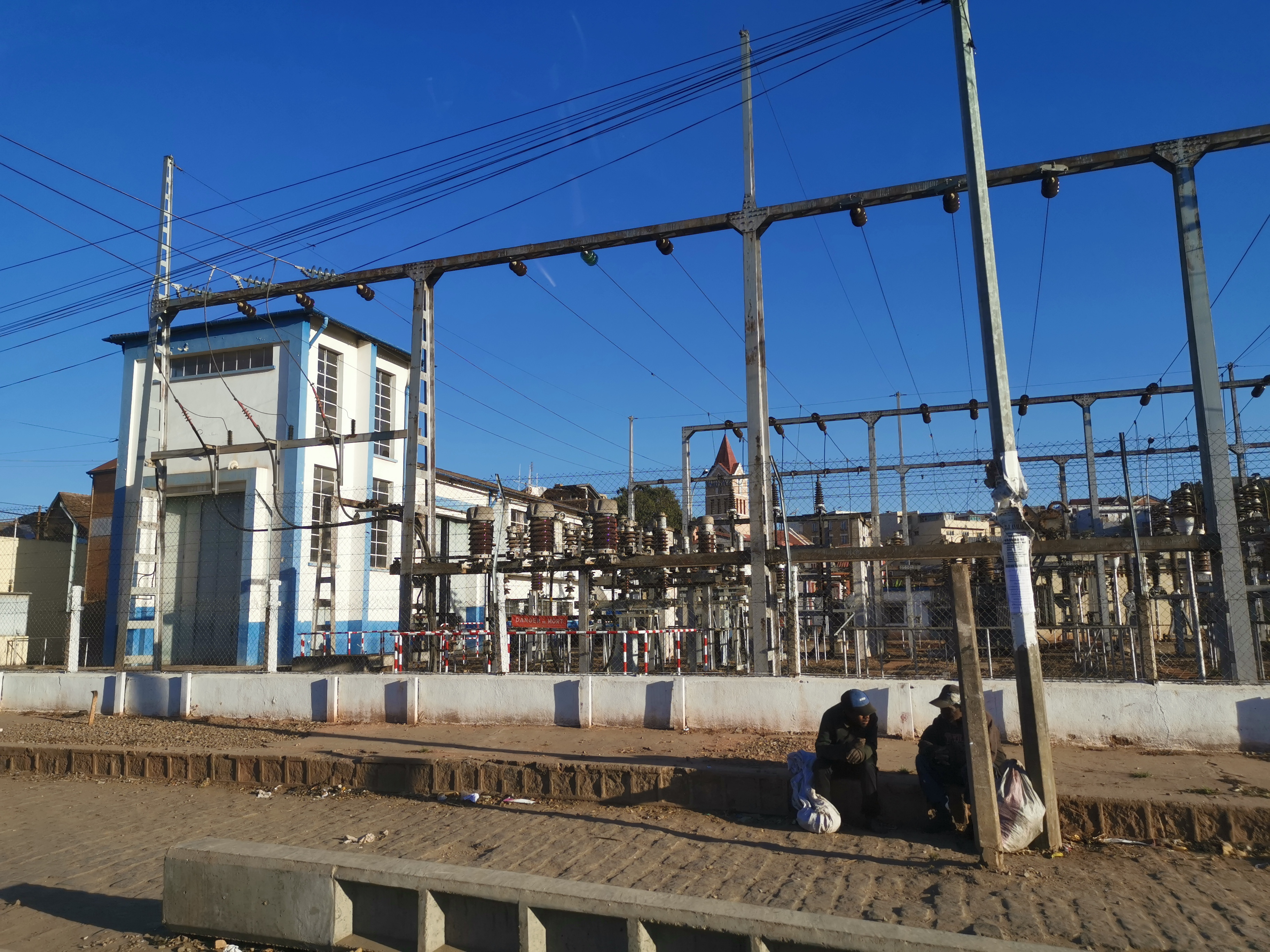
Power station in Antananarivo

- 18 MW Solar-hybride central at Tanambao Verrerie, Toamasina (since 2021)
- 8,4 MW Antelomita Hydroelectric Power Station at Anjeva Gara
- 91 MW Andekaleka Hydroelectric Power Station
- 24 MW Mandraka Power Station
- 205 MW Sahofika Hydroelectric Power Station
- List of power stations in Madagascar

== Energy ==
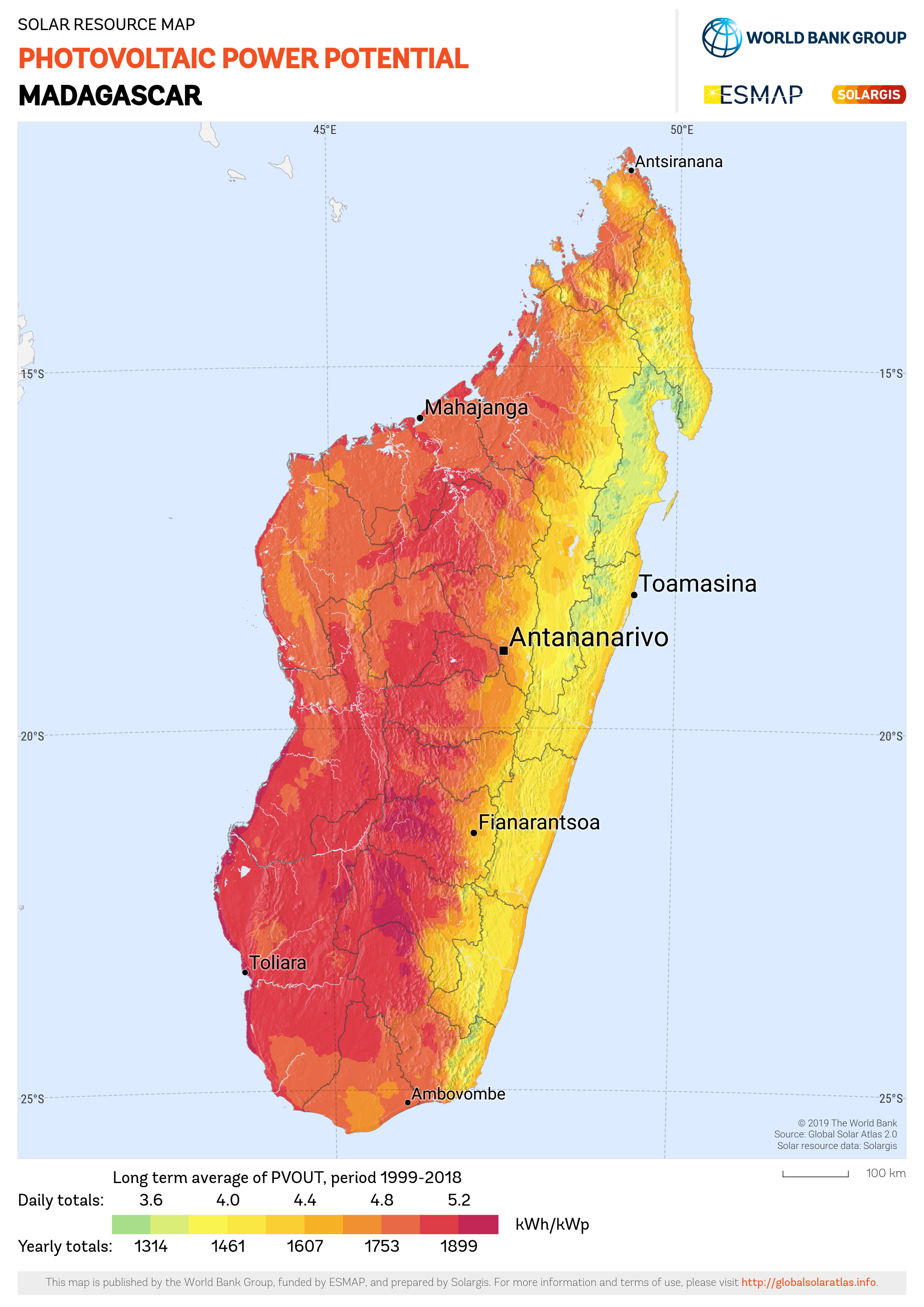
Madagascar has high photovoltaic power potential.

As of 2018, only 15% of the population of Madagascar has access to electricity.

== See also ==
- List of companies of Madagascar
