= Lucien Xavier Michel-Andrianarahinjaka =

Malagasy writer, poet and politician

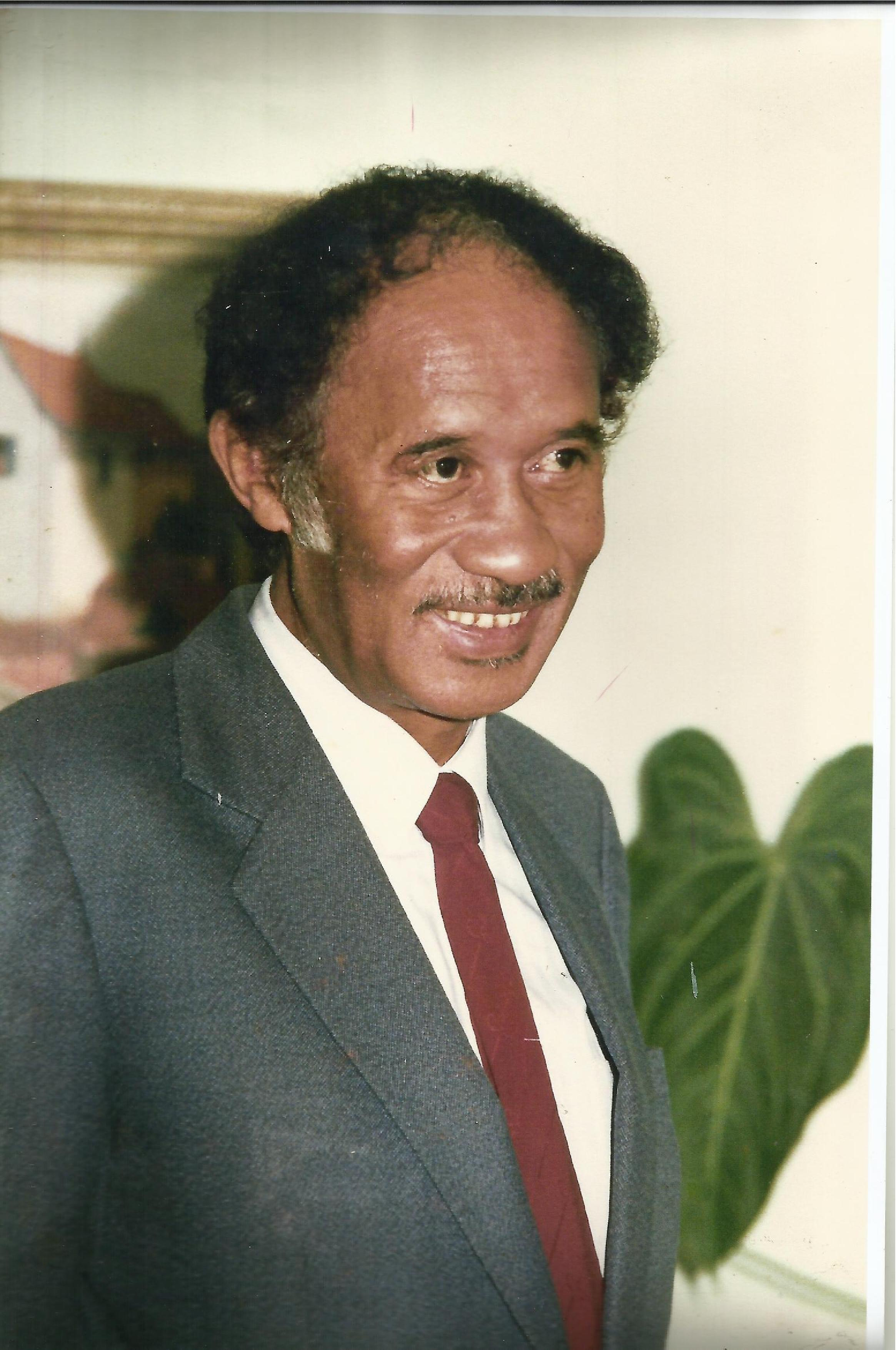

President of the National Assembly of Madagascar
- In office 1977–1991
- Preceded by: Alfred Nany
- Succeeded by: Richard Andriamanjato; Manandafy Rakotonirina

Member of the National Assembly of Madagascar
- In office 1977–1991
- Constituency: Fianarantsoa II

Personal details
- Born: 30 December 1929 Fianarantsoa, French Madagascar
- Died: 11 November 1997 (aged 67) Fianarantsoa, Madagascar
- Party: Association for the Rebirth of Madagascar
- Other political affiliations: Rassemblement Chrétien de Madagascar (before 1976)
- Children: 6
- Parent: Michel Randria
- Education: Paris-Sorbonne University; University of Bordeaux 3 (PhD)
- Occupation: Politician, poet, writer

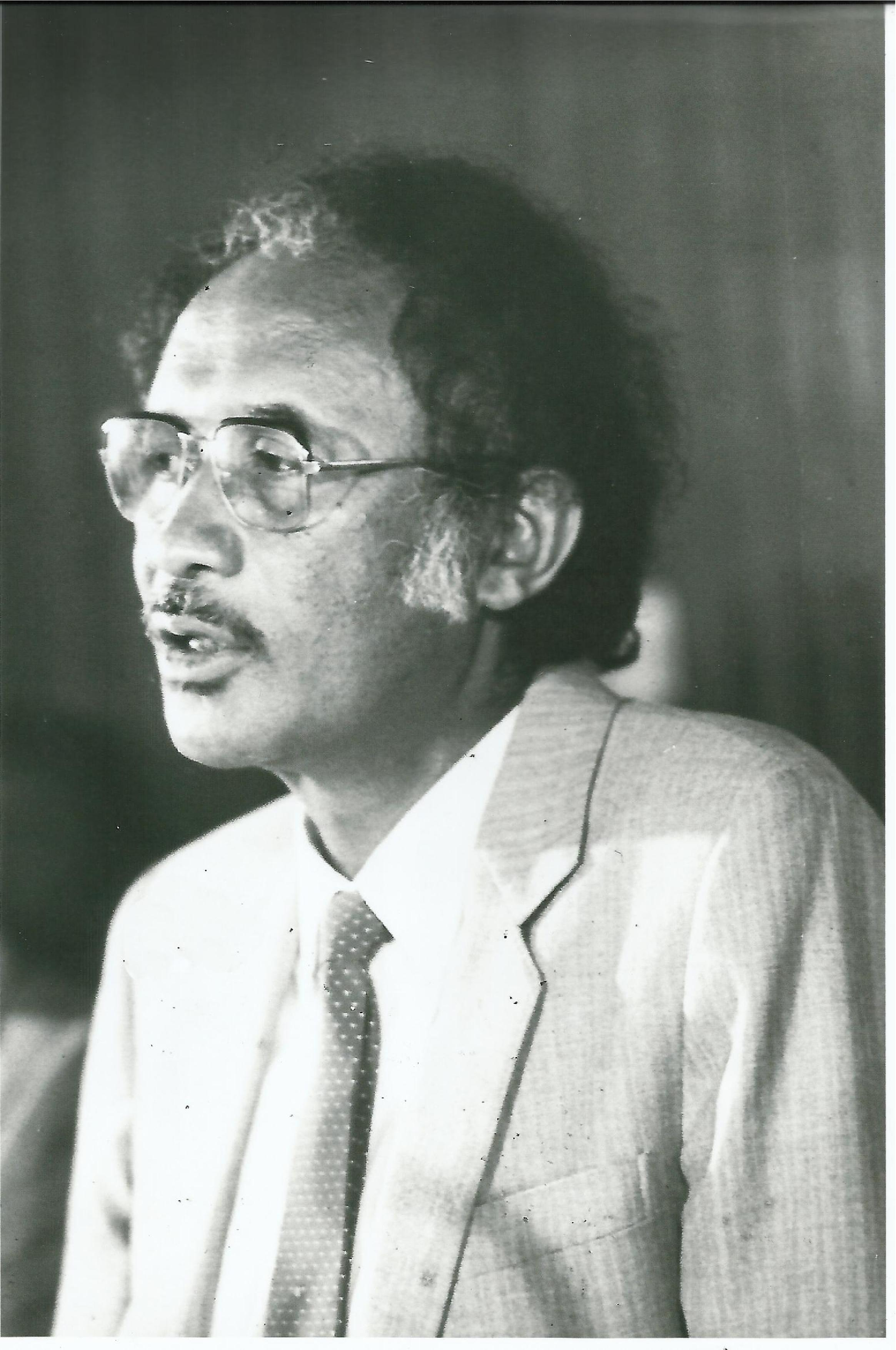

Lucien Xavier Michel-Andrianarahinjaka (30 December 1929 – 11 November 1997) was a Malagasy writer, poet, and politician. He was born in Fianarantsoa, and studied at the University of Bordeaux 3 and Paris-Sorbonne University. In 1977, he was elected to the National Assembly of Madagascar, and was also elected its president. He won reelection in 1983 and 1989, and was reelected president each year until 1991, when the National Assembly was dissolved. In addition to his political career, he was a writer and poet, best known for his work involved the oral tradition of several Malagasy ethnic groups.

== Early life and education ==
Michel-Andrianarahinjaka was born on 30 December 1929 in Fianarantsoa, in what was then the colony of French Madagascar. He was the son of Michel Joseph Randria (1903–1977), who was a member of the French Senate and the first mayor of Fianarantsoa Province.

From 1936 to 1948, he studied at the Collège Saint Joseph Ambodisaina in Fianarantsoa, and from 1948 to 1952 he went to school in Antananarivo, the capital city. Beginning in 1952, he studied at the Faculty of Letters at Paris-Sorbonne University. In 1981, he earned his Doctor of Philosophy at University of Bordeaux 3 (now Bordeaux Montaigne University).

== Political career ==
From 1976 to 1977 Michel-Andrianarahinjaka was the Charge for Information of Orientation and Relations with Institutions for the President's Council. He entered the Madagascar political scene that year, at the prompting of the Rassemblement Chrétien de Madagascar, his political party. In November 1976, he was one of the founding members of the Association for the Rebirth of Madagascar (AREMA).

Michel-Andrianarahinjaka ran as an AREMA candidate in the 1977 Malagasy parliamentary election. He was elected to the National Assembly, representing the Fianarantsoa II district. That same year, he was elected President of the National Assembly. He was reelected to the National Assembly in 1983 and 1989, and was reelected president every year from 1978 to 1991. In 1991, the National Assembly was dissolved, thus ending Michel-Andrianarahinjaka's term as an MP and president. In the end, he presided over the National Assembly for the entirety of the Second Republic of Madagascar.

Michel-Andrianarahinjaka died on 11 November 1997 in Fianarantsoa.

== Writing and poetry ==
Michel-Andrianarahinjaka was, in addition to his politics, a published writer and poet. He was notable for his work putting Madagascar's oral literature into writing, particularly the oral tradition of the Bara and Betsileo people. He was also a professor at the Établissement d'Enseignement Supérieur de Lettres in Antananarivo.

== Personal life ==
Michel-Andrianarahinjaka was married and had six children. He was Catholic, and his father, as a young man, was a teacher at a Catholic school.

== Bibliography ==
- Jean-Joseph Rabearivelo, cet inconnu ?: Actes du colloque du Comité universitaire pour la célébration du cinquentenaire de la mort du poète (1937–1987) (PDF). Marseille, France: Sud. 1990.
- La Litterature Traditionnelle Betsileo (PDF). Bordeaux, France: University of Bordeaux 3. 1981.
- Other publications by Michel-Andrianarahinjaka

== Awards and honors ==
Ribbon	Honor	Country	Year
	Order of La Pléiade	France	?

== See also ==
- List of Malagasy writers
