= 1992 Malagasy constitutional referendum =

1992 constitutional referendum in Madagascar

- 19 August 1992
- Do you support this constitution, which affirms national unity, stands for democracy and is intended to lead to the third republic?

Results
Choice	Votes	%
Yes	2,330,641	72.69%
No	875,485	27.31%
Valid votes	3,206,126	90.20%
Invalid or blank votes	348,470	9.80%
Total votes	3,554,596	100.00%
Registered voters/turnout	5,467,031	65.02%

A constitutional referendum was held in Madagascar on 19 August 1992. President Didier Ratsiraka, who had held power since 1975, conceded to the referendum that intended to balance the executive and legislative power and reduce the presidential power that Ratsiraka had accumulated. Ratsiraka agreed to the referendum in exchange for being permitted to run for re-election in the restructured government. The new constitution created a semi-presidential system and a Senate. It was approved by 73% of voters, with a 65% turnout, leading to the formation of the Third Republic of Madagascar.

== Background ==
Didier Ratsiraka had come to power in Madagascar after the assassination of Richard Ratsimandrava in 1975. A referendum in December 1975 simultaneously approved Ratsiraka's presidency and the formation of the Second Republic of Madagascar, known as the Democratic Republic of Madagascar (DRM). Although Ratsiraka's position was never fully stable, his opposition was divided throughout his rule, allowing him to maintain control of the country throughout the 1980s.

Ratsiraka was elected to a third term in 1989, but there were significant protests over the result. Over the next few years, the opposition joined together into the Living Forces (French: Forces Vives; FV), led by Albert Zafy. By 1991, the FV announced a provisional government in opposition to Ratsiraka. In response, FV leaders were arrested, abducted, or murdered. A peaceful protest in August was fired upon by government troops, killing around 100 protestors.

In late 1991 Ratsiraka's opposition had gained enough leverage to create the Panorama Agreement, a power-sharing proposal that Ratsiraka accepted. The agreement, finalized in January 1992, stripped the presidency of much of its power and created transitional institutions to begin the process of replacing the DRM with a Third Republic.

== Draft constitution ==
A draft constitution for the new republic was created soon after. The referendum was originally scheduled for June 1992, but was delayed to August due to ongoing unrest.

The vote was held on 19 August. The referendum passed with around three-quarters of voters approving it. The resulting constitution set up a semi-presidential system for the Third Republic, with the president as head of state and the prime minister as the head of the legislature. It also called for the creation of a Senate, but that body was never constituted before it was amended out of the constitution in 1998.

The first presidential election under this new constitution was held a few months later. The first round of presidential voting took place in November, with eight candidates. Zafy received the most votes (45%), but lacking an absolute majority, requiring a run-off. Zafy defeated Ratsiraka soundly in the top-two runoff, 67% to 33%, held in February 1993.

== Results ==
Choice	Votes	%
For	2,330,641	72.69
Against	875,485	27.31
Total	3,206,126	100.00
Valid votes	3,206,126	90.20
Invalid/blank votes	348,470	9.80
Total votes	3,554,596	100.00
Registered voters/turnout	5,467,031	65.02
Source: EISA, Thibaut
