= Malagasy Republic =

Government of Madagascar from 1958 to 1975

Coordinates: 18°56′S 47°31′E

Malagasy Republic Repoblika Malagasy (Malagasy) République malgache (French)
- 1958–1975
- Flag Emblem
- Motto: Fitiavana, Tanindrazana, Fandrosoana (Malagasy); Amour, Patrie, Progrès (French); "Love, Fatherland, Progress"
- Anthem: Ry Tanindrazanay malala ô! (Malagasy); Ô Terre de nos ancêtres bien-aimés! (French) "Oh, land of our beloved ancestors!"
- Location of the Malagasy Republic in Africa
- Capital: Tananarive
- Official languages: Malagasy; French
- Religion: Christianity; Traditional beliefs
- Government: Autonomous republic within the French Union (1958–1960); Unitary presidential republic (1960–1975): under a transitional military regime (1972–1975)
- High Commissioner
  - 1958–1959: André Soucadaux
- President
  - 1959–1972: Philibert Tsiranana
  - 1972–1975: Gabriel Ramanantsoa
  - 1975: Richard Ratsimandrava
  - 1975: Gilles Andriamahazo
  - 1975: Didier Ratsiraka
- Prime Minister
  - 1958–1959: Philibert Tsiranana
  - 1972–1975: Gabriel Ramanantsoa
- Legislature: Parliament
  - Upper house: Senate
  - Lower house: National Assembly
- Historical era: Cold War
  - Established: October 14 1958
  - Detachment of the Îles Éparses: April 1, 1960
  - Independence: June 26, 1960
  - Disestablished: December 30 1975

Area
- 1961: 587,040 km^{2} (226,660 sq mi)
- 1975: 587,040 km^{2} (226,660 sq mi)

Population
  - 1961: 5,590,000
  - 1975: 7,568,577
- Currency: Madagascar-Comores CFA franc (1960–1963); Malagasy franc (ariary) (1963–1975)
- ISO 3166 code: MG
Preceded by
French Madagascar
Succeeded by
Democratic Republic of Madagascar
Banc du Geyser
Bassas da India
Europa Island
Glorioso Islands
Juan de Nova Island
- Today part of: Madagascar; French Southern and Antarctic Lands

The Malagasy Republic (Malagasy: Repoblika Malagasy, French: République malgache) was a state situated in Southeast Africa on the island of Madagascar. It was established in 1958 as an autonomous republic within the newly created French Community, became fully independent in 1960, and existed until the proclamation of the Democratic Republic of Madagascar in 1975.

== History ==
After France adopted the Constitution of the Fifth Republic under the leadership of General Charles de Gaulle, on September 28, 1958, a referendum was held in the Colony of Madagascar to determine whether the country should become a self-governing republic within the French Community. The AKFM and other nationalists opposed to the concept of limited self-rule mustered about 25 percent of votes cast. The vast majority of the population, at the urging of the Social Democratic Party of Madagascar and the Comoros (PSD) leadership, voted in favor. The vote led to the election of Philibert Tsiranana as the country's first president on April 27, 1959. After a year of negotiations between Tsiranana and his French counterparts, Madagascar's status as a self-governing republic officially was altered on June 26, 1960, to that of a fully independent and sovereign liberal democratic state. The cornerstone of Tsiranana's government was the signing with France of fourteen agreements and conventions designed to maintain and strengthen Franco-Malagasy ties. These agreements were to provide the basis for increasing opposition from Tsiranana's critics.

A spirit of political reconciliation prevailed in the early 1960s. By achieving independence and obtaining the release of the MDRM leaders detained since the Revolt of 1947, Tsiranana had co-opted the chief issues on which the more aggressively nationalist elements had built much of their support. Tsiranana made plain his intent to maintain strong ties to France and the West in economic, military, and cultural spheres. Not entirely sanguine about this prospect, the opposition initially concurred in the interest of consolidating the gains of the previous decade, and most ethnic and regional interests supported Tsiranana.

Similar to other African leaders during the immediate independence era, Tsiranana oversaw the consolidation of his own party's power at the expense of the others. A political system that strongly favored the incumbent complemented these actions. For example, although the political process allowed minority parties to participate, the constitution mandated a winner-take-all system that effectively denied the opposition a voice in governance. Tsiranana's position was further strengthened by the broad, multiethnic popular base of the PSD among the côtiers, whereas the opposition was severely disorganized. The AKFM continued to experience intraparty rifts between leftist and ultranationalist, more orthodox Marxist factions; it was unable to capitalize on increasingly active but relatively less privileged Malagasy youth because the party's base was the Merina middle class.

A new force on the political scene provided the first serious challenge to the Tsiranana government in April 1971. The National Movement for the Independence of Madagascar (Mouvement National pour l'Indépendance de Madagascar – Monima) led a peasant uprising in Toliara Province. The creator and leader of Monima was Monja Jaona, a côtier from the south who also participated in the Revolt of 1947. The main issue was government pressure for tax collection at a time when local cattle herds were being ravaged by disease. The protesters attacked military and administrative centers in the area, apparently hoping for support in the form of weapons and reinforcements from China. Such help never arrived, and the revolt was harshly and quickly suppressed. An estimated fifty to 1,000 persons died, Monima was dissolved, and Monima leaders, including Jaona and several hundred protesters, were arrested and deported to the island of Nosy Lava.

Another movement came on the scene in early 1972, in the form of student protests in Antananarivo. A general strike involving the nation's roughly 100,000 secondary-level students focused on three principal issues: ending the cultural cooperation agreements with France; replacing educational programs designed for schools in France and taught by French teachers with programs emphasizing Malagasy life and culture and taught by Malagasy instructors; and increasing access for economically underprivileged youth to secondary-level institutions. By early May, the PSD sought to end the student strike at any cost; on May 12 and 13, the government arrested several hundred student leaders and sent them to Nosy Lava. Authorities also closed the schools and banned demonstrations.

Mounting economic stagnation – as revealed in scarcities of investment capital, a general decline in living standards, and the failure to meet even modest development goals – further undermined the government's position. Forces unleashed by the growing economic crisis combined with student unrest to create an opposition alliance. Workers, public servants, peasants, and many unemployed urban youth of Antananarivo joined the student strike, which spread to the provinces. Protesters set fire to the town hall and to the offices of a French-language newspaper in the capital.

The turning point occurred on May 13 when the Republican Security Force (Force Républicaine de Sécurité – FRS) opened fire on the rioters; in the ensuing melee between fifteen and forty persons were killed and about 150 injured. Tsiranana declared a state of national emergency and on May 18 dissolved his government, effectively ending the First Republic. He then turned over full power to the National Army under the command of General Gabriel Ramanantsoa, a politically conservative Merina and former career officer in the French army. The National Army had maintained strict political neutrality in the crisis, and its intervention to restore order was welcomed by protesters and opposition elements.

The Ramanantsoa military regime could not resolve rising economic and ethnic problems, and narrowly survived an attempted coup d'état on December 31, 1974. The fact that the coup was led by several côtier officers against a Merina military leader underscored the growing Merina/côtier polarization in the military. In an attempt at restoring unity, Ramanantsoa, on February 5, 1975, turned over power to Colonel Richard Ratsimandrava (a Merina with a less "aristocratic" background). Five days later, Ratsimandrava was assassinated, and a National Military Directorate was formed to restore order by declaring martial law, strictly censoring political expression, and suspending all political parties.

The political transition crisis was resolved on June 15, 1975, when the National Military Directorate selected Lieutenant Commander Didier Ratsiraka as head of state and president of a new ruling body, the Supreme Revolutionary Council (SRC). The choice of Ratsiraka allayed ethnic concerns because he was a côtier belonging to the Betsimisaraka ethnic group. In addition, Ratsiraka – a dedicated socialist – was perceived by his military peers as a consensus candidate capable of forging unity among the various leftist political parties (such as AKFM and Monima), students, urban workers, the peasantry, and the armed forces.

== See also ==
- Madagascar
- History of Madagascar
