= List of presidents of Madagascar =

President for the Re-Foundation of the Republic of Madagascar
- Filohan’ny fanorenana indray ny Repoblikan’i Madagasikara (Malagasy); Président de la Refondation de la république de Madagascar (French)
- Presidential Standard

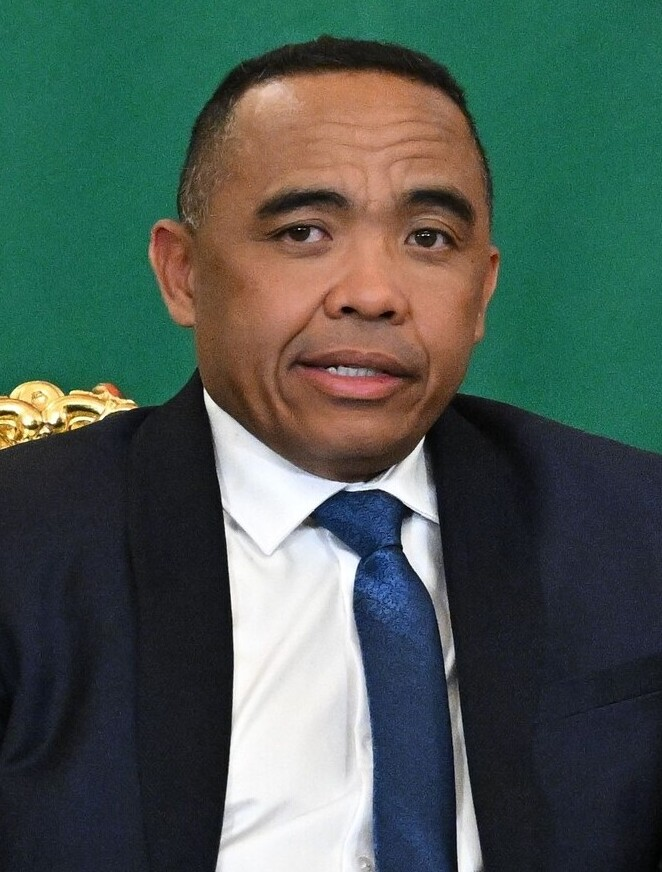
- Incumbent; Michael Randrianirina since 17 October 2025
- Style: President; His Excellency
- Status: Head of state Commander-in-chief
- Residence: Iavoloha Palace; Ambohitsorohitra Palace
- Seat: Antananarivo
- Inaugural holder: Philibert Tsiranana
- Formation: 1 May 1959; 67 years ago
- Website: Presidence

This is a list of presidents of Madagascar, since the establishment of the office of President in 1959, during the Malagasy Republic. The president is the head of state and the Commander-in-Chief of the armed forces. The position has been held by Michael Randrianirina since 17 October 2025, who is styled as President for the Re-Foundation of the Republic of Madagascar.

== Succession ==
In case of a vacancy, the president of the Senate will act as a temporary successor of the president. After the 2025 military coup, Colonel Michael Randrianirina was appointed as president.

== List of officeholders ==
Political parties

Social Democratic Party (PSD)
Malagasy Revolutionary Party (AREMA)
National Union for Democracy and Development (UNDD)
Judged by Your Work Party (AVI)
I Love Madagascar (TIM)
Young Malagasies Determined (TGV)
Hery Vaovao ho an'i Madagasikara (HVM)

Other factions

Military
Independent

Status

Denotes Acting President

No.	Portrait	Name (Birth–Death)	Elected	Term of office			Political party	Prime minister(s)
No.	Portrait	Name (Birth–Death)	Elected	Took office	Left office	Time in office	Political party	Prime minister(s)
Malagasy Republic (within the French Community)
—		Philibert Tsiranana (1912–1978)	—	1 May 1959	26 June 1960	1 year, 56 days	PSD	Position abolished
Malagasy Republic (independent country)
1		Philibert Tsiranana (1912–1978)	1965; 1972	26 June 1960	11 October 1972 (Resigned) (Note: Stepped down amidst massive political protests, and handed over power to the military (after the referendum on military rule).)	12 years, 107 days	PSD	Ramanantsoa
2		Gabriel Ramanantsoa (1906–1979) (Note: Styled as Head of State.)	1972 (referendum)	11 October 1972	5 February 1975 (Resigned)	2 years, 117 days	Military	Himself
—		Richard Ratsimandrava (1931–1975)	—	5 February 1975	11 February 1975 (Assassinated)	6 days	Military	Position abolished
—		Gilles Andriamahazo (1919–1989) (Note: Styled as Chairman of the National Military Leadership Committee.)	—	12 February 1975	15 June 1975	123 days	Military	Position abolished
—		Didier Ratsiraka (1936–2021) (Note: Styled as Chairman of the Supreme Revolutionary Council.)	—	15 June 1975	30 December 1975	198 days	Military	Position abolished
Democratic Republic of Madagascar
3		Didier Ratsiraka (1936–2021) (Note: Styled as Chairman of the Supreme Revolutionary Council until 4 January 1976.)	1982; 1989	30 December 1975	12 January 1992	16 years, 13 days	Military / AREMA	Rakotomalala; Rakotoniaina; Rakotoarijaona; Ramahatra; Razanamasy
Third Republic of Madagascar
(3)		Didier Ratsiraka (1936–2021)	—	12 January 1992	27 March 1993	1 year, 74 days	AREMA	Razanamasy
4		Albert Zafy (1927–2017)	1992–93	27 March 1993	5 September 1996 (Resigned)	3 years, 162 days	UNDD	Razanamasy; Ravony; Rakotovahiny; Ratsirahonana
—		Norbert Ratsirahonana (born 1938)	—	5 September 1996	9 February 1997	157 days	AVI	Himself
5		Didier Ratsiraka (1936–2021)	1996	9 February 1997	(25 February 2002) (Note: Based in Toamasina.); 5 July 2002	5 years, 146 days	AREMA	Ratsirahonana; Rakotomavo; Andrianarivo; Rasolondraibe
6		Marc Ravalomanana (born 1949)	2001; 2006	(22 February 2002) (Note: Based in Antananarivo.); 5 July 2002	17 March 2009 (Deposed)	6 years, 255 days	TIM	Sylla; Rabemananjara
—		Hyppolite Ramaroson (born 1951) (Note: Served as acting president as Head of the Military Directorate.)	—	17 March 2009		Several hours	Military	Position vacant
High Transitional Authority
—		Andry Rajoelina (born 1974)	—	(7 February 2009); 17 March 2009	25 January 2014	4 years, 314 days	TGV	Roindefo; Mangalaza; Manorohanta; Vital; Beriziky
Fourth Republic of Madagascar
7		Hery Rajaonarimampianina (born 1958)	2013	25 January 2014	7 September 2018	4 years, 225 days	HVM	Beriziky; Kolo; Ranelonarivo; Solonandrasana; Ntsay
—		Rivo Rakotovao (born 1960)	—	7 September 2018	19 January 2019	134 days	HVM	Ntsay
8		Andry Rajoelina (born 1974)	2018	19 January 2019	9 September 2023	4 years, 233 days	TGV	Ntsay
—		Christian Ntsay (born 1961)	—	9 September 2023	27 October 2023	48 days	Independent	Himself
—		Richard Ravalomanana (born 1959)	—	27 October 2023	16 December 2023	50 days	TGV	Ntsay
(8)		Andry Rajoelina (born 1974)	2023	16 December 2023	14 October 2025 (Note: Fled the country amidst the 2025 Malagasy protests and the 2025 Malagasy coup d'état. Impeached by the National Assembly after a failed dissolution attempt.)	1 year, 302 days	TGV	Ntsay; Zafisambo
Council of the Presidency for the Re-Foundation of the Republic of Madagascar
—		Michael Randrianirina (born 1974) (Note: Serving as President of the Council of the Presidency for the Re-Foundation of the Republic of Madagascar since 14 October 2025.)	—	17 October 2025	Incumbent	1 year, 3 days	Military	Zafisambo; Rajaonarivelo; Rajaonarison

== Term of office in years ==
This is a list of each president (excluding acting presidents) in order of term length.

Of the 7 people that has served as president, only two, Didier Ratsiraka and Andry Rajoelina, served in non consecutive periods.

Rank	President	Political party	Longest continuous term	Total time in office	Periods
1	Didier Ratsiraka	Military/AREMA	17 years, 285 days	23 years, 66 days	2
2	Philibert Tsiranana	PSD	13 years, 163 days	13 years, 163 days	1
3	Andry Rajoelina	TGV	4 years, 314 days	11 years, 119 days	3
4	Marc Ravalomanana	TIM	6 years, 255 days	6 years, 255 days	1
5	Hery Rajaonarimampianina	HVM	4 years, 225 days	4 years, 225 days	1
6	Albert Zafy	UNDD	3 years, 162 days	3 years, 162 days	1
7	Gabriel Ramanantsoa	Military	2 years, 117 days	2 years, 117 days	1

== Incoming election ==
A presidential election in Madagascar is scheduled for September 2027, within two years of the 2025 coup d'état. Until then, Madagascar will be governed by a transitional government led by President Michael Randrianirina. The most recent Malagasy presidential election was held in 2023, and Andry Rajoelina was re-elected.

== See also ==
- Politics of Madagascar
- List of Imerina monarchs
- List of colonial governors of Madagascar
- Prime Minister of Madagascar
- Vice President of Madagascar
- First Lady of Madagascar
