= 1983 Malagasy parliamentary election =

Parliamentary elections were held in Madagascar on 28 August 1983, having originally been scheduled for 1982, but delayed by the presidential election and the "economic difficulties facing the country". Only parties affiliated with the AREMA-dominated National Front for the Defense of the Revolution were allowed to compete in the election. AREMA was the only party to field candidates in all 137 constituencies, and won 117 of them with over 65% of the vote.

Voter turnout was 73%.

== Results ==
| Party | Votes | % | Seats | +/– |
|---|---|---|---|---|
| AREMA | 2,239,771 | 65.26 | 117 | +5 |
| Movement for Proletarian Power | 372,842 | 10.86 | 3 | New |
| Popular Movement for National Unity | 364,640 | 10.62 | 6 | –1 |
| Congress Party for the Independence of Madagascar | 300,809 | 8.76 | 9 | –7 |
| Madagascar for the Malagasy | 126,452 | 3.68 | 2 | New |
| MONIMA Socialist Organization | 15,727 | 0.46 | 0 | New |
| Malagasy Christian Democratic Union | 12,022 | 0.35 | 0 | –2 |
| Total | 3,432,263 | 100.00 | 137 | 0 |
| Valid votes | 3,432,263 | 97.51 | | |
| Invalid/blank votes | 87,734 | 2.49 | | |
| Total votes | 3,519,997 | 100.00 | | |
| Registered voters/turnout | 4,838,279 | 72.75 | | |
Source: EISA
