= Charter of the Malagasy Socialist Revolution =

- Author: Didier Ratsiraka
- Original title: Charte de la Révolution Socialiste Malagasy
- Language: French
- Publication place: Democratic Republic of Madagascar
- OCLC: 82176250
- Dewey Decimal: 361.6109691
- LC Class: HC895 .R38

The Charter of the Malagasy Socialist Revolution (French: Charte de la Révolution Socialiste Malagasy) was the guiding document of the Democratic Republic of Madagascar, established by the "Red Admiral" Didier Ratsiraka, President of Madagascar and head of the Supreme Revolutionary Council from 1975 to 1993. The Charter was commonly known as the Red Book (Malagasy: Boky Mena) or the Little Red Book due to the colour of the standard issue's cover (and in possible reference to the Quotations from Chairman Mao Tse-tung, known popularly as Mao's Little Red Book).

The book's contents were formed from a number of speeches held by Ratsiraka after taking power, starting with a first proclamation on 16 June stating that "the only way to achieve development is socialism", followed by a long speech defining the new government's ideological orientation, broadcast over several days in August and September and later edited together to form the Charter of the Malagasy Socialist Revolution. Within the newly renamed Democratic Republic, the book formally had supra-constitutional authority.

According to the Charter, the primary goal of the newly renamed Democratic Republic was to build a "new society" founded on socialist principles and guided by the actions of the "five pillars of the revolution", which were the Supreme Revolutionary Council, peasants and workers, young intellectuals, women, and the Popular Armed Forces. "The socialist revolution," explained the Red Book, "is the only choice possible for us in order to achieve rapid economic and cultural development in an autonomous, humane, and harmonious manner." Other principles the book focused on were diplomatic non-alignment and anti-colonialism.

Most of the policies enacted by Ratsiraka under the guidance of the "Red Book" were retracted after only a few years. The island's de facto single-party rule gradually started cracking, especially after the fall of the Berlin Wall in 1989, and in 1992 the still officially socialist regime was replaced with the Third Republic of Madagascar.

== See also ==
- History of Madagascar
- The Green Book of Muammar Gaddafi
- Quotations from Chairman Mao Tse-tung
