= Ministry of National Defense (Madagascar) =

Malagasy government ministry responsible for military and defense affairs

- Ministère de la Défense Nationale (French)
- Coat of arms of Madagascar

Agency overview
- Formed: May 1972; 54 years ago
- Jurisdiction: Government of Madagascar
- Minister responsible: Maminirina Ely Razafitombo
- Website: Official website

The Ministry of National Defense (French: Ministère de la Défense Nationale) is a ministry of the Government of Madagascar. This ministry is responsible for military and defense of the country.

== History ==
On February 10, 2021, the council of ministers in the Malagasy Ministry of National Defense voted to adopt a decree that would establish a new intervention unit in the Malagasy Armed Forces, called the Special Intervention Forces Group (Malagasy: Groupement des Forces spéciales d’intervention, GFSI). It was indicated that this unit would be made up of mixed elements from the Malagasy Army, Madagascar Navy, and Malagasy Air Force. The GFSI was officially established on October 19, 2023, which is responsible for defending national institutions and national sovereignty, combating dahalo and abduction, and assist in dismantling networks of traffickers of national resources.

== List of ministers ==
Name	Tenure
Gen. Gabriel Ramanantsoa	May 1972 – February 1975
Col. Richard Ratsimandrava	February 1975
Gen. Gilles Andriamahazo	February – June 1975
Lt-Cdr. Didier Ratsiraka	June 1975 – January 1976
Col. Joel Rakotomalala	January – August 1976
Lt-Col. Mampila Joana	August 1976 – 1977
Adm. Guy-Albert Sibon	1977–1986
Gen. Mahasampo Raveloson	1986–1991
Gen. Evariste Razafitombo	February – August 1991
Gen. Jean Ravelomitsanga	August – November 1991
Gen. Désiré Ramakavelo	November 1991 – August 1993
Gen. Charles Louis Rabenja	August 1993 – November 1995
Gen. Jackson Tiamana	November 1995 – June 1996
Gen. Marcel Ranjeva	June 1996 – March 2002
Gen. Jules Mamizara	April 2002 – January 2004
Gen. Petera Behajaina	February 2004 – March 2007
Cécile Manorohanta (Note: First woman and first civilian to hold this office.)	April 2007 – February 2009
Adm. Mamy Ranaivoniarivo	March – April 2009
Gen. Noêl Girardin Rakotonandrasana	April 2009 – April 2010
Gen. André Lucien Rakotoarimasy	May 2010
Gen. Dominique Jean Olivier Rakotozafy	April 2014 – 2015
Dominique Jean Olivier Rakotozafy	2015 – 2016
Béni Xavier Rasolofonirina	2016 – 2017
Dominique Jean Olivier Rakotozafy	2017
Béni Xavier Rasolofonirina	2017 – 2019
Richard Rakotonirina	2019 – 2023
Josoa Rakotoarijaona	2023 – 2024
Lala Monja Delphin Sahivelo	2024–2025
Deramasinjaka Manantsoa Rakotoarivelo	2025
Maminirina Ely Razafitombo	2025 - Incumbent

== See also ==
- Cabinet of Madagascar
- Madagascar Armed Forces
