= Manandafy Rakotonirina =

Malagasy politician (1938–2019)

Manandafy Rakotonirina (30 October 1938 – 15 March 2019) was a Malagasy politician. He had been a significant political figure in Madagascar since the 1970s, and in April 2009 he was appointed as prime minister by ousted president Marc Ravalomanana.

== Early life ==
Born in Fandriana, Amoron'i Mania, he received his primary and secondary education in Ambositra and Antsirabe and attended the University of Antananarivo. He then became an assistant at the Ecole Nationale Supérieure d'Agronomie and a Professor of Sociology. As a convinced socialist, he joined the Madagasikara Otronin'ny Malagasy party, within which he called for the involvement of the proletariat of Antananarivo.

== Political career ==
Rakotonirina was in favor of a popular uprising, and in April 1971 he was arrested. He helped organize the May 1972 protests against President Philibert Tsiranana. On 27 December 1972, he founded the Movement for Proletarian Power (MFM) with Rakotonirainy Germain. In May 1973, he was again arrested in connection with a commemoration of May 1972.

Although the MFM did not actively oppose the regime of Didier Ratsiraka when it came to power in 1975, Ratsiraka dissolved the party in September 1976 and Rakotonirina was placed under house arrest, which lasted until January 1977. Following this, he agreed to reform his party within the ruling National Front for the Defence of the Revolution coalition; he became a member of the Supreme Council of the Revolution and was entrusted with heading the Economic Commission.

Rakotonirina later contested the March 1989 presidential election, receiving just under 20% of the vote and taking second place, behind Ratsiraka. From late 1991 to 1993, he was co-president of the transitional Committee for Economic and Social Recovery along with Richard Andriamanjato. Rakotonirina was a candidate in the November 1992 presidential election, taking third place with 10.2% of the votes cast, behind Albert Zafy and Ratsiraka. He was elected to the National Assembly from Manandrina in the 1993 parliamentary election, serving until 1998. He was a candidate for prime minister in the National Assembly vote on 9 August 1993, but came in third place, receiving 32 votes against 55 for the winner, Francisque Ravony, and 46 for Roger Ralison (both of whom were from the pro-Zafy Committee of Active Forces).

Rakotonirina's party had moved towards liberalism, and it renamed itself the Militant Party for the Development of Madagascar. He continued to lead the party. In 2001, he played a major role in convincing Marc Ravalomanana to claim a majority in the first round of the presidential election and to refuse to participate in a second round of voting. His alternative strategy of taking to the streets proved ultimately successful; Ravalomanana took over the Presidency, and Rakotonirina became a Special Advisor to the President.

Later, Rakotonirina stood against Ravalomanana in the December 2006 presidential election. In the election, he received only 0.33% of the votes after experiencing difficulties distributing ballots to polling stations. After being prevented from taking ballot papers to stations on the day of the election, he refused to cast his own vote and called for the election to be held over again.

== 2006 Malagasy presidential election ==
He was candidate for the 2006 presidential elections but failed with 0.33% of the votes (14.712 votes).

== 2009 Malagasy political crisis ==
President Ravalomanana was forced out of office by popular protests led by Andry Rajoelina and military intervention in March 2009. He nevertheless insisted that he was the legitimate president, and on 16 April 2009 he announced from exile that he was appointing Rakotonirina as prime minister. Ravalomanana made this announcement by phone at a rally of his supporters in Antananarivo, with Rakotonirina in attendance. Rakotonirina subsequently began working out of the Carlton hotel in Antananarivo, and he appointed ministers to occupy the key government portfolios on 28 April; he assigned himself responsibility for national defense. Soldiers with a warrant for Rakotonirina's arrest stormed the Carlton and arrested him on 29 April; they found him hiding in a bathroom after searching for about an hour. A spokesperson for Rajoelina described Rakotonirina as "the mastermind of last week's violence".

Rakotonirina was placed under house arrest and put on trial for various charges, including incitement of disorder and usurpation of public office. He was, however, released from house arrest so that he could participate in talks between the Malagasy political factions that were held in Maputo later in 2009 and were aimed at producing a political agreement to resolve the crisis. Subsequently, on 22 September 2009, Rakotonirina received a two-year suspended sentence.
