= 1972 Malagasy presidential election =

| ← 1965 | 30 January 1972 | 1982 → |
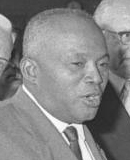
| Nominee | Philibert Tsiranana |
| Party | PSD |
| Percentage | 99.7% |
President before election
Philibert Tsiranana
PSD
Elected President
Gabriel Ramanantsoa
PSD

Presidential elections were held in Madagascar on 30 January 1972. Incumbent President Philibert Tsiranana of the Social Democratic Party was the only candidate, and won the approval of 99.7% of voters. However, public unrest led to him handing over power to General Gabriel Ramanantsoa. Ramanantsoa put forward proposals for a five-year transition period during which the National Assembly would be suspended. The plans were approved in a referendum later in the year.

== Results ==
| Candidate | Party | Votes | % |
|---|---|---|---|
| Philibert Tsiranana | Social Democratic Party | | 99.7 |
| Against | | | 0.3 |
| Total | | | |
Source: EISA
