= 1989 Malagasy parliamentary election =

Parliamentary elections were held in Madagascar on 28 May 1989. Only parties affiliated with the AREMA-dominated National Front for the Defense of the Revolution were allowed to compete in the election, and AREMA won 120 of the 137 seats.

Voter turnout was 75% of the 5,741,974 registered voters.

== Results ==
Party	Votes	%	Seats	+/–
AREMA	2,785,448	66.84	120	+3
Movement for Proletarian Power	460,268	11.04	7	+4
Popular Movement for National Unity	404,959	9.72	4	–2
Congress Party for the Independence of Madagascar	256,255	6.15	2	–7
Congress Party for the Independence of Madagascar – Renewal	175,824	4.22	3	New
Madagascar for the Malagasy	66,627	1.60	1	–1
Malagasy Christian Democratic Union	17,974	0.43	0	0
Total	4,167,355	100.00	137	0
Valid votes	4,167,355	97.29		
Invalid/blank votes	116,154	2.71		
Total votes	4,283,509	100.00		
Registered voters/turnout	5,741,974	74.60		
Source: EISA
