= Madagascar–Vietnam relations =

Malagasy - Vietnamese relations
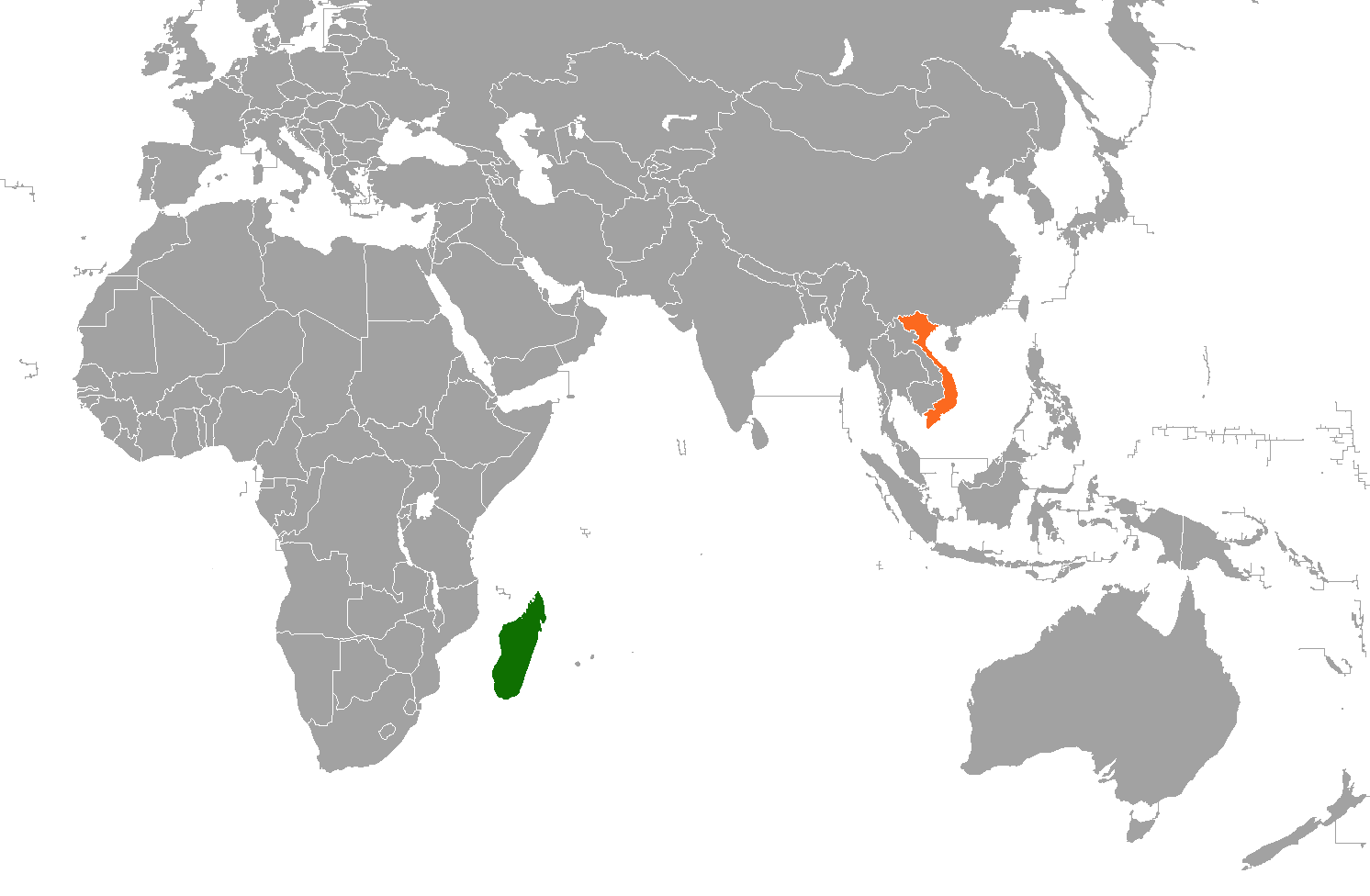
- Madagascar: Vietnam

Madagascar–Vietnam relations refer to the bilateral relations between Madagascar and Vietnam. The two countries established official relations since 1972, Madagascar's embassy in Beijing, China functions as the non-resident embassy to Vietnam, while Vietnam is accredited to Madagascar through its embassy in Maputo, Mozambique. Both countries are full members of the Organisation internationale de la Francophonie, Group of 77 and Non-Aligned Movement.

== History ==
Both countries were part of French colonial empire from late 19th century until mid-20th century, and have enjoyed relative close relations after the establishment of Democratic Republic of Madagascar in 1975. Vietnam opened a resident embassy in Antananarivo in the next year but was closed in 1990 citing financial difficulties. In 2016, Vietnam opened an honorary-consulate in Antananarivo.

In 1979, during the Sino-Vietnamese War, Madagascar appealed Vietnam and China to solve the conflict by negotiation. In 1999, The Vietnamese government sent 80 experts, industrial technicians and reproductive products to work in Madagascar synchronized sideways with FAO's sponsors. In 2003, Vietnam and Madagascar signed an agreement on the co-operation of the Economics, Commerce, Culture, Science and Technology.

== Migration ==
There is a small Vietnamese community in Madagascar.
