= Michel Randria =

Malagasy teacher and politician

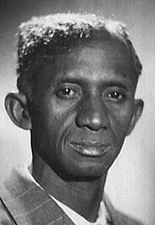
- Michel Randria in 1948

Senator of French Madagascar
- In office 24 December 1948 – 18 May 1952

Personal details
- Born: 1 June 1903 Fianarantsoa, Madagascar
- Died: 1 December 1977 (aged 74) Fianarantsoa, Madagascar
- Occupation: Teacher and politician

Michel Randria (1 June 1903 – 1 December 1977) was a Malagasy teacher and politician who was a senator for French Madagascar from 1948 to 1952.

== Life ==
Michel Randria was born on 1 June 1903 in Fianarantsoa, in Betsileo country in the south of the central highlands of Madagascar. He became a teacher at the Catholic mission of Fianarantsoa. He married Marie Julienne Razanatsoa, who gave him thirteen children, of whom three died in infancy.

On 24 December 1948 Randria ran for election to the Council of the Republic as a candidate on the list of Félix Totolehibe's Parti des déshérités de Madagascar (PADESM). The party won 48 of 61 votes and Randria was declared elected. He joined the Independent Republicans group and was a member of the Committee on the Family, Population and Public Health until January 1952, when he joined the committee on Food. In a written question to the Senate in 1950 Randria asked for education to be made compulsory in all provinces for a given radius around each school, and for collaboration between official and private education to be encouraged. In February 1952 he published an article in Le Monde in which he called for better technical education and better geographical distribution of schools in Madagascar. He ran for reelection in May 1952 but was not successful.

The Rassemblement Chrétien Malagache (RCM) was formed at a meeting in Tamatave with Randria as president, but due to disputes among the church leaders it did not gain much influence. Randria founded the Mouvement Travailliste Chrétien (MTC: Christian Labor Movement) in the 1950s, which merged with other parties at the start of independence to form the Manjaka Vahoaka party. He was elected mayor of Fianarantsoa in 1957 as the Manjaka Vahoaka candidate, and was reelected in 1969, but was dismissed by a decree of the PSD-dominated Council of Ministers a few months later. He acted as adviser to his eldest son, Lucien Xavier Michel-Andrianarahinjaka, who became President of the National Assembly of the Democratic Republic of Madagascar. Michel Randria died on 1 December 1977 in Fianarantsoa at the age of 74.

== Publications ==
- Randria, Dr. Michel (1962), Tantaran i Madagasikara sy ny Malagasy nosorotan (History of Madagascar and the Malagasy) (in Malagasy), Imprimerie Ny Nosy
- Randria, Michel (1968), Foto-teny malagasy (in Malagasy), Hery

== Sources ==
- Brown, Mervyn (1995), A History of Madagascar, Damien Tunnacliffe, ISBN 978-0-9506284-5-5
- Goguel, Anne Marie (2006), Aux origines du mai malgache: désir d'école et compétition sociale, 1951-1972 (in French), KARTHALA Editions, ISBN 978-2-84586-761-1
- collectif (2005), "RANDRIA (Michel)", Dictionnaire des parlementaires français 1940–1958
