= 1977 Malagasy parliamentary election =

- 30 June 1977

All 137 seats in the National Assembly 69 seats needed for a majority
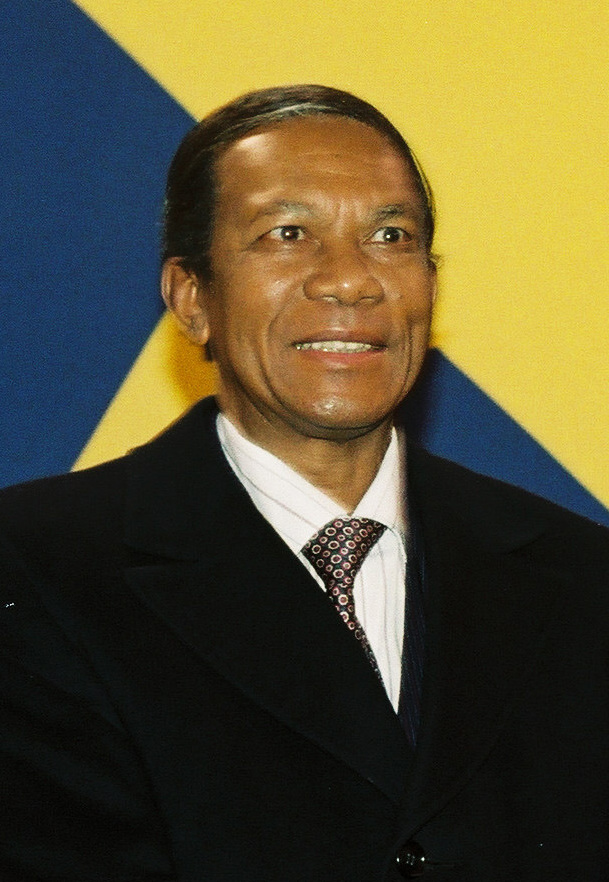
| Leader | Didier Ratsiraka |
| Alliance | FNDR |
| Seats won | 137 |
| Percentage | 92% |

Parliamentary elections were held in Madagascar on 30 June 1977. They were the first elections held under the constitution adopted in the 1975 referendum, which banned all political parties not affiliated with the National Front for the Defense of the Revolution.

Prior to the elections, the National Movement for the Independence of Madagascar left the National Front, and did not take part in the elections. The remaining four parties were assigned all 137 seats in the National People's Assembly, and voters were asked to approve the list. The Malagasy Revolutionary Party was assigned 112 seats, the Congress Party for the Independence of Madagascar 16, the Popular Movement for National Unity seven and the Malagasy Christian Democratic Union two. The list was approved by 92% of voters.

== Results ==
| Party or alliance | | Votes | % | Seats |
|---|---|---|---|---|
| National Front for the Defense of the Revolution | Malagasy Revolutionary Party | | 92 | 112 |
| National Front for the Defense of the Revolution | Congress Party for the Independence of Madagascar | | 92 | 16 |
| National Front for the Defense of the Revolution | Popular Movement for National Unity | | 92 | 7 |
| National Front for the Defense of the Revolution | Malagasy Christian Democratic Union | | 92 | 2 |
| National Front for the Defense of the Revolution | Total | | 92 | 137 |
| Against | | | 8 | – |
| Total | | | | 137 |
| Registered voters/turnout | | | 90 | |
Source: EISA
