= 1992–93 Malagasy presidential election =

← 1989	25 November 1992 (first round); 10 February 1993 (second round)	1996 →
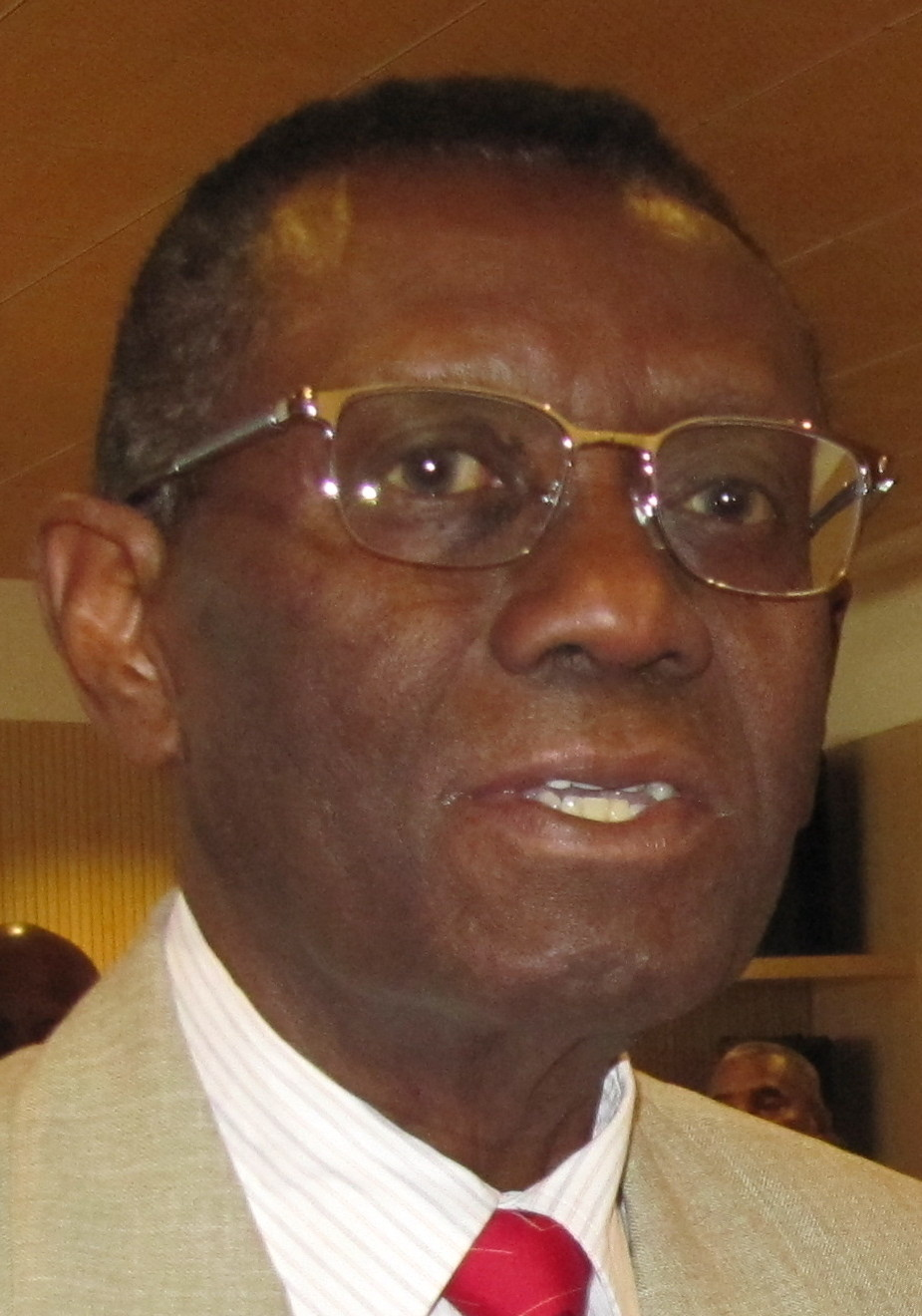

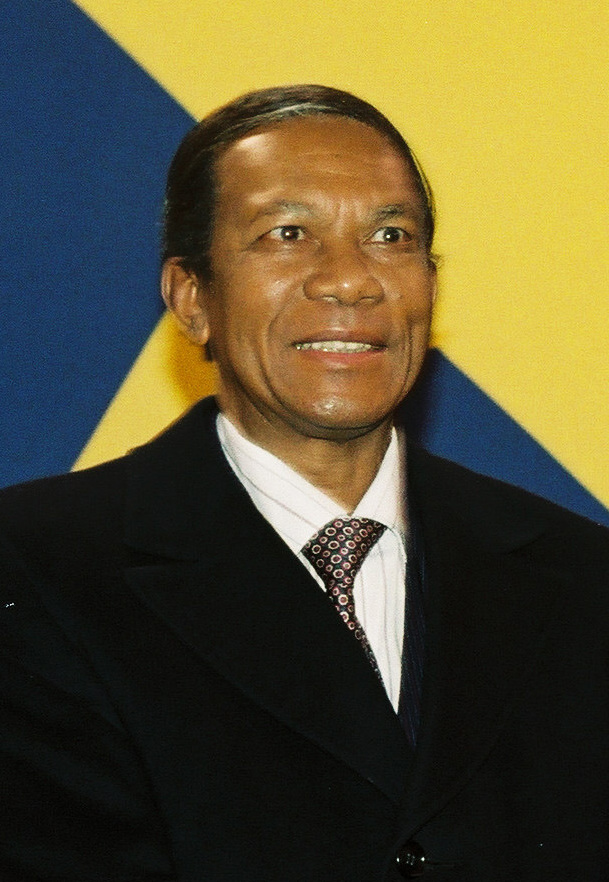
Nominee	Albert Zafy	Didier Ratsiraka
Party	UNDD	AREMA
Popular vote	2,766,704	1,378,640
Percentage	66.74%	33.26%
President before election
Didier Ratsiraka
AREMA
President
Albert Zafy
UNDD

Presidential elections were held in Madagascar on 25 November 1992, with a run-off between the top two contenders on 10 February 1993. Incumbent President Didier Ratsiraka of AREMA lost the election to Albert Zafy, leader of the National Union for Development and Democracy in the second round after neither candidate reached 50% in the first round.

Voter turnout was 74.43% for the first round and 68.49% for the second.

== Results ==
Candidate	Party	First round		Second round	
Candidate	Party	Votes	%	Votes	%
Albert Zafy	National Union for Development and Democracy	2,024,841	45.94	2,766,704	66.74
Didier Ratsiraka	AREMA	1,260,193	28.59	1,378,640	33.26
Manandafy Rakotonirina	Movement for Proletarian Power	444,288	10.08		
Marson Evariste	Rally for Socialism and Democracy	205,204	4.66		
Ruffine Tsiranana	Social Democratic Party	152,952	3.47		
Jacques Rabemananjara	Independent	124,901	2.83		
Nirina Andriamanalina	Independent	98,574	2.24		
Tovonanahary Rabetsitonta	Action and Reflection Group for the Development of Madagascar	96,445	2.19		
Total		4,407,398	100.00	4,145,344	100.00
Valid votes		4,407,398	97.79	4,145,344	96.34
Invalid/blank votes		99,595	2.21	157,319	3.66
Total votes		4,506,993	100.00	4,302,663	100.00
Registered voters/turnout		6,054,966	74.43	6,282,564	68.49
Source: EISA
