= Elysé Ratsiraka =

Elysé Ratsiraka is a Malagasy politician and a medical practitioner.

He was the Minister of Energy in the government Vital after the 2009 Coup d'Etat. He is the Vice-President of the MAPAR party. He was the brother of former Malagasy President Didier Ratsiraka.

In 2015 he was elected Mayor of Toamasina until his destitution in 2019.

He was condemned to pay a fine of 6 million Ariary in January 2023 by the anti-corruption court for having sold illegally properties belonging to the city.
