= 1989 Malagasy presidential election =

← 1982	12 March 1989	1992–93 →
- Turnout: 81.04%
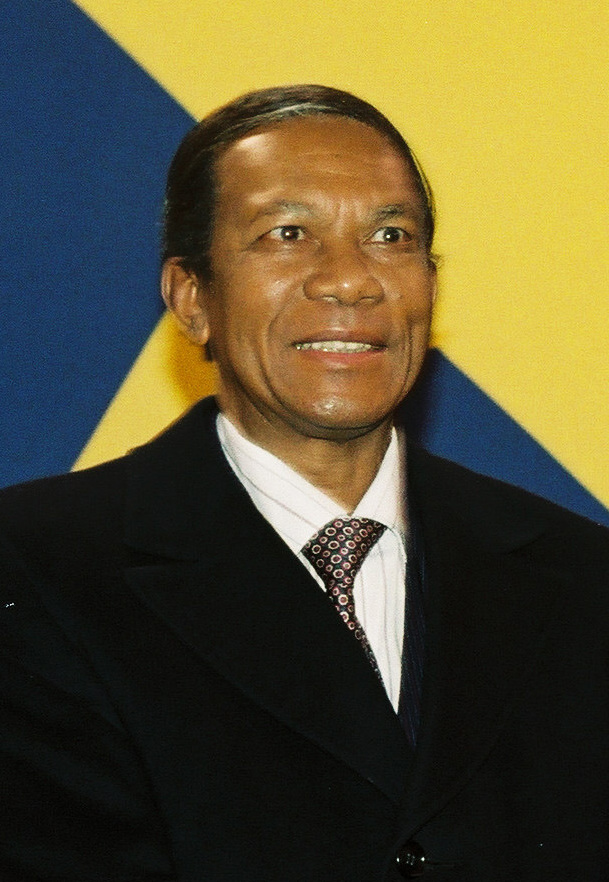

Nominee	Didier Ratsiraka	Manandafy Rakotonirina	Jérôme Marojama Razanabahiny
Party	AREMA	Proletarians	PMNU
Popular vote	2,891,333	891,161	688,345
Percentage	62.71%	19.33%	14.93%
President before election
Didier Ratsiraka
AREMA
Elected President
Didier Ratsiraka
AREMA

Presidential elections were held in Madagascar on 12 March 1989. Incumbent President Didier Ratsiraka of AREMA won with over 60% of the vote. Voter turnout was 81.04%.

== Results ==
Candidate	Party	Votes	%
Didier Ratsiraka	AREMA	2,891,333	62.71
Manandafy Rakotonirina	Movement for Proletarian Power	891,161	19.33
Jérôme Marojama Razanabahiny	Popular Movement for National Unity	688,345	14.93
Monja Jaona	Madagascar for the Malagasy	139,735	3.03
Total		4,610,574	100.00
Valid votes		4,610,574	97.69
Invalid/blank votes		108,994	2.31
Total votes		4,719,568	100.00
Registered voters/turnout		5,823,778	81.04
Source: EISA
