= 1975 Malagasy constitutional referendum =

21 December 1975
- Are you in favor of the 'Red Book', the new constitution and a seven-year term for Captain Didier Ratsiraka?

Results
Choice	Votes	%
Yes	3,213,146	95.57%
No	148,868	4.43%
Valid votes	3,362,014	99.05%
Invalid or blank votes	32,101	0.95%
Total votes	3,394,115	100.00%
Registered voters/turnout	3,698,541	91.77%

A constitutional referendum was held in Madagascar on 21 December 1975. The new constitution created a presidential republic, with the president serving seven-year terms and incumbent President Didier Ratsiraka was to serve the first term without being elected. It also created a High Revolutionary Council to create a "socialist revolution" and a military committee to oversee socio-economic development. Madagascar was transformed into the Democratic Republic of Madagascar. All political parties with the exception of those "loyal to the socialist revolution" were to be banned, and those that were allowed to exist would have to be affiliated with the National Front for the Defense of the Revolution, which was led by Ratsiraka's AREMA party.

The constitution was approved by 96% of voters with a 92% voter turnout.

== Results ==
Choice	Votes	%
For	3,213,146	95.57
Against	148,868	4.43
Total	3,362,014	100.00
Valid votes	3,362,014	99.05
Invalid/blank votes	32,101	0.95
Total votes	3,394,115	100.00
Registered voters/turnout	3,698,541	91.77
Source: EISA
