= Gilles Andriamahazo =

Malagasy politician, brief head of state of Madagascar in 1975

General Gilles Andriamahazo

Chairman of the National Military Leadership Committee
- In office 12 February 1975 – 15 June 1975
- Preceded by: Richard Ratsimandrava (as Head of State)
- Succeeded by: Didier Ratsiraka (as President of Madagascar)

Personal details
- Born: 5 May 1919 Fort Dauphin, Anosy, French Madagascar
- Died: 13 September 1989 (aged 70) Antananarivo, Democratic Republic of Madagascar
- Cause of death: Heart attack

General Gilles Andriamahazo (5 May 1919 – 13 September 1989) was a Malagasy general and political figure. He served as the head of state of Madagascar (Chairman of the National Military Leadership Committee) and minister of defense between 12 February and 15 June 1975.

== Early life and military career ==
Born in Fort Dauphin, Anosy Region on 13 May 1919, he followed a military career. During World War II Andriamahazo served in the French Army and participated in the French military campaign against Algerian nationalists in the 1950s. He retired as an army officer in 1976.

== Government ==
He was the successor of Richard Ratsimandrava after the latter's assassination. He served as head of state from 12 February to 15 June 1975, when he resigned in favour of Didier Ratsiraka. He is widely credited with having prevented an outbreak of civil war during the tension that followed Colonel Ratsimandrava's assassination. He died of a heart attack at the age of 70, on 14 September 1989.
