= Joël Rakotomalala =

Malagasy military officer and politician

His Excellency Colonel Joël Rakotomalala

9th Prime Minister of Madagascar
- In office 11 January 1976 – 30 July 1976
- President: Didier Ratsiraka
- Preceded by: Office Reestablished
- Succeeded by: Justin Rakotoniaina

Personal details
- Born: 29 March 1929 Toliara Province, French Madagascar
- Died: 30 July 1976 (aged 47) Antsirabe, Democratic Republic of Madagascar
- Cause of death: Helicopter accident
- Party: AREMA

Joël Rakotomalala (Toliara Province, 29 March 1929 – Antsirabe, 30 July 1976) was a Malagasy military officer and politician.

== Biography ==
Colonel of the Madagascar People's Armed Forces, he was Prime Minister and minister of defense of the Democratic Republic of Madagascar from 11 January 1976 to his death, under the presidency of Admiral Didier Ratsiraka. He was a member of the Association for the Rebirth of Madagascar. He died in the accident of an Aérospatiale Alouette III transport helicopter during a short flight with the chief of staff Alphonse Rakotonirainy on 30 July 1976, the last month of the presence of the French Armed Forces in Madagascar. He was replaced on 12 August as prime minister by Justin Rakotoniaina.

== The accident ==
The maximum seven-seat transport helicopter, with more than 40 kilograms of luggage, took off from Antananarivo on 30 July 1976 for several successive flights. It crashed at the third stage, around noon. In view of the inflamed political situation, the accident gave rise to suspicions of sabotage.

Political offices
Vacant Title last held by Gabriel Ramanantsoa	Prime Minister of Madagascar; 1976	Succeeded by Justin Rakotoniaina
