= 1998 Malagasy constitutional referendum =

25 March 1998

Results
Choice	Votes	%
Yes	1,524,581	50.96%
No	1,467,397	49.04%
Valid votes	2,991,978	93.42%
Invalid or blank votes	210,792	6.58%
Total votes	3,202,770	100.00%
Registered voters/turnout	4,557,362	70.28%

A constitutional referendum was held in Madagascar on 25 March 1998. The proposed amendments would allow the president to dissolve parliament, and divide the country into six provinces. It was narrowly approved by just 50.96% of voters, with a 70% turnout.

== Results ==
Choice	Votes	%
For	1,524,581	50.96
Against	1,467,397	49.04
Invalid/blank votes	210,792	–
Total	3,202 770	100
Registered voters/turnout	4,557,362	70.27
Source: EISA
