= Mamy Ranaivoniarivo =

Malagasy politician

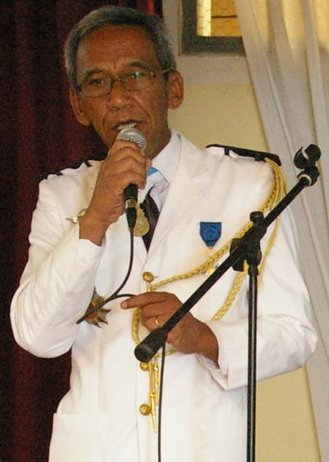

Minister of the Defence of Madagascar
- In office 9 February 2009 – 17 March 2009
- President: Marc Ravalomanana
- Preceded by: Cécile Manorohanta
- Succeeded by: Noêl Girardin Rakotonandrasana

Personal details
- Born: 6 December 1950 (age 75) Ambalavao, Haute Matsiatra, Madagascar

Vice-Admiral Mamy Ranaivoniarivo (born 6 December 1950) is a Malagasy politician who was briefly the minister of defense of Madagascar from March 2009 to April 2009. He was appointed to office on February 9, 2009, following Cécile Manorohanta's resignation, but resigned on March 10, 2009, after he was confronted by mutineer army officers who stated that they would no longer follow orders from current Malagasy president Marc Ravalomanana and instead switch allegiances to Andry Rajoelina, but this was later rescinded as Ranaivoniarivo explained that the "resignation" had been done under gunpoint.
