= 1993 Malagasy parliamentary election =

Parliamentary elections were held in Madagascar on 16 June 1993, the first following the approval of a new constitution in a referendum that reintroduced full multi-party democracy the previous year.

The Committee of Active Forces won the most seats, whilst parties aligned with President Albert Zafy won 75 seats in total. Voter turnout was 54.68%.

== Results ==
Party	Votes	%	Seats	+/–
Committee of Active Forces (Note: Parties affiliated with Albert Zafy)			46	New
Movement for Proletarian Power			15	+8
Economic Liberalism and Democratic Action for National Recovery			13	New
Association of United Malagasys			11	New
Fihaonana			8	New
Rally for Socialism and Democracy			8	New
Congress Party for the Independence of Madagascar – Renewal			5	+2
National Union for Development and Democracy – Rasalama Active Forces			5	New
Farimbona			2	New
National Union for Development and Democracy			2	New
Committee supporting the Development of Democracy in Madagascar			2	New
Christian Action of Regional Cadres and Businessmen for Development			2	New
Fivoarana			2	New
Rasalama Active Forces – Teachers and Educators			1	New
Action and Reflection Group for the Development of Madagascar			1	New
Vatomizana			1	New
Other parties			10	–
Total			134	–3
Total votes	3,454,847	–		
Registered voters/turnout	6,317,974	54.68		
Source: EISA
