= Cécile Manorohanta =

Malagasy Prime Minister

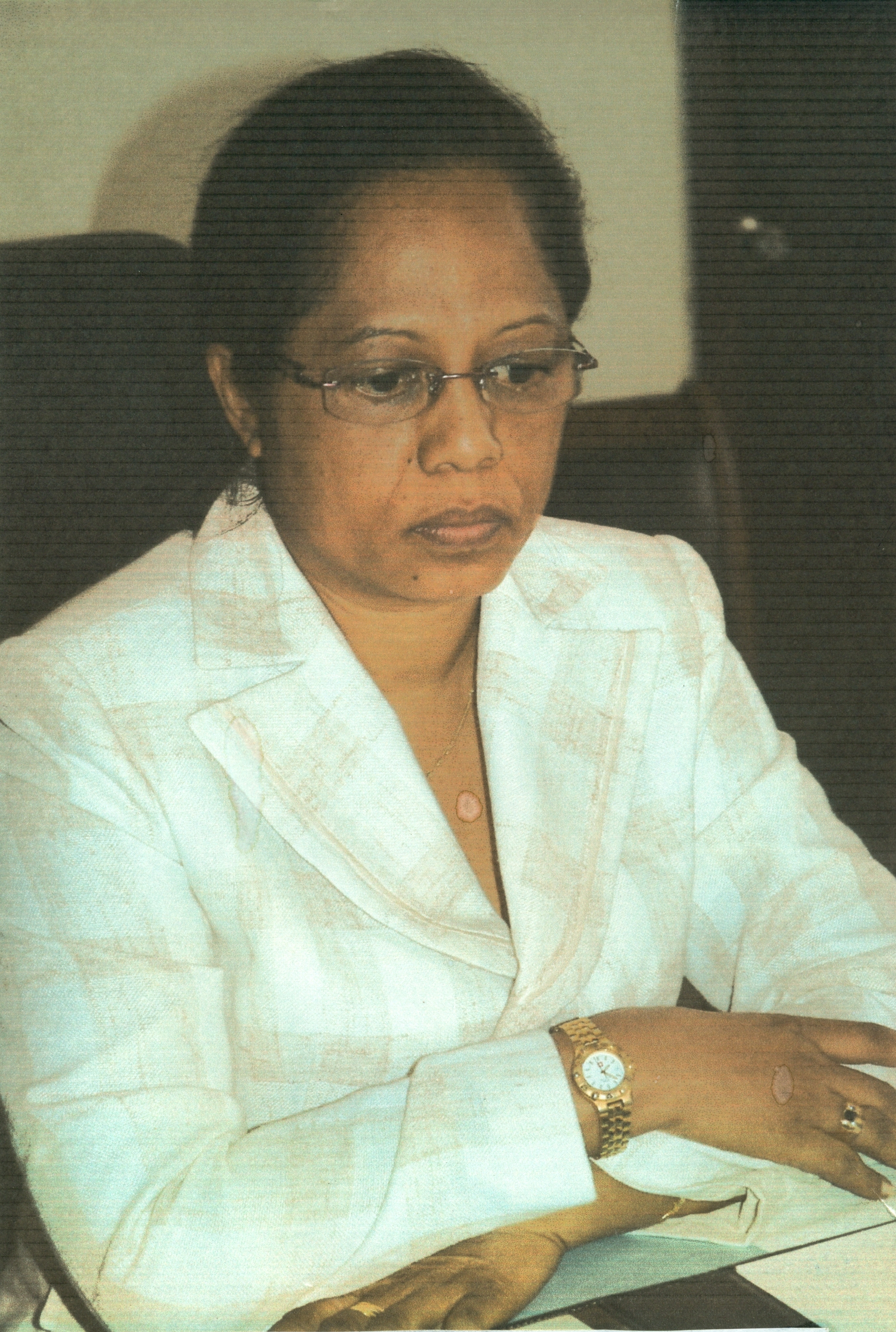

Acting Prime Minister of Madagascar
- In office 18 December 2009 – 20 December 2009
- President: Andry Rajoelina
- Preceded by: Eugène Mangalaza
- Succeeded by: Albert Camille Vital

Cécile Manorohanta (Cécile Marie Ange Manorohanta) is a Malagasy politician serving in the government of Madagascar as deputy prime minister for the interior since 2009. Previously she was Minister of Defense from 2007 to 2009. She is Madagascar’s first female prime minister.

Manorohanta was appointed as defense minister on 27 October 2007 in the government of Prime Minister Charles Rabemananjara. She was the first female defense minister in her country.

On 9 February 2009, Manorohanta announced her resignation, saying that "after all that has happened, I decide as of now to no longer remain part of this government," referring to the shooting on 7 February, during the 2009 Malagasy protests, in which police shot dead at least 50 protesters. Chief of military staff Mamy Ranaivoniarivo was appointed to replace Manorohanta on the same day.

Under Transitional President Andry Rajoelina, Manorohanta was reappointed to the government as Deputy Prime Minister for the Interior on 8 September 2009.

On 18 December 2009, Rajoelina dismissed Prime Minister Eugene Mangalaza, whose appointment had been endorsed by opposition factions as part of a power-sharing agreement, and stated he would appoint Manorohanta in his place. However, on 20 December 2009 Rajoelina instead appointed Albert Camille Vital as Prime Minister.

Since 2013 she is the president of the University of Antsiranana.

Political offices
Preceded by Eugène Mangalaza	Prime Minister of Madagascar; Acting; 2009	Succeeded by Albert Camille Vital
