= Monja Roindefo =

Malagasy politician

21st Prime Minister of Madagascar
- In office 17 March 2009 – 10 October 2009
- President: Andry Rajoelina
- Preceded by: Charles Rabemananjara
- Succeeded by: Eugène Mangalaza

Personal details
- Born: 1965 (age 60–61) Toliara, Madagascar
- Party: Madagascar for the Malagasy (Monima)

Monja Roindefo Zafitsimivalo (born 1965) is a Malagasy politician who was Prime Minister of Madagascar from March 2009 to October 2009. He was appointed on 7 February 2009 by opposition leader Andry Rajoelina at the head of Rajoelina's rival government; later, on 17 March, Andry Rajoelina was installed in power by the military, and Monja Roindefo officially took over as prime minister.

== Life and career ==
Roindefo, the son of politician Monja Jaona, was born in Toliara, Atsimo-Andrefana.

Roindefo attempted to stand as a candidate in the December 2006 presidential election. Ballot papers for Roindefo, along with some other minor candidates, were not available at polling stations. They had not met the 29 October 2006 deadline for submitting the papers and, although they tried to submit them afterward, the government refused to accept them and said that anyone who attempted to distribute ballot papers to polling stations on the day of the election would be arrested.

=== 2009 Madagascar political crisis ===
Following the August 2009 power-sharing agreement signed in Maputo, Andry Rajoelina reappointed Monja Roindefo as prime minister on 5 September 2009, despite opposition objections. Although Roindefo's new, 31-member government, which was appointed on 8 September, was officially intended to be an inclusive national unity government, the opposition denounced Andry Rajoelina's "unilateral" decisions. The Southern African Development Community (SADC) said that it "firmly rejects and condemns" Rajoelina's reappointment of Monja Roindefo and the appointment of a new government without opposition approval.

On 6 October 2009, the various political factions reached an agreement on who should hold the highest offices of state. According to the agreement, Andry Rajoelina would remain president during the transitional period, but the opposition factions (led by former presidents Marc Ravalomanana, Didier Ratsiraka, and Albert Zafy) insisted that Monja Roindefo be replaced as prime minister. All of the factions, including Andry Rajoelina's, agreed on the choice of Eugene Mangalaza as prime minister.

Andry Rajoelina affirmed on 9 October that he would appoint Eugene Mangalaza to replace Monja Roindefo. Nevertheless, Roindefo said on 10 October that he would not resign, insisting that he led a legal government and that it was "still fulfilling its mission". He stressed that the faction leaders had not signed the agreement and said that his government could not be removed by international mediators; he also said that he would stand as a presidential candidate "if the rules of the game are clearly defined". The other members of the government met later on 10 October and expressed disagreement with Monja Roindefo's determination to remain in office. Andry Rajoelina then appointed Eugene Mangalaza as prime minister late on 10 October.

Monja Roindefo took the matter to the Council of State on 12 October 2009, requesting that it annul the decree appointing Eugene Mangalaza; he argued that the procedure was flawed and that the faction leaders needed to sign the agreement in order for it to become valid. The Council of State accordingly suspended the decree on 15 October, but lifted the suspension and refused to annul the appointment in its final ruling on 22 October 2009.

== 2006 Malagasy presidential election ==
He was candidate for the 2006 presidential elections but failed with 0.00% of votes (21 votes).

== 2023 Malagasy presidential election ==
He runs for the 2023 Malagasy presidential elections.

Political offices
Preceded by Charles Rabemananjara	Prime Minister of Madagascar; 2009	Succeeded by Eugène Mangalaza
