= Emblem of Madagascar =

National seal of the Republic of Madagascar

- Armiger: Republic of Madagascar
- Adopted: 1998
- Motto: Tanindrazana, Firaisankina, Fanorenana "Homeland, Solidarity, Renew" "Patrie, Solidarité, Rénovation"

The grand emblem of Madagascar (French: emblème de Madagascar; Malagasy: Fanevan'i Madagasikara) includes an outline map of the island at the center (together with two smaller islands nearby: the Glorioso Islands and Tromelin Island), and below it the head of a zebu. Colors used are red, green, yellow, black, and white. Green and red rays emanate from the map, making it look like the sun and also the Ravenala, a plant typical of Madagascar.

The emblem is surrounded by Madagascar's official language, Malagasy. The upper part of the emblem, is written in the official name of the country: REPOBLIKAN'I MADAGASIKARA ("Republic of Madagascar" in English or "République de Madagascar" in French) and at the base bears the national motto: TANINDRAZANA - FIRAISANKINA – FANORENANA (Homeland - Solidarity - Renew in English or "Patrie - Solidarité - Renouveau" in French). Various versions of the Constitution Article 4 have used other mottos.

== Gallery ==
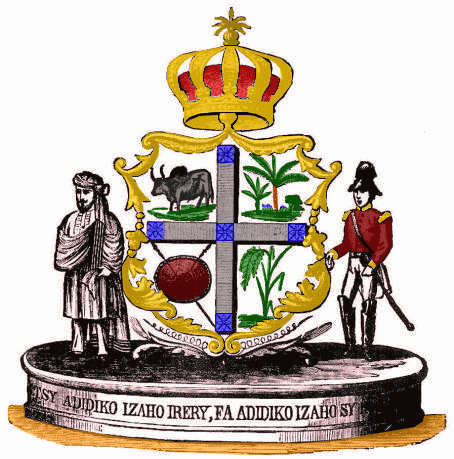
Coat of arms of Queen Ranavalona II

Coat of arms of the Merina Kingdom in 1896

Seal of the Government-General of Madagascar (1897 - 1958)

Emblem of the Malagasy Republic

Seal of the Malagasy Republic

Emblem of the Democratic Republic of Madagascar

Seal of the Republic of Madagascar between 1993 and 1998
