= 1982 Malagasy presidential election =

← 1972	7 November 1982	1989 →
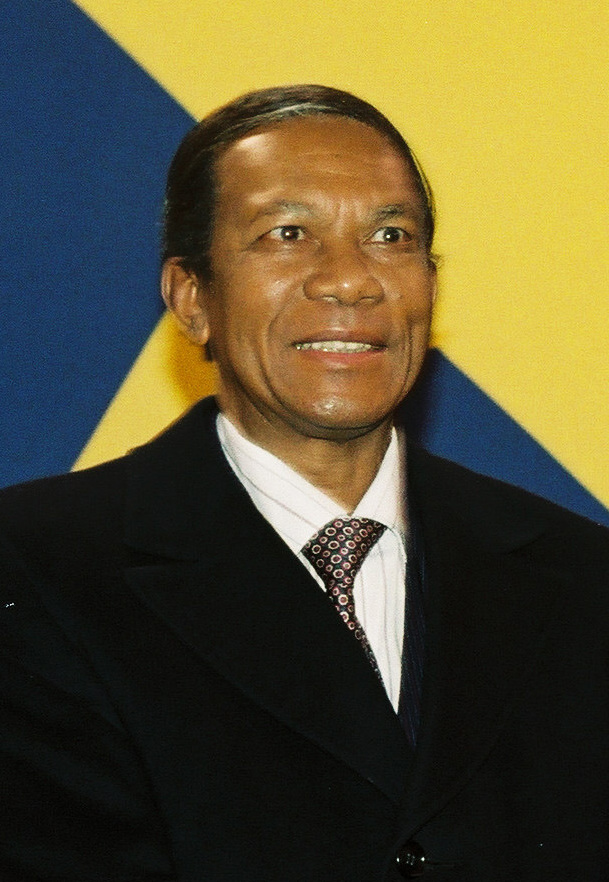

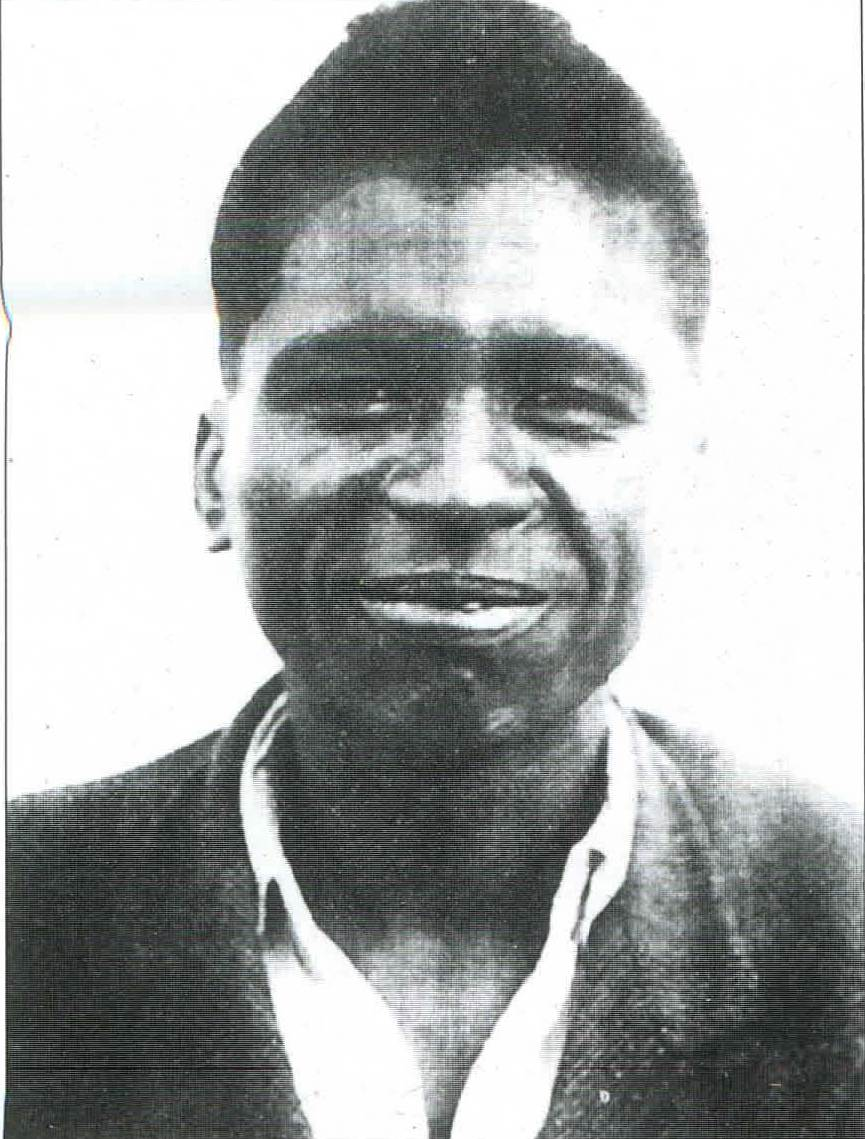
Nominee	Didier Ratsiraka	Monja Jaona
Party	AREMA	MONIMA
Popular vote	3,192,156	789,869
Percentage	80.16%	19.84%
President before election
Didier Ratsiraka
AREMA
Elected President
Didier Ratsiraka
AREMA

Presidential elections were held in Madagascar on 7 November 1982. Incumbent President Didier Ratsiraka of AREMA won with over 80% of the vote. Voter turnout was 86.75%.

== Results ==
Candidate	Party	Votes	%
Didier Ratsiraka	AREMA	3,192,156	80.16
Monja Jaona	Madagascar for the Malagasy	789,869	19.84
Total		3,982,025	100.00
Valid votes		3,982,025	96.66
Invalid/blank votes		137,571	3.34
Total votes		4,119,596	100.00
Registered voters/turnout		4,749,054	86.75
Source: EISA
