= Justin Rakotoniaina =

Prime Minister of Madagascar

10th Prime Minister of Madagascar
- In office 12 August 1976 – 1 August 1977
- President: Didier Ratsiraka
- Preceded by: Joël Rakotomalala
- Succeeded by: Désiré Rakotoarijaona

Personal details
- Born: 14 December 1933
- Died: November 2001 (aged 67)
- Party: AREMA

Justin Rakotoniaina (14 December 1933 – November 2001) was a diplomat who briefly served as Prime Minister of Madagascar in 1976–1977 after Joël Rakotomalala was killed in a helicopter accident. He was a member of the Association for the Rebirth of Madagascar.

Political offices
Preceded by Joël Rakotomalala	Prime Minister of Madagascar; 1976–1977	Succeeded by Désiré Rakotoarijaona
