= Charles Rabemananjara =

Malagasy politician

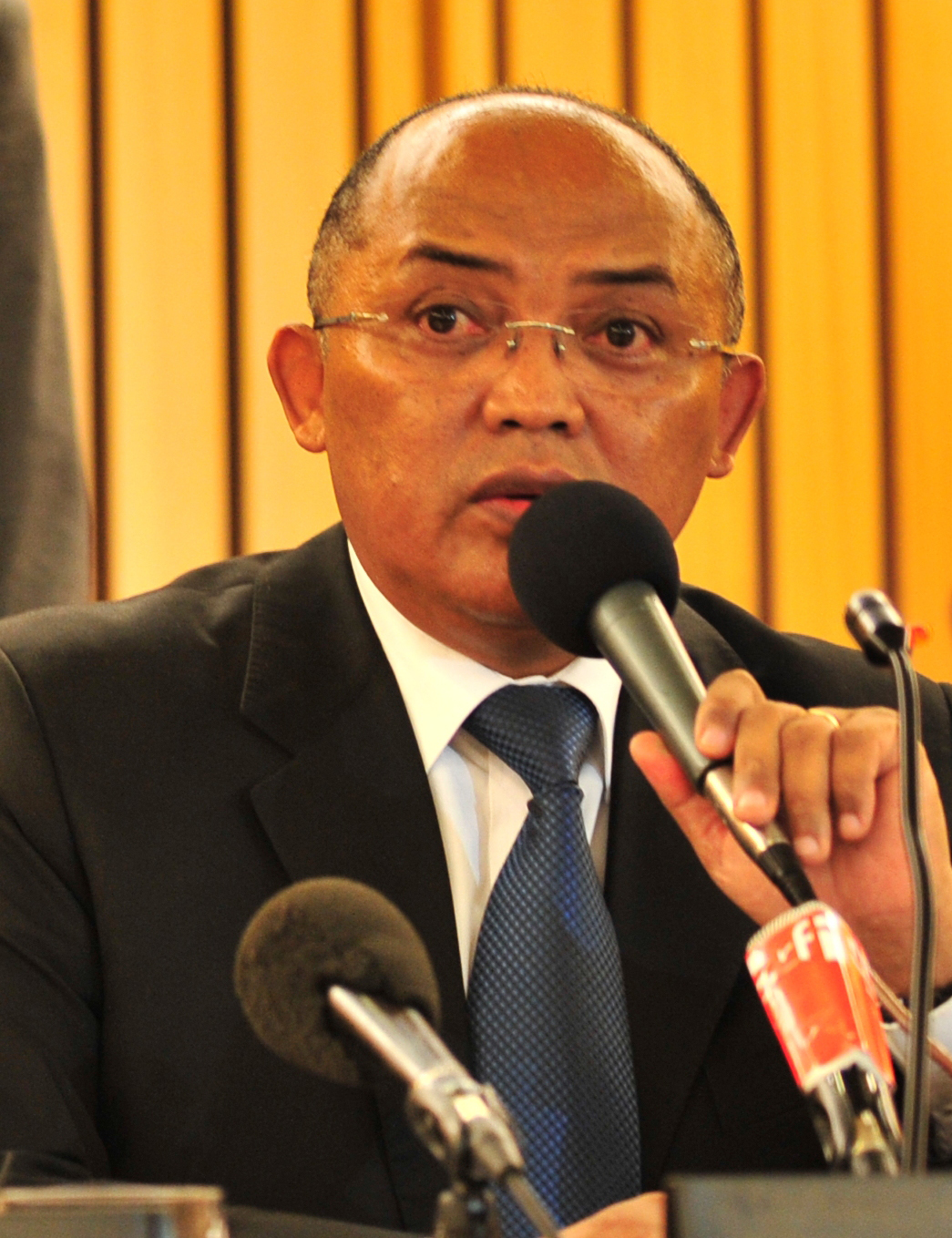

20th Prime Minister of Madagascar
- In office 20 January 2007 – 17 March 2009
- President: Marc Ravalomanana
- Preceded by: Jacques Sylla
- Succeeded by: Monja Roindefo

Personal details
- Born: 9 June 1947 (age 79) Antananarivo, French Madagascar
- Party: Tiako I Madagasikara

Charles Rabemananjara (born 9 June 1947) was Prime Minister of Madagascar from 2007 to 2009. He took office on 20 January 2007 at the beginning of the second term of President Marc Ravalomanana.

== Life and career ==
Rabemananjara was born in Antananarivo in 1947. During Marc Ravalomanana's first term as president, Rabemananjara became Director of the Military Cabinet of the Presidency in 2004 and was then named Minister of the Interior and Administrative Reform on November 28, 2005. After becoming prime minister, Rabemananjara remained Interior Minister in the new government, named on January 25, 2007.

Following the September 2007 parliamentary election, Ravalomanana appointed a new government, in which Rabemananjara remained in his posts as Prime Minister and Interior Minister, on October 27, 2007. He was additionally assigned the Decentralization portfolio in the 19-member government appointed on April 30, 2008. As prime minister, he was an ex officio member of the national political bureau of the ruling Tiako i Madagasikara (TIM) political party and therefore remained on the political bureau at TIM's May 2008 congress.

Rabemananjara is a Merina, like Ravalomanana. He was also a general in the army of Madagascar.

Political offices
Preceded by Jacques Sylla	Prime Minister of Madagascar; 2007-2009	Succeeded by Monja Roindefo
