= Tovonanahary Rabetsitonta =

Malagasy politician (born 1949)

Tovonanahary Rabetsitonta (born April 3, 1949, in Ambovombe) is a Malagasy politician. He is a member of the Senate of Madagascar for Analamanga, and is a member of the Groupe de Réflexion et d'Action pour le Développement de Madagascar party.
