= Gabriel Ramanantsoa =

Malagasy politician, second President of Madagascar from 1972 to 1975

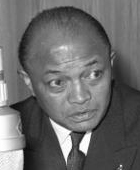
- Ramanantsoa in 1961

2nd President of Madagascar
- In office 11 October 1972 – 5 February 1975
- Prime Minister: Himself
- Preceded by: Philibert Tsiranana
- Succeeded by: Richard Ratsimandrava (as Head of State)

8th Prime Minister of Madagascar
- In office 18 May 1972 – 5 February 1975
- President: Philibert Tsiranana; Himself
- Preceded by: Office reestablished Philibert Tsiranana (1958–1959)
- Succeeded by: Office abolished from 1975 to 1976; Joël Rakotomalala

Personal details
- Born: 13 April 1906 Antananarivo, French Madagascar
- Died: 9 May 1979 (aged 73) Paris, France
- Spouse: Marcelle Larguier (m. 1934)

Gabriel Ramanantsoa (13 April 1906 – 9 May 1979) was a Malagasy politician who served as the second president and eighth prime minister of Madagascar from 1972 to 1975. He presided over an era of military rule in Madagascar, restructuring the government and reducing the presence of France, the country's former colonial overlord. Continued unrest and ongoing economic difficulties undermined his political support, and he turned over control of the country to Richard Ratsimandrava in 1975.

== Early years ==
Ramanantsoa was a member of the Merina ethnic group, and came from a wealthy family. He graduated from Saint-Cyr in 1931. He was a career officer in the French army and was a colonel when Madagascar became independent in 1960. He joined the Malagasy military, and became the first general in the history of independent Madagascar.

== Head of State ==
In May 1972, amidst massive political protests known as rotaka, he became prime minister and minister of defense of the country. In an attempt to stabilize the First Republic, President Philibert Tsiranana vested Ramanantsoa with full executive powers. Despite French troops still being stationed in Madagascar and Tsiranana's pro-French policies, the French made no effort to support Tsiranana or intervene to stabilize the government.

In October 1972, voters approved a referendum that suspended the existing governmental structure in favor of a five-year transition period under military leadership, with Ramanantsoa at the head. The position of president was eliminated, leaving Tsiranana without any governmental power, and Ramanantsoa as the uncontested head of state.

Ramanantsoa tried to start post-rotaka political reconciliation by appointing a cabinet with members across the Malagasy political spectrum. Among these cabinet members were Richard Ratsimandrava as Minister of the Interior and Didier Ratsiraka as Minister of Foreign Affairs. These two men would be Ramanantsoa's successors as president of Madagascar, with Ratsimandrava directly succeeding Ramanantsoa, and Ratsiraka ascending to the presidency after Ratsimandrava's assassination.

One of Ramanantsoa's major governmental goals was to reduce France's post-colonial power over Madagascar and to assert a Malagsy identity for the island, a process known as Malgachization. He withdrew Madagascar from the Franc Zone and removed French military presence from the island. His administration nationalized some of the remaining French companies and opened state-run corporations. Education in the Malagasy language was also introduced, but this increased ethnic tensions and fears that the Malagasy identity would be a specifically Merina identity.

His popularity faded due to continued unrest and rumors of corruption involving him and his wife, and the government was nearly overthrown in December 1974 by a coup led by Bréchard Rajaonarison, a colonel. After the coup, Ramanantsoa dismissed the government and attempted to form a new one. In the process, he lost the backing of Richard Ratsimandrava and Didier Ratsiraka, and on 5 February 1975, he resigned and named Ratsimandrava as his successor. He continued to exert some informal political power under Ratsimandrava and the early days of Ratsiraka's presidency, but by the end of 1975, Ramanantsoa had retired from all military and governmental roles.

== Post-government ==
Four years later, he died in Paris, France on 9 May 1979. His nephew, Bernard Ramanantsoa, served as dean of the French business school HEC Paris from 1996 to 2015.
