= Ambodivoanio =

- Location in Madagascar
- Coordinates: 16°11′S 49°40′E
- Country: Madagascar
- Region: Ambatosoa
- District: Mananara Nord
- Elevation: 82 m (269 ft)

Population (2001)
  - Total: 9,000
- Time zone: UTC+3 (EAT)

Ambodivoanio is a town and commune (Malagasy: kaominina) in Ambatosoa, Madagascar. It belongs to the district of Mananara Nord. The population of the commune was estimated to be approximately 9,000 in 2001 commune census.

Primary and junior level secondary education are available in town. The majority 97% of the population of the commune are farmers. The most important crops are rice and cloves, while other important agricultural products are coffee and vanilla. Services provide employment for 3% of the population.
