= Supreme Revolutionary Council (Madagascar) =

The Supreme Revolutionary Council was the body that ruled Madagascar from 1975 to 1991. Didier Ratsiraka became the President of the Supreme Revolutionary Council on 15 June 1975, and was later sworn in as President of Madagascar on 4 January 1976

== Members (March 1985) ==
- Didier Ratsiraka
- Col. Désiré Rakotoarijaona
- Richard Andriamanjato
- Dr. Jérôme Marojama Razanabahiny
- Solo Norbert Andriamorasata
- Justin Rakotoniaina
- Manandafy Rakotonirina
- Col. Jean Ferlin Fiakara
- Lt-Col. Ferdinand Jaotombo
- Lt-Col. Max Valérien Marson
- Étienne Mora
- Jean-Baptiste Ramanantsalama
- Lt-Col. Jean de Dieu Randriantanany
- Arsène Ratsifehera
- M. Rakotovao-Razakaboana
- Celestin Radio
- Simon Pierre
- George Thomas Indrianjafy
- Maharanga Tsihozony
- Michel Mahatsanga
- Théophile Andrianoelisoa
- André Sosohany
- Victor Henri Boanoro
