= 1972 Malagasy military rule referendum =

- 8 October 1972
- Do you accept the attached draft law, which will allow Major General Gabriel Ramanantsoa and his government of national unity to carry out for five years the structural transformations essential to renewal, and to install in public life a climate in keeping with the wishes of the people?

Results
Choice	Votes	%
Yes	2,784,687	96.43%
No	103,215	3.57%
Valid votes	2,887,902	99.36%
Invalid or blank votes	18,567	0.64%
Total votes	2,906,469	100.00%
Registered voters/turnout	3,448,203	84.29%

A referendum on military rule was held in Madagascar on 8 October 1972. It followed General Gabriel Ramanantsoa taking power from elected President Philibert Tsiranana in May, and Ramanantsoa's proposals for a five-year transition period during which the National Assembly would be suspended. The plans were approved by 96% of voters with an 84% voter turnout.

== Results ==
Choice	Votes	%
For	2,784,687	96.43
Against	103,215	3.57
Total	2,887,902	100.00
Valid votes	2,887,902	99.36
Invalid/blank votes	18,567	0.64
Total votes	2,906,469	100.00
Registered voters/turnout	3,448,203	84.29
Source: EISA
