= Richard Ratsimandrava =

Malagasy politician, brief head of state of Madagascar in 1975

Colonel Richard Ratsimandrava
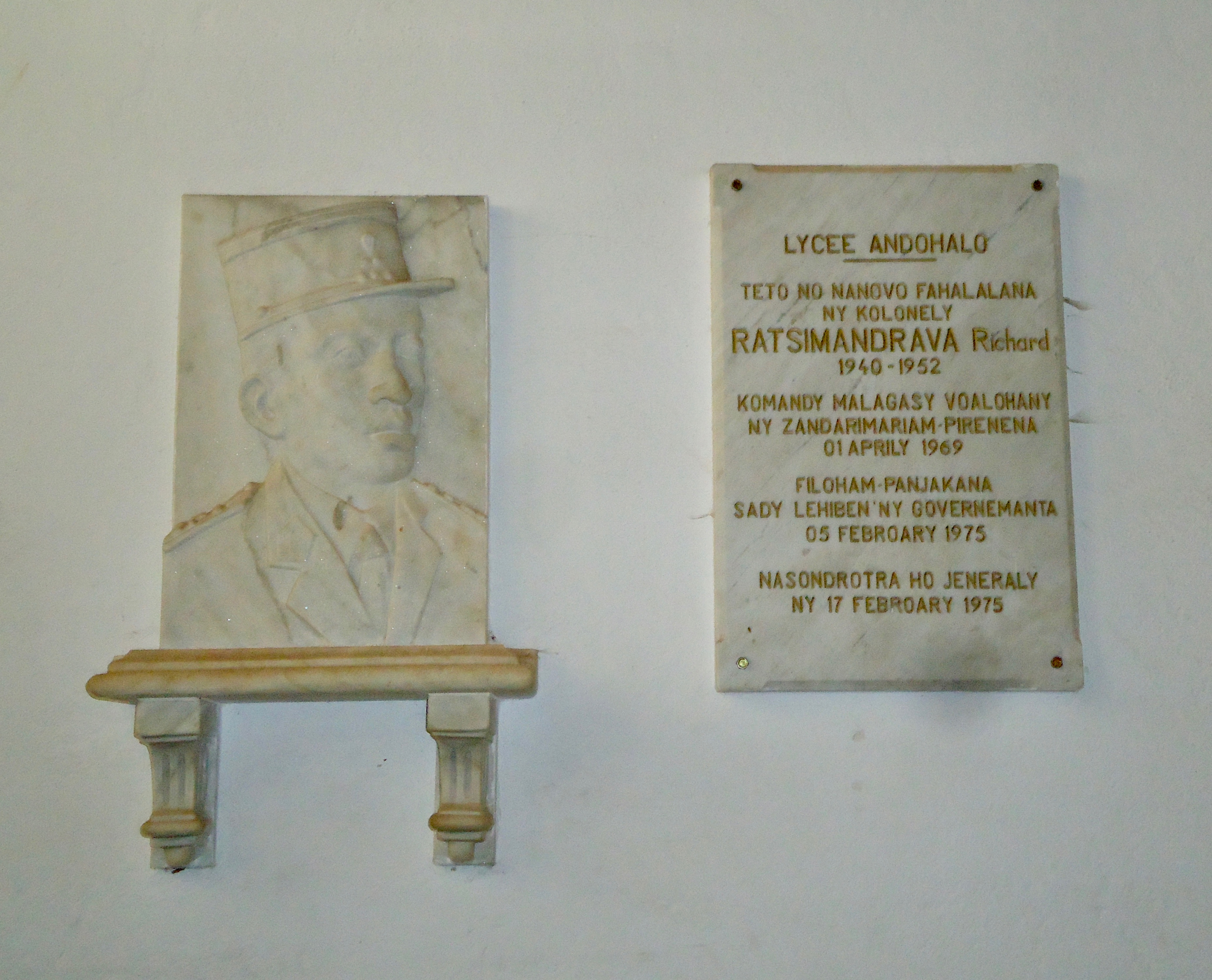
- Bust of Ratsimandrava

Head of State of Madagascar
- In office 5 – 11 February 1975
- Preceded by: Gabriel Ramanantsoa (as President of Madagascar)
- Succeeded by: Gilles Andriamahazo (as Chairman of the National Military Leadership Committee)

Personal details
- Born: 21 March 1931 Antananarivo, French Madagascar
- Died: 11 February 1975 (aged 43) Antananarivo, Democratic Republic of Madagascar
- Cause of death: Assassination

Colonel Richard Ratsimandrava (21 March 1931 – 11 February 1975) was a Malagasy politician and soldier who served as the head of state of Madagascar for six days in February 1975 before his assassination in office.

== Biography ==
He was born in 1931 and was a Merina from a Merina family. A graduate of the French Saint Cyr military college, Ratsimandrava served throughout French Africa before returning to Madagascar when that country gained independence in 1960. He joined the army, attaining the rank of lieutenant-colonel by 1968. In 1972 President Gabriel Ramanantsoa established a military government to replace the independence government of Philibert Tsiranana, and Ratsimandrava was appointed Minister of the Interior. Several senior officers were able to manipulate the army, which led to the ousting of Ramanantsoa on 5 February 1975.

== Death ==
Six days following his taking office, Ratsimandrava was gunned down at 8 p.m. while driving from the presidential palace to his home. His death was announced by the new ruling military committee. It claimed that the President had been killed by members of the Republican Security Forces (Groupe Mobile de Police-GMP), a counterinsurgency outfit dissolved by his predecessor. The event nearly plunged the country into civil war between supporters of the military government and former President Tsiranana. In 2006, on the 31st anniversary of colonel's murder, a conference was held in Madagascar.
