= Democratic Republic of Madagascar =

Socialist state on the island of Madagascar from 1975 to 1992

Coordinates: 18°56′S 47°31′E

Democratic Republic of Madagascar: Repoblika Demokratika Malagasy (Malagasy); République démocratique de Madagascar (French)
- 1975–1992
- Flag Emblem
- Motto: Fitiavana, Tanindrazana, Fandrosoana (Malagasy); Amour, Patrie, Progrès (French); "Love, Fatherland, Progress"
- Anthem: Ry Tanindrazanay malala ô! (Malagasy); Ô Terre de nos ancêtres bien-aimés! (French) "Oh, land of our beloved ancestors!"
- Location of the Democratic Republic of Madagascar in Africa
- Capital: Antananarivo
- Common languages: Malagasy; French
- Government: Socialist state
- President
  - 1975–1992: Didier Ratsiraka
- Prime Minister
  - 1976: Joel Rakotomalala
  - 1991–1992: Guy Razanamasy
- Legislature: Popular National Assembly
- Historical era: Cold War
  - Established: 30 December 1975
  - Constitution adopted: 12 January 1992

Area
- 1975: 587,040 km^{2} (226,660 sq mi)
- 1992: 587,040 km^{2} (226,660 sq mi)

Population
  - 1975: 7,568,577
  - 1992: 12,596,263
- Currency: Malagasy franc (MGF)
- Calling code: 261
- ISO 3166 code: MG
Preceded by	Succeeded by
Malagasy Republic	Third Republic of Madagascar
- Today part of: Madagascar

The Democratic Republic of Madagascar (Malagasy: Repoblika Demokratika Malagasy, French: République démocratique de Madagascar) was the Malagasy socialist state that existed from 1975 to 1992.

== History ==
=== Establishment (1975) ===
Didier Ratsiraka was elected to a seven-year term as president in a national referendum on 21 December 1975, confirming the mandate for consensus and inaugurating Madagascar's Second Republic. The guiding principle of Ratsiraka's administration was the need for a socialist "revolution from above." Specifically, he sought to radically change Malagasy society in accordance with programs and principles incorporated into the Charter of the Malagasy Socialist Revolution, popularly referred to as the "Red Book" (Boky Mena). According to this document, the primary goal of the newly renamed Democratic Republic of Madagascar was to build a "new society" founded on socialist principles and guided by the actions of the "five pillars of the revolution": the Supreme Revolutionary Council (SRC), peasants and workers, young intellectuals, women and the Popular Armed Forces. "The socialist revolution," explains the Red Book, "is the only choice possible for us in order to achieve rapid economic and cultural development in an autonomous, humane, and harmonious manner." The Red Book advocated a new foreign policy based on the principle of nonalignment, and domestic policies focused on renovating the fokonolona (community members), decentralising the administration and fomenting economic development through planning and popular input.

=== Early years (1975–1982) ===
Several early policies collectively decided by Ratsiraka and other members of the SRC set the tone of the revolution from above. The first major SRC decision was to bring the French-held sectors of the economy under government control. This economic decolonization was welcomed by nationalists, who had long fought for economic and cultural independence from France. The government also lifted martial law but retained press censorship. Finally, the SRC ordered the closure of an earth satellite tracking station operated by the United States as part of its commitment to nonaligned foreign relations.

Political consolidation proceeded apace following the addition of ten civilians to the SRC in January 1976. This act constituted the beginning of a civil-military partnership in that the SRC became more representative of the country's major political tendencies and ethnic communities. In March, the Vanguard of the Malagasy Revolution (Antokin'ny Revolisiona Malagasy – AREMA) was founded as the government party, and Ratsiraka became its secretary general. Unlike the ruling parties of several other socialist states, AREMA served as simply one (albeit the most powerful) member of a multi-party coalition of 7 parties united under the umbrella of the National Front for the Defense of the Revolution (Front National pour la Défense de la Révolution – FNDR), however membership in the FNDR was necessary for participation in the electoral process. Membership in the FDNR was preconditioned on party endorsement of the revolutionary principles and programs contained in the Red Book.

Ratsiraka and AREMA had the most influence. In the fokonolona elections held in March 1977, Arema won 90 percent of the 73,000 contested seats in 11,400 assemblies. In June 1977, Arema won 220 out of a total of 232 seats in elections for six provincial general assemblies, and 112 out of a total of 137 seats in the Popular National Assembly. Ratsiraka's 1977 cabinet contained Arema members in 16 of 18 ministerial posts.

In 1978, the government was confronted with growing popular disenchantment. As early as September 1977, anti-government protests erupted in Antananarivo due to severe shortages in foodstuffs and essential commodities. This trend intensified as the economy worsened. The government responded, sending in the armed forces to maintain order during student riots in May 1978. In the economic realm, the government accepted the free-market reforms being demanded by the International Monetary Fund (IMF) in order to allow an infusion of foreign aid. These economic reforms led Ratsiraka's supporters to accuse him of abandoning "scientific socialism" and alienating his traditional base of political support.

=== Development and realignment (1982–1989) ===
In the 1980s, Madagascar moved back towards France, abandoning many of its socialist policies in favour of a market economy, though Ratsiraka still retained power.

=== Decline and dissolution (1989–1992) ===
Widespread initial enthusiasm for Ratsiraka's socialist revolution from above had secured him nearly 96 percent of the popular vote in the 1975 constitutional referendum, but the vote had decreased to 80 percent in 1982 and 63 percent in 1989. 1989 marked a turning point due to the fall of the Berlin Wall and the end of one-party rule in Eastern Europe and the Soviet Union, similarly transforming electoral politics in Africa. In the case of Madagascar, opposition forces became increasingly vocal and denounced what they considered massive fraud in the 1989 presidential election, including Ratsiraka's refusal to update outdated voting lists that excluded the anti-Ratsiraka youth vote and alleged stuffing of ballot boxes at unmonitored rural polling stations. Large protests against Ratsiraka's inauguration led to violent clashes in Antananarivo that, according to official figures, left seventy-five dead and wounded.

Discontent with the Ratsiraka government heightened on 10 August 1991, when more than 400,000 citizens engaged in a march on the President's Palace with the intention of overthrowing the Ratsiraka government and installing a new multi-party political system. The country already faced an economy crippled by a general strike that had begun in May, as well as a divided and restless military whose loyalty no longer could be assumed. When the Presidential Guard allegedly opened fire on protesters and killed and wounded hundreds, a crisis of leadership occurred.

The result of these events was Ratsiraka's agreement on 31 October 1991 to support a process of democratic transition, complete with the formulation of a new constitution and the holding of free and fair multiparty elections. Albert Zafy, the central leader of the opposition forces and a côtier of the Tsimihety ethnic group, played a critical role in this transition process and ultimately emerged as the first president of Madagascar's Third Republic. The leader of the Comité des Forces Vives (Vital Forces Committee, known as Forces Vives), an umbrella opposition group composed of sixteen political parties that lead the 1991 protests, Zafy also emerged as the head of what became known as the High State Authority, a transitional government that shared power with the Ratsiraka government during the democratisation process.

== See also ==
- Madagascar
- History of Madagascar
