= Movement for the Progress of Madagascar =

Political party in Madagascar

Movement for the Progress of Madagascar Mpitolona ho an'ny Fandrosoan'i Madagasikara
- Leader: Manandafy Rakotonirina
- Founders: Manandafy Rakotonirina; Rakotonirainy Germain
- Founded: 27 December 1972
- Headquarters: Antananarivo
- Ideology: Liberalism; Historical: Socialism; Self management
- Political position: Centre; Historical: Far-left
- Regional affiliation: Africa Liberal Network
- International affiliation: Liberal International

Website
- http://nah296.free.fr/

The Movement for the Progress of Madagascar (Malagasy: Mpitolona ho an'ny Fandrosoan'i Madagasikara, MFM) is a political party in Madagascar.

The Chairman of the party is Manandafy Rakotonirina.

The party was founded on 27 December 1972 as the Party for Proletarian Power (Mpitolona ho amin'ny Fanjakana ny Madinika). At the time it was a left-wing opposition to the military regime that had taken power the same year. It remained in opposition during the Ratsiraka regime and was part of the movement that forced him to give up his power in 1991. It also backed Marc Ravalomanana against Ratsiraka in the December 2001 presidential election and helped in persuading him to not accept the first official result but proclaim himself as the winner.

The party has converted to liberalism and changed its name. It is now an observer member of the Liberal International, which it joined at the latter's Marrakesh Congress in 2006. Since the 23 September 2007 National Assembly elections, it is no longer represented in parliament.
