= Madagascar for the Malagasy =

Political party in Madagascar

Madagascar for the Malagasy Mouvement Nationaliste et Indépendant de Madagascar
- Abbreviation: MONIMA
- President: Monja Roindefo
- General Secretary: Gabriel Rabearimanana
- Founder: Monja Jaona
- Founded: July 1958
- Ideology: Malagasy nationalism Former; Maoism; National independence

Madagascar for the Malagasy (Malagasy: Madagasikara otronin'ny Malagasy; French: Mouvement Nationaliste et Indépendant de Madagascar, MONIMA) is a political party in Madagascar.

The National President of the party is Monja Roindefo. It was previously led by its founder, Monja Jaona, during which time its Secretary General was Gabriel Rabearimanana.

The party is one of the oldest political parties in the country, founded by Monja Jaona, mayor of the city of Toliara, in the 1950s. It played a significant role in the unrest that led to president Tsiranana's downfall in 1972.

In the 2007 elections, the party formed an alliance with Tambatra and Manaovasoa, known as TMM, in opposition to the ruling TIM party. Since the 23 September 2007 National Assembly elections it has no longer been represented in parliament.
