= Malagasy Revolutionary Party =

Political party in Madagascar

Malagasy Revolutionary Party Antoko Revolisionera Malagasy
- Abbreviation: AREMA
- National Secretary: Annick Zoary Ratsiraka
- Founder: Didier Ratsiraka
- Founded: 19 March 1976 (50 years, 55 days)
- Headquarters: Antananarivo
- Membership (1995): 455,000
- Ideology: Social democracy; 1976–1992: Communism; Marxism-Leninism
- Political position: Centre-left; 1976–1992: Far-left
- National Assembly: 0 / 151

Website
- www.parti-arema.com

The Malagasy Revolutionary Party, better known by its Malagasy acronym AREMA (from Antoko Revolisionera Malagasy), is a political party in Madagascar. It was the ruling party of the Democratic Republic of Madagascar, a one-party socialist state, from 1976 to 1992, when it was known as the Vanguard of the Malagasy Revolution (French: Avant-garde de la Révolution Malgache; Malagasy: Antokin'ny Revolisiona Malagasy, lit. 'Guarantor of the Malagasy Revolution'). The party has gone through three name changes since, although it has never changed its acronym AREMA.

== Name ==
"AREMA" was originally an acronym derived from the party's Malagasy and French names: Antokin'ny Revolisiona Malagasy (lit. 'Guarantor of the Malagasy Revolution') in Malagasy and Avant-garde de la Révolution Malgache (lit. 'Vanguard of the Malagasy Revolution') in French.

Sometime around 2001, the party changed its Malagasy name to Andry sy rihana enti-manavotra an'i Madagasikara (lit. 'Pillars and Foundations to Save Madagascar') and its French name to Avant-garde pour la rénovation de Madagascar (lit. 'Vanguard for the Renovation of Madagascar'). Although the acronym "AREMA" was maintained in both Malagasy and French, the meaning of the party's name differed between the two languages. The party later changed its French name to Association pour la renaissance de Madagascar, the acronym "AREMA" now also applying to the party's English name, Association for the Rebirth of Madagascar.

In 2020 the party adopted the Malagasy name Antoko Revolisionera Malagasy (lit. 'Malagasy Revolutionary Party') for all its official publications, including those in French.

== History ==
The party was founded on 19 March 1976 as the Vanguard of the Malagasy Revolution, the main political alliance of president Didier Ratsiraka. It held the majority of seats in the parliament until the fall of the Ratsiraka regime in 1991.

AREMA had 455,000 registered members in 1995.

In the elections to the Senate held on 18 March 2001, AREMA won 49 of the 60 elected seats.

In the parliamentary election held on 15 December 2002, AREMA won 4.9% of the popular vote and 3 out of 160 seats in the National Assembly, all three in Toamasina Province.

Pierrot Rajaonarivelo was elected national secretary at a party congress on 29 November 1997. He has been exiled in France since 2002 and has been convicted and sentenced in absentia. Ramaholimasy holds the position while Rajaonarivelo is out of the country.

Currently, AREMA is divided into two antagonistic factions: those behind Rajaonarivelo and those who claim to be supported by the party founder, Ratsiraka.

Rajaonarivelo sought to run in the December 2006 presidential election, but was not allowed to enter the country.

The Ratsiraka faction of the party chose not to participate in the September 2007 parliamentary election, while the Rajaonarivelo faction chose to participate. The Ratsiraka faction sought to prevent the Rajaonarivelo faction's participation, but on 23 August the High Constitutional Court ruled that the Rajaonarivelo faction could participate. AREMA did not win any seats in the election.

AREMA's current national secretary, Simon Pierre, and six deputy national secretaries were elected during the party congress on 12 June 2013.

== Ideology ==
As the ruling party of the Democratic Republic of Madagascar, AREMA espoused communism and adhered to Marxism–Leninism and scientific socialism. The party maintained close relations with other communist parties around the world, particularly the Workers' Party of Korea. Ratsiraka expressed strong sympathies and support for the Democratic People's Republic of Korea (North Korea). AREMA hosted the International Scientific Seminar on the Juche Idea in Antananarivo from 28 to 30 September 1976. Many prominent party and government officials, public figures, representatives of revolutionary and progressive organizations, scientists and journalists from more than fifty countries attended.

After the dissolution of the Democratic Republic of Madagascar and the country's adoption of a multi-party system, AREMA began to move towards a more moderate left position. The party currently describes itself as "a humanist and ecological social democratic party". The stated goals of the party are to "build healthy and solid foundations for the construction of a social democracy which guarantees sustained and sustainable growth", and to "consolidate and maintain the independence of Madagascar and the freedom of the Malagasy people, for a just and equitable nation".

== Electoral history ==
=== Presidential elections ===
Election	Candidate	Votes	%	Votes	%	Result
Election	Candidate	First round		Second round		Result
1982	Didier Ratsiraka	3,192,156	80.16%	—	—	Elected ✓
1989	Didier Ratsiraka	2,891,333	62.71%	—	—	Elected ✓
1992–93	Didier Ratsiraka	1,260,193	28.59%	1,378,640	33.26%	Lost ✗
1996	Didier Ratsiraka	1,321,388	36.61%	1,608,321	50.71%	Elected ✓
2001	Didier Ratsiraka	1,701,094	40.61%	—	—	Lost ✗
2018	Didier Ratsiraka	22,222	0.45%	—	—	Lost ✗

=== National Assembly elections ===
Election	Votes	%	Seats	+/−	Position
1977	(in joint list with the CPIM, MCDU, and PMNU)	92%	112 / 137	▲112	▲1st
1983	2,239,771	65.26%	117 / 137	▲5	1st
1989	2,785,448	66.84%	120 / 137	▲3	1st
1993	Did not contest		0 / 134	▼120	N/A
1998		24.74%	63 / 150	▲63	▲1st
2002	189,539	4.90%	3 / 160	▼60	▼3rd
