= Didier Ratsiraka =

President of Madagascar from 1975 to 1993 and 1997 to 2002

His Excellency Didier Ratsiraka
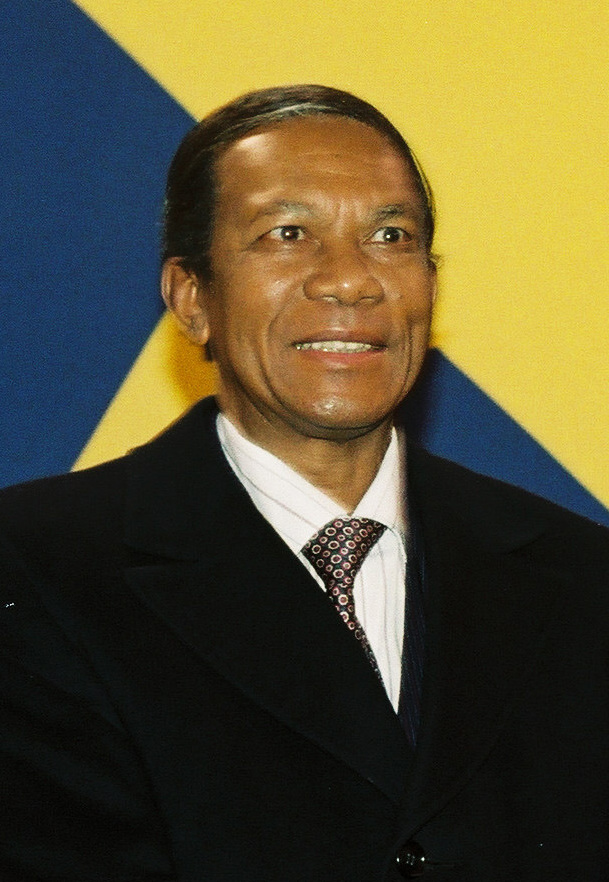
- Ratsiraka in 1997

3rd and 5th President of Madagascar
- In office 9 February 1997 – 5 July 2002
- Prime Minister: Norbert Ratsirahonana; Pascal Rakotomavo; Tantely Andrianarivo
- Preceded by: Norbert Ratsirahonana (acting)
- Succeeded by: Marc Ravalomanana
- In office 15 June 1975 – 27 March 1993
- Prime Minister: Joël Rakotomalala; Justin Rakotoniaina; Désiré Rakotoarijaona; Victor Ramahatra; Guy Razanamasy
- Preceded by: Gilles Andriamahazo (as Chairman of the National Military Leadership Committee)
- Succeeded by: Albert Zafy

Minister of Foreign Affairs of Madagascar
- In office 1972–1975
- President: Gabriel Ramanantsoa
- Preceded by: Jacques Rabemananjara
- Succeeded by: Albert Zakariasy

Personal details
- Born: 4 November 1936 Vatomandry, French Madagascar
- Died: 28 March 2021 (aged 84) Antananarivo, Madagascar
- Party: Malagasy Revolutionary Party
- Spouse: Céline Velonjara (m. 1964)
- Children: 4
- Relatives: Roland Ratsiraka (nephew)

Didier Ignace Ratsiraka (Malagasy: [raˈtsirəkə̥]; 4 November 1936 – 28 March 2021) was a Malagasy politician and naval officer who was the third president of Madagascar from 1975 to 1993 and the fifth from 1997 to 2002. At the time of his death, he was the longest-serving president of Madagascar.

He was first appointed president in 1975 by the military leadership, he was then reelected twice in 1982 and 1989. While he lost to Albert Zafy in 1992, Ratsiraka returned to office after winning the 1997 election. After the 2001 election, he and his opponent Marc Ravalomanana engaged in a lengthy standoff after the latter refused to participate in a runoff election; Ratsiraka eventually stepped down.

== Early life ==
Didier Ratsiraka was born in Vatomandry, Atsinanana Region, French Madagascar, on 4 November 1936. His father, Albert Ratsiraka, was a member of the Parti des déshérités de Madagascar in the Moramanga District and a Malagasy official in the French colonial administration.

Ratsiraka attended Lycée Henri-IV, a prestigious public secondary school in Paris. He then graduated from École navale, the French naval academy, as a naval officer with a bachelor's degree in 1962. He returned to Madagascar, where he began his career as a naval ensign at the French naval and military base in Diego-Suarez.

In 1964, Ratsiraka married Céline Velonjara in a Roman Catholic wedding ceremony. The couple had four children, namely Olga, Sophie, Annick and Xavier.

== Second Republic ==
Ratsiraka initially served as a military attaché at the Embassy of Madagascar in Paris, before being appointed as Minister of Foreign Affairs with President Gabriel Ramanantsoa's transitional government from 1972 until 1975. As foreign minister, Ratsiraka renegotiated the Franco-Malagasy cooperation agreements, which had originally been signed in 1960. He also oversaw Madagascar's departure from the CFA franc zone in 1972.

Known as the "Red Admiral", he was made head of state, as President of the Supreme Revolutionary Council, by the military leadership on 15 June 1975. He was also nicknamed "Deba", a Malagasy word which translates in English to "the Big Man". He began setting up a socialist system, guided by the Charter of the Malagasy Socialist Revolution, which was approved in a referendum held on 21 December 1975, establishing the Second Republic; Ratsiraka was also elected President for a seven-year term in this referendum, which received the backing of 95% of voters according to official results. The political party AREMA was founded in 1976 with Ratsiraka as its secretary-general; together with five other parties, AREMA formed the political alliance called the Vanguard of the Malagasy Revolution (FNDR). All politicians were required to be members of FNDR; AREMA was the dominant party in election results.

In the midst of a poor economic situation, Ratsiraka abandoned socialist policies after a few years in power and implemented reforms recommended by the International Monetary Fund. He was re-elected as president with 80% of the vote in 1982 and with 63% of the vote in 1989. The latter election was condemned as fraudulent by the opposition, which protested, and at least 75 people were killed in the resulting violence.

Ratsiraka faced intense opposition to his rule in 1991. On 10 August 1991, tens of thousands people marched on the Presidential Palace, The government placed the death toll at 11, although other reports placed the toll higher. The incident severely undermined his already precarious position. On 31 October, he signed the Panorama Convention, which established a provisional government and stripped him of most of his powers; although he remained President, opposition leader Albert Zafy became head of the newly established High Authority of the State.

== 1990s elections and second presidency ==
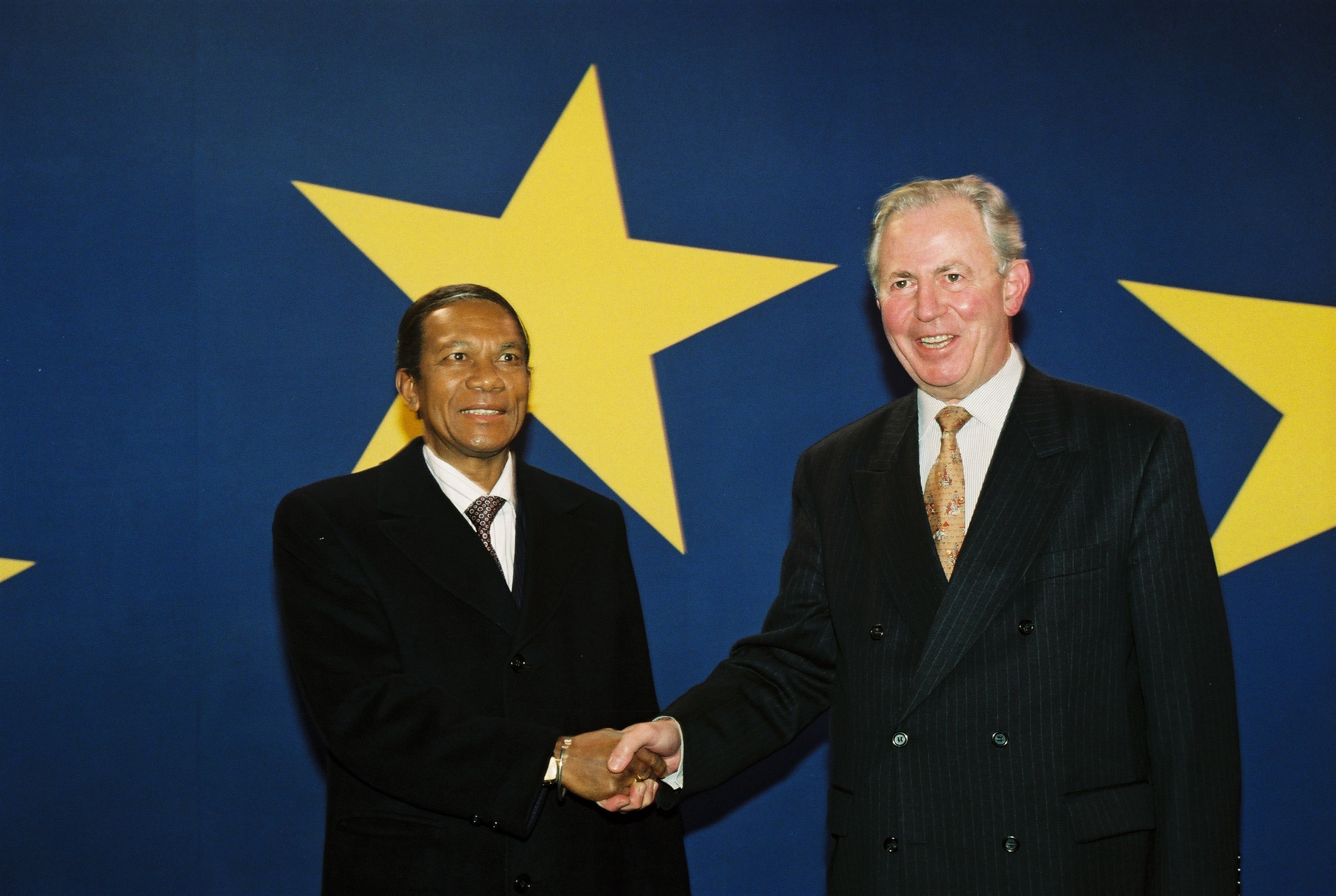
Ratsiraka meeting the President of the European Commission Jacques Santer (1997)

Ratsiraka ran in the multiparty November 1992 presidential election, placing second behind Zafy in the first round. In the second round, held in February 1993, Ratsiraka lost to Zafy, taking about one-third of the vote, and left office on 27 March. Zafy was impeached by the National Assembly of Madagascar in 1996, and Ratsiraka, who had been in exile in France, mounted a political comeback in late 1996 when he won that year's presidential election, running as the candidate of the AREMA party. He came in first place in the first round with 36.6% of the vote, ahead of his three main opponents: Zafy, Herizo Razafimahaleo, and Prime Minister/Acting President Norbert Ratsirahonana. He narrowly defeated Zafy in the runoff with 50.7% of the vote and took office again on 9 February 1997.

Members of the opposition, including Zafy, unsuccessfully attempted to impeach Ratsiraka in February 1998, accusing him of violating the constitution through decentralizing reforms that would increase his own power at the expense of that of the National Assembly. The impeachment motion also accused him of perjury, nepotism, and failing to act as supreme arbiter of disputes, and it cited his ill-health. In the National Assembly vote on 4 February 60 deputies voted for the impeachment motion, well short of the required 92.

On 15 March 1998, a constitutional referendum was held and approved by a narrow majority of voters; this resulted in a major increase in the president's powers, enabling him to dissolve the National Assembly and appoint the prime minister and government without the National Assembly's agreement. It also provided for decentralization, with the provinces gaining autonomy.

== 2001 elections ==
Ratsiraka announced on 26 June 2001 that he would be a candidate for the presidential election to be held in December of that year. In the election, he took second place; according to the government, Marc Ravalomanana won first place with 46% of the vote, while Ratsiraka took 40%. Because, according to the official results, no candidate won a majority, a runoff was to take place, but due to disputes over the election it was never held. Ravalomanana claimed to have won over 50 percent of the vote, enough to win the presidency in a single round. Ravalomanana was sworn in as president by his supporters on 22 February 2002, and the two governments fought for control of the country. By the end of February 2002, Ravalomanana had control over the capital, which had always been his base, but Ratsiraka largely maintained control over the provinces and established himself at Toamasina, his primary support base. However, within a few months Ravalomanana had gained the upper hand in a struggle. In mid-June Ratsiraka went to France, leading many to believe he had fled into exile and lowering the morale of his supporters, although Ratsiraka said he would return. He did return to Madagascar after more than a week, but his position was continuing to weaken militarily. On 5 July, Ratsiraka fled Toamasina, taking a flight to the nearby Seychelles. Two days later he arrived in France.

== In exile ==
On 6 August 2003, Ratsiraka—who was accused of stealing nearly eight million dollars in public funds from the annex of the central bank in Toamasina in June 2002, just before going into exile—was sentenced to ten years of hard labor in Madagascar. Because he was living in France, he was tried in absentia. The lawyer appointed for Ratsiraka by the court accepted the verdict and sentence as "fair" and said he would not appeal.

On 4 August 2009, Ratsiraka met with President of the High Authority of Transition of Madagascar Andry Rajoelina, as well as Ravalomanana (who had himself been ousted and forced into exile) and former president of the Malagasy Republic Albert Zafy, in crisis talks mediated by former Mozambican President Joaquim Chissano and held in Maputo. Ratsiraka's amnesty issue, related to the court sentence that prevented him from returning to Madagascar, was resolved at the talks.

Ratsiraka's nephew Roland Ratsiraka is also a politician. He became the mayor of Toamasina and ran unsuccessfully in the 2006 presidential election, placing third.

== Return from exile and death ==
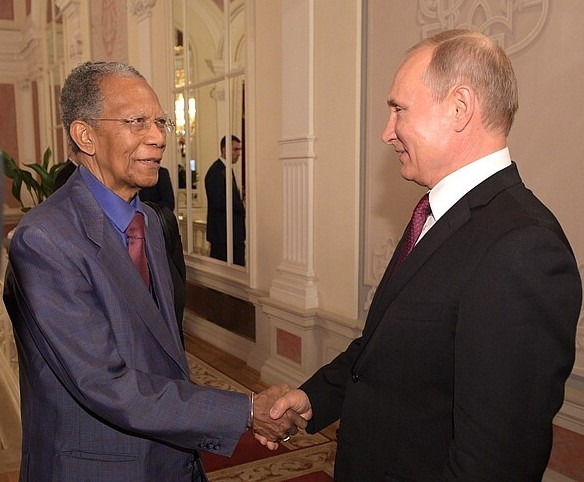
Ratsiraka meeting President of Russia Vladimir Putin in Moscow, on the sidelines of the 2018 FIFA World Cup (15 July 2018)

Ratsiraka returned from exile on 24 November 2011, a move that was welcomed by the Rajoelina government as well as by former presidents (and former opponents) Ravalomanana and Zafy. Ratsiraka called for resolution of the political crisis through direct talks between all four political leaders, talks that should also involve other parties and civil society groups according to him.

Ratsiraka wrote a book with Cécile Lavrard-Meyer, a lecturer at Sciences Po in Paris, which was published by Éditions Karthala in July 2015.

On 22 March 2021, Ratsiraka and his wife, Celine, were both admitted to the Soavinandriana Military Hospital (CENHOSOA) in Antananarivo, for treatment of a "small flu", according to their relatives. Ratsiraka had received a PCR diagnostic test for COVID-19, but the results were negative for coronavirus, according to relatives cited by Jeune Afrique. Several days later, Ratsiraka died from cardiac arrest at CENHOSOA hospital in the early morning of 28 March 2021, at the age of 84.

Ratsiraka was buried in the Ambohitsaina Mausoleum (Mausolée d'Ambohitsaina) in Antananarivo on 29 March 2021. President Andry Rajoelina also declared 29 March as a national day of mourning.

== Awards and honors ==
- Grand Cordon of the National Order of Madagascar
- First Class of Order of the National Flag (North Korea, 1978)
- Grand Companion of Order of the Companions of O. R. Tambo (South Africa, 2019)

== See also ==
- Elysé Ratsiraka

Political offices
Preceded by Gilles Andriamahazo	President of Madagascar; 1975–1993	Succeeded by Albert Zafy
Preceded by Albert Zafy	President of Madagascar; 1997–2002	Succeeded by Marc Ravalomanana
