= List of ambassadors of China to Madagascar =

Coordinates: 18.884564°S 47.549332°E

Chinese Ambassador to Madagascar
- Incumbent; Ji Ping since March 2024
- Inaugural holder: Tsiang Un-kai
- Formation: 1 August 1960; 66 years ago

The Chinese ambassador to Madagascar is the official representative of the People's Republic of China to the Republic of Madagascar.

== List of representatives ==
Diplomatic agrément/Diplomatic accreditation	Ambassador	Chinese language zh:中国驻马达加斯加大使列表	Observations	Premier of the Republic of China	Prime Minister of Madagascar	Term end
August 1, 1960	Tsiang Un-kai	蒋恩铠	Taipei's consulate-general at Tananarive, capital of Madagascar, was raised to the rank of embassy and Chiang Un-k'ai, the former consul-general, was appointed as the first ROC ambassador.	Chen Cheng	Philibert Tsiranana	May 1, 1963
May 1, 1963	Tsiang En-kai	汪公纪		Chen Cheng	Philibert Tsiranana	December 1, 1965
December 1, 1965	Chen Tse-kuei	陳澤溎		Yen Chia-kan	Philibert Tsiranana	December 1, 1972

Diplomatic agrément/Diplomatic accreditation	Ambassador	Chinese language zh:中国驻马达加斯加大使列表	Observations	Premier of the People's Republic of China	Prime Minister of Madagascar	Term end
November 6, 1972			Establishment of diplomatic relations between the governments of the People's Republic of China and Madagascar,	Zhou Enlai	Gabriel Ramanantsoa	
January 1973	Li Yaowen	zh:李耀文	concurrently)	Zhou Enlai	Gabriel Ramanantsoa	June 1974
June 1974	Tian Zhidong	zh:田志东	Chinese ambassador to Madagascar tien chih-tung	Zhou Enlai	Gabriel Ramanantsoa	
August 1979	Gan Yetao	zh:甘野陶		Hua Guofeng	Désiré Rakotoarijaona	March 1982
May 1982	Dai Ping	zh:戴平		Zhao Ziyang	Désiré Rakotoarijaona	February 1985
March 1985	Yang Guirong	zh:杨桂荣		Zhao Ziyang	Désiré Rakotoarijaona	May 1987
June 1987	Wei Dong	zh:韦东		Li Peng	Désiré Rakotoarijaona	January 1991
March 1991	Zhu Chengcai	zh:祝成才		Li Peng	Victor Ramahatra	April 1994
June 1994	Zhao Baozhen	zh:赵宝珍		Li Peng	Francisque Ravony	February 1998
March 1998	Ma Zhixue	zh:马志学		Zhu Rongji	Pascal Rakotomavo	July 2001
August 2001	Xu Jinghu	zh:许镜湖		Zhu Rongji	Tantely Andrianarivo	May 2004
June 2004	Li Shuli	zh:李树立		Wen Jiabao	Jacques Sylla	October 2007
November 2007	Wo Ruidi	zh:沃瑞棣		Wen Jiabao	Charles Rabemananjara	July 2010
July 2010	Shen Yongxiang	zh:沈永祥		Wen Jiabao	Albert Camille Vital	June 2013
July 31, 2013	Yang Min	zh:杨民		Li Keqiang	Omer Beriziky	March 2016
March 2016	Yang Xiaorong	杨小茸		Li Keqiang	Jean Ravelonarivo	November 2020
October 2020	Guo Xiaomei	郭晓梅		Li Keqiang; Li Qiang	Andry Rajoelina	September 2023
March 2024	Ji Ping	季平		Li Qiang	Andry Rajoelina	
