= High Transitional Authority =

Provisional Government in Madagascar

- Fitondrana Avon'ny Tetezamita; Haute autorité de transition

Overview
- Established: 17 March 2009; 17 years ago
- Dissolved: 25 January 2014; 12 years ago
- Country: Madagascar
- Leader: Andry Rajoelina (Chairman)
- Headquarters: Antananarivo

The High Transitional Authority (Malagasy: Fitondrana Avon'ny Tetezamita (FAT); French: Haute autorité de transition or HAT) was a provisional executive body that came to power in Madagascar following the coup that forced Marc Ravalomanana to leave the country on March 17, 2009, as a result of the 2009 Malagasy protests. It was headed by Andry Rajoelina, who appointed members to the body weeks prior to the handing of executive authority from Ravalomanana to the military, which subsequently gave the authority over to the High Transitional Authority.

The HAT was primarily dominated by members of Determined Malagasy Youth, Rajoelina's party.

On September 17, 2011, a "Roadmap for Ending the Crisis in Madagascar," was signed by opposition leaders that was backed by the Southern African Development Community, or SADC. This resolution aimed at creating a stable government once more, and ending the political crisis that endured in Madagascar. The HAT repeatedly rescheduled the general election, which was held on 20 December 2013, following a first round of presidential elections on 25 October. The presidential elections in December were a runoff between Jean Louis Robinson and Hery Rajaonarimampianina, the top two candidates to emerge from the first round of voting in October. The official results of the second round were announced on 7 January 2014 with Rajaonarimampianina proclaimed the victor with nearly 54% of the vote. This election ended the HAT and restored a regular constitutional government in Madagascar.

== Leadership ==
President of the High Transitional Authority
- Filohan'i Fitondrana Avon'ny Tetezamita (Malagasy); Président de Haute autorité de transition (French)
- Seal of Madagascar

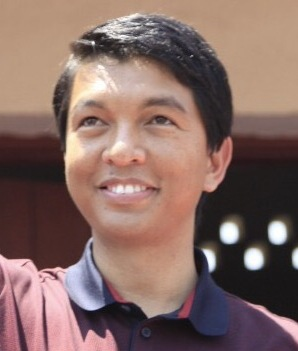
- Andry Rajoelina; 17 March 2009 – 25 January 2014
- Style: Mr President
- Type: Head of state; Commander-in-chief; Junta leader
- Precursor: President
- Formation: 17 March 2009
- First holder: Andry Rajoelina
- Final holder: Andry Rajoelina
- Abolished: 25 January 2014
- Superseded by: President

The president of the High Transitional Authority (Filohan'i Fitondrana Avon'ny Tetezamita, Président de Haute autorité de transition) was the head of the High Transitional Authority. Andry Rajoelina was the only individual to hold the position.

== Government of Omer Beriziky ==
On 28 October 2011, Rajoelina announced the selection of a Prime Minister of consensus, Omer Beriziky, who was responsible for forming a new government of consensus intended to facilitate preparations for internationally recognized presidential elections. The Beriziky government includes the following members (party affiliation in parentheses):

- Jean Omer Beriziky (LEADER-Fanilo), Prime Minister
- Hajo Herivelona Andrianainarivelo, Deputy Prime Minister in charge of development
- Pierrot Botozaza, Deputy Prime Minister in charge of economy and industry
- Pierrot Rajaonarivelo (AREMA), Minister of Foreign Affairs
- Rolland Ravatomanga, Minister of Agriculture
- Olga Ramalason (TIM), Minister of Trade
- Harry Laurent Rahajason, Minister of Communication
- Elia Ravelomanantsoa (Our Madagascar), Minister of Culture and Heritage
- Ruffine Tsiranana, Minister of Decentralisation
- Julien Reboza (AVI), Minister of Water
- Régis Manoro, Minister of Education
- Ihanta Randriamandranto, Minister of Animal Husbandry
- Nestor Razafindrorika, Minister of Energy
- Etienne Hilaire Razafindehibe, Minister of Higher Education
- Jean André Ndremanjary, Minister of Technical Education and Professional Training
- (vacant), Minister of Environment and Forests
- Hery Rajaonarimampianina, Minister of Finance
- Tabera Randriamanantsoa, Minister of the Civil Service
- General Lucien Rakotoarimasy, Minister of the Armed Forces
- Marcel Bernard, Minister of Hydrocarbons
- Florent Rakotoarisoa, Minister of Interior
- Jacques Ulrich Randriantiana, Minister of Youth and Leisure
- Christine Ranazamahasoa, Minister of Justice
- Daniella Randrianfeno Tolotrandry Rajo, Minister of Mines
- Sylvain Manoriky, Minister of Fishery and Ocean Resources
- Olga Vaomalala Ramaroson, Minister of Population
- Andriamanjato Ny Hasina, Minister of Mail, Telecommunication and New Technology
- Elisa Zafitombo Alibena, Minister of Crafts Industry
- Victor Manantsoa, Minister of Relations with Institutions
- Johanita Ndahimananjara (AVI), Minister of Public Health
- Police Controller-General Arsène Rakotondrazaka, Minister of Internal Security
- Gérard Botralahy, Minister of Sports
- Jean Max Rakotomamonjy (LEADER-Fanilo), Minister of Tourism
- Benjamina Ramarcel Ramanantsoa, Minister of Transport
- Colonel Botomanovatsara, Minister of Public Works and Meteorology
- General Randrianazary, Secretary of State at the National Gendarmerie

== Government of Camille Vital ==
The HAT Prime Minister before October 2011 was General Camille Vital. Among the members of his government were:

- Christine Razanamahasoa, Minister of justice
- Organès Rakotomihantarizaka, Minister of homeland security
- Hajo Andrianainarivelo, Minister of Decentralization and Regional Planning
- Masimana Manantsoa, Minister of the Interior
- Benja Razafimahaleo (LEADER-Fanilo), Minister of Finance and Budget
- Julien Razafimanjato, Minister of education
- Augustin Andriamananoro, Minister of telecommunications
- Mario Rakotovao, Minister of the environment

== See also ==
- Politics of Madagascar
