= Prime Minister of Madagascar =

Head of government

- Praiminisitr'i Madagasikara (Malagasy); Premier ministre de Madagascar (French)
- Seal of the Prime Minister of Madagascar

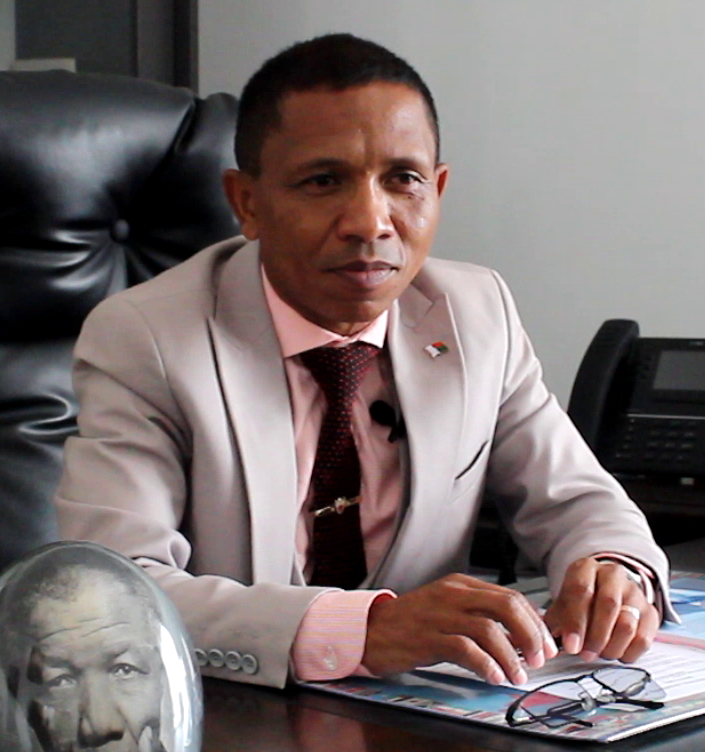
- Incumbent; Mamitiana Rajaonarison since 15 March 2026
- Status: Head of government
- Residence: Mahazoarivo Palace
- Seat: Antananarivo
- Appointer: President of Madagascar
- Inaugural holder: Andriamihaja (Kingdom of Imerina) Gabriel Ramanantsoa (Malagasy Republic)
- Formation: 1828 (Kingdom of Imerina) 18 May 1972 (Malagasy Republic)
- Website: Primature

This is a list of prime ministers of Madagascar, since the establishment of the office of chief minister in 1828, during the Kingdom of Imerina.

== List of officeholders ==
Political parties

Social Democratic Party (PSD)
Malagasy Revolutionary Party (AREMA)
Committee for Support of Democracy and Development in Madagascar (CSDDM)
National Union for Democracy and Development (UNDD)
Judged by Your Work Party (AVI)
I Love Madagascar (TIM)
Madagascar for the Malagasy (Monima)
Young Malagasies Determined (TGV)
Economic Liberalism and Democratic Action for National Recovery (LEADER-Fanilo)

Other factions

Military
Independent

Status

Denotes Acting Prime Minister

=== Imerina ===
No.	Portrait	Name (Birth–Death)	Term of office			Political affiliation	Monarch(s)
No.	Portrait	Name (Birth–Death)	Took office	Left office	Time in office	Political affiliation	Monarch(s)
1		Andriamihaja (died 1833) (Note: Styled as Chief Minister.)	1828	1833	5 years	Independent	Ranavalona I
2		Rainiharo (died 1852)	1833	10 February 1852 (Died in office)	19 years	Independent	Ranavalona I
3		Rainivoninahitriniony (1821–1869)	10 February 1852	14 July 1864 (Deposed)	12 years, 155 days	Independent	Ranavalona I
3		Rainivoninahitriniony (1821–1869)	10 February 1852	14 July 1864 (Deposed)	12 years, 155 days	Independent	Radama II
3		Rainivoninahitriniony (1821–1869)	10 February 1852	14 July 1864 (Deposed)	12 years, 155 days	Independent	Rasoherina
4		Rainilaiarivony (1828–1896)	14 July 1864	14 October 1895 (Deposed)	31 years, 92 days	Independent	Rasoherina
4		Rainilaiarivony (1828–1896)	14 July 1864	14 October 1895 (Deposed)	31 years, 92 days	Independent	Ranavalona II
4		Rainilaiarivony (1828–1896)	14 July 1864	14 October 1895 (Deposed)	31 years, 92 days	Independent	Ranavalona III
5		Rainitsimbazafy	15 October 1895	September 1896 (Removed from office)	10 months	Independent	Ranavalona III
6		Rasanjy (1851–1918) (Note: Styled as Principal Governor.)	September 1896	February 1897	5 months	Independent	Ranavalona III

=== Madagascar ===
No.	Portrait	Name (Birth–Death)	Term of office			Political party	High commissioner(s)
No.	Portrait	Name (Birth–Death)	Took office	Left office	Time in office	Political party	High commissioner(s)
French Madagascar (within the French colonial empire and the French Union)
Post abolished (February 1897 – 27 May 1957)
7		Philibert Tsiranana (1912–1978) (Note: Styled as Vice President of the Executive Council.)	27 May 1957	14 October 1958	1 year, 140 days	PSD	Soudacaux
Malagasy Republic (within the French Community)
(7)		Philibert Tsiranana (1912–1978)	14 October 1958	1 May 1959	199 days	PSD	Soudacaux
Post abolished (1 May 1959 – 26 June 1960)
No.	Portrait	Name (Birth–Death)	Term of office			Political party	President(s)
No.	Portrait	Name (Birth–Death)	Took office	Left office	Time in office	Political party	President(s)
Malagasy Republic (independent)
Post abolished (26 June 1960 – 18 May 1972)
8		Gabriel Ramanantsoa (1906–1979)	18 May 1972	5 February 1975 (Resigned)	2 years, 263 days	Military	Himself
Post abolished (5 February 1975 – 30 December 1975)
Democratic Republic of Madagascar
Post abolished (30 December 1975 – 11 January 1976)
9		Joël Rakotomalala (1929–1976)	11 January 1976	30 July 1976 (Died in office)	201 days	AREMA	Ratsiraka
10		Justin Rakotoniaina (1933–2001)	12 August 1976	1 August 1977	354 days	AREMA	Ratsiraka
11		Désiré Rakotoarijaona (born 1934)	1 August 1977	12 February 1988	10 years, 195 days	Military	Ratsiraka
12		Victor Ramahatra (born 1945)	12 February 1988	8 August 1991	3 years, 177 days	Military	Ratsiraka
13		Guy Razanamasy (1928–2011)	8 August 1991	12 September 1991	35 days	AREMA	Ratsiraka
Third Republic of Madagascar
(13)		Guy Razanamasy (1928–2011)	12 September 1991	9 August 1993	1 year, 331 days	AREMA	Ratsiraka
(13)		Guy Razanamasy (1928–2011)	12 September 1991	9 August 1993	1 year, 331 days	AREMA	Zafy
14		Francisque Ravony (1942–2003)	9 August 1993	30 October 1995	2 years, 82 days	CSDDM	Zafy
15		Emmanuel Rakotovahiny (1938–2020)	30 October 1995	28 May 1996	211 days	UNDD	Zafy
16		Norbert Ratsirahonana (born 1938)	28 May 1996	21 February 1997	269 days	AVI	Zafy
16		Norbert Ratsirahonana (born 1938)	28 May 1996	21 February 1997	269 days	AVI	Himself
16		Norbert Ratsirahonana (born 1938)	28 May 1996	21 February 1997	269 days	AVI	Ratsiraka
17		Pascal Rakotomavo (1934–2010)	21 February 1997	23 July 1998	1 year, 152 days	AREMA	Ratsiraka
18		Tantely Andrianarivo (1954–2023)	23 July 1998	31 May 2002 (Note: Under house arrest by Ravalomanana from 27 May 2002.)	3 years, 312 days	AREMA	Ratsiraka
19		Jacques Sylla (1946–2009)	(26 February 2002); 27 May 2002	20 January 2007	4 years, 238 days	Independent	M. Ravalomanana
—		Jean-Jacques Rasolondraibe (born 1947)	31 May 2002	5 July 2002	35 days	AREMA	Ratsiraka
20		Charles Rabemananjara (born 1947)	20 January 2007	17 March 2009 (Deposed)	2 years, 56 days	TIM	M. Ravalomanana
High Transitional Authority
21		Monja Roindefo (born 1965)	(7 February 2009); 17 March 2009	10 October 2009 (13 November 2009)	207 days	Monima	Rajoelina
22		Eugène Mangalaza (born 1950)	10 October 2009	18 December 2009	69 days	Independent	Rajoelina
—		Cécile Manorohanta	18 December 2009	20 December 2009	2 days	TGV	Rajoelina
23		Albert Camille Vital (born 1952)	20 December 2009	2 November 2011	1 year, 317 days	Military	Rajoelina
24		Omer Beriziky (born 1950)	2 November 2011	16 April 2014	2 years, 165 days	LEADER-Fanilo	Rajoelina
24		Omer Beriziky (born 1950)	2 November 2011	16 April 2014	2 years, 165 days	LEADER-Fanilo	Rajaonarimampianina
Fourth Republic of Madagascar
25		Roger Kolo (born 1943)	16 April 2014	17 January 2015	276 days	Independent	Rajaonarimampianina
26		Jean Ravelonarivo (born 1959)	17 January 2015	13 April 2016	1 year, 87 days	Military	Rajaonarimampianina
27		Olivier Mahafaly Solonandrasana (born 1964)	13 April 2016	4 June 2018	2 years, 52 days	Independent	Rajaonarimampianina
28		Christian Ntsay (born 1961)	4 June 2018	6 October 2025	7 years, 122 days	Independent	Rajaonarimampianina
28		Christian Ntsay (born 1961)	4 June 2018	6 October 2025	7 years, 122 days	Independent	Rakotovao
28		Christian Ntsay (born 1961)	4 June 2018	6 October 2025	7 years, 122 days	Independent	Rajoelina
28		Christian Ntsay (born 1961)	4 June 2018	6 October 2025	7 years, 122 days	Independent	Himself
28		Christian Ntsay (born 1961)	4 June 2018	6 October 2025	7 years, 122 days	Independent	R. Ravalomanana
28		Christian Ntsay (born 1961)	4 June 2018	6 October 2025	7 years, 122 days	Independent	Rajoelina
29		Ruphin Zafisambo	6 October 2025	20 October 2025	14 days	Military	Rajoelina
29		Ruphin Zafisambo	6 October 2025	20 October 2025	14 days	Military	Randrianirina
Council of the Presidency for the Re-Foundation of the Republic of Madagascar
30		Herintsalama Rajaonarivelo	20 October 2025	9 March 2026	140 days	Independent	Randrianirina
Post vacant (9 March 2026 – 15 March 2026)							Randrianirina
31		Mamitiana Rajaonarison	15 March 2026	Incumbent	219 days	Independent	Randrianirina

== See also ==
- Politics of Madagascar
- List of Imerina monarchs
- List of colonial governors of Madagascar
- List of presidents of Madagascar
- Vice President of Madagascar
- First Lady of Madagascar
