= College of Saint Michael, Amparibe =

College of Saint Michael
- French: Collège de Saint-Michel

Location
- Amparibe, Antananarivo; Madagascar
- Coordinates: 18°54′56″S 47°31′31″E

Information
- Type: Private primary and secondary school and technical college
- Motto: Malagasy: Miorim-paka hanasoa olona (Succeed to Help Others)
- Religious affiliation: Catholicism
- Denomination: Jesuit
- Patron saint: Michael (archangel)
- Established: 1888; 138 years ago
- Gender: Co-educational
- Enrollment: 2,200 (1997)
- Website: www.st-michel-amparibe.mg

College of Saint Michael (French: Collège de Saint-Michel) is a private Catholic primary and secondary school and technical college, located in Amparibe, Antananarivo, Madagascar. The co-educational institution was founded in 1888 by the Society of Jesus.

== History ==
In the 1840s six French Jesuits from Lyons began proselytizing and educating the outlying settlements . By 1855 they were able to get into the capital. With the advent of King Radama II in 1861, Christians were free to preach. Thus, the Jesuits and the Sisters of St. Joseph of Cluny settled in the capital, and opened schools and churches.

The internal life of the college survived the abolition of the European section (1906 to 1934). Then followed the start of secondary education (1935), the closing of Madagascar College (1942), and new programs: Philosophy (1952), Elementary Mathematics (1956), Experimental Sciences (1960) and the Baccalaureate (1955). Coeducation began with the first girls admitted in 1966. In 1983 the Higher Technical Institute (1983) opened on the premises. In 1986 the literature sector was restored.

As of 1997, the school's enrollment included 2202 students:, 1340 Catholics, 799 Protestants, and 63 others; 2039 boys and 163 girls.

== Sports ==
Saint-Michel has a swimming club with many good results. Its table tennis teams have won national championships at many levels.

== Notable alumni ==
- Sennen Andriamirado - journalist
- Ludger Andrianjaka - singer
- Jean-Joseph Rabearivelo - poet
- Fulgence Rabeony - Archbishop of Madagascar
- Pascal Rakotomavo - politician
- Justin Rakotoniaina - politician
- Gabriel Ramanantsoa - general
- Ignace Ramarosandratana - first Malagasy bishop
- Didier Ratsiraka - admiral
- Jean-Louis Ravelomanantsoa - athlete
- Francisque Ravony - politician
- Armand Razafindratandra - former Cardinal Archbishop of Madagascar

== See also ==
- Catholic Church in Madagascar
- Education in Madagascar
- List of Jesuit schools
