= Norbert Ratsirahonana =

Malagasy politician (born 1938)

Norbert Lala Ratsirahonana
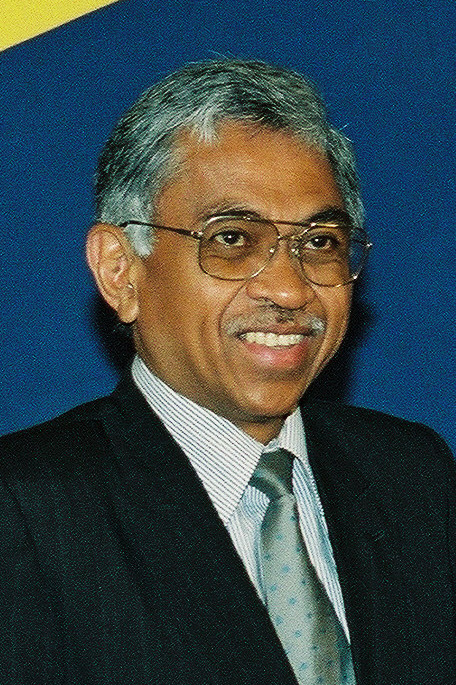
- Ratsirahonana in 1996

Acting President of Madagascar
- In office 5 September 1996 – 9 February 1997
- Prime Minister: Himself
- Preceded by: Albert Zafy
- Succeeded by: Didier Ratsiraka

16th Prime Minister of Madagascar
- In office 28 May 1996 – 21 February 1997
- President: Albert Zafy; Himself (acting); Didier Ratsiraka
- Preceded by: Emmanuel Rakotovahiny
- Succeeded by: Pascal Rakotomavo

Personal details
- Born: 18 November 1938 (age 87) Antsiranana, French Madagascar
- Party: Judged by Your Work Party (AVI)
- Spouse: Sahondra Rakotondravaly Ratsirahonana

Norbert Lala Ratsirahonana (born 18 November 1938) is a Malagasy politician who served as the 16th prime minister of Madagascar and acting president of Madagascar from 1996 to 1997.

== Life and career ==
He was born in Antsiranana, Diana Region He founded and led the Asa Vita no Ifampitsarana (Judged By Your Work) Party, which opposed President Didier Ratsiraka. He and his party were part of the coalition which elected Albert Zafy to the presidency in 1993. Ratsirahonana then became President of the High Constitutional Court.

On 28 May 1996, when the prime minister was deposed by Parliament in a no confidence vote, Zafy appointed Ratsirahonana to the post. Soon afterward, Zafy was impeached and, on 5 September 1996, Ratsirahonana became acting President of Madagascar. A presidential election was held on 3 November 1996, in which Ratsirahonana ran, taking fourth place (behind Ratsiraka, Zafy and Herizo Razafimahaleo) and 10.14% of the vote. Ratsirahonana backed Zafy in the second round, which was held on 29 December, but Ratsiraka narrowly prevailed; Ratsirahonana left office as President when Ratsiraka was sworn in, on 9 February 1997. Twelve days later, he also lost his position as Prime Minister when Ratsiraka appointed one of his own allies. The AVI then became the main opposition party, though it became very weak, winning only 13 of the 150 seats in the 1998 parliamentary election.

Ratsirahonana became Chairman of the National Executive Committee of the Panorama Group opposition coalition in September 1997.

Ratsirahonana withdrew from the December 2001 presidential election and endorsed the candidacy of Marc Ravalomanana. He was appointed as the president's "roaming ambassador" under the Ravalomanana administration. In 2006, however, Ratsirahonana resigned from his office; in August 2006 he announced his candidacy for the December 2006 presidential election. According to official results, he received 4.22% of the vote and took fifth place. His best result was in Antananarivo Province, where he received 7.14% of the vote.

Amidst the 2009 political crisis, when the military announced that it was installing opposition leader Andry Rajoelina as head of state on 17 March 2009, Ratsirahonana was present as master of ceremonies. Rajoelina then set up the High Authority of the Transition (HAT) as the ruling body, and Ratsirahonana was appointed as one of the HAT's 44 members on 31 March 2009.

Political offices
Preceded by Albert Zafy	President of Madagascar (acting); 1996-1997	Succeeded by Didier Ratsiraka
Preceded by Emmanuel Rakotovahiny	Prime Minister of Madagascar; 1996–1997	Succeeded by Pascal Rakotomavo
