= Benja =

Benja may refer to:

- Šimun Kožičić Benja (1460–1536), Croatian nobleman
- Benja Razafimahaleo (born 1957), Malagasy politician
- Benja Bruijning (born 1983), Dutch actor
- Benja (footballer) (born 1987), Spanish footballer
