= Jonah Parfait Prezaly =

Malagasy politician

Jonah Parfait Prezaly is a Malagasy politician who served as a member of the High Authority of the Transition (HAT) under President Andry Rajoelina. He was a member of the Economic Liberalism and Democratic Action for National Recovery (LEADER-Fanilo) party.

He was elected to the National Assembly of Madagascar in the September 2007 parliamentary election as the LEADER-Fanilo candidate in the constituency of Befandriana Nord, and he was the only LEADER-Fanilo candidate to win a seat.

President Marc Ravalomanana was forced to resign amidst a political crisis in March 2009, and opposition leader Andry Rajoelina took power. Rajoelina set up the High Authority of the Transition (HAT) as the ruling body, and Prezaly was appointed as one of the HAT's 44 members on 31 March 2009.

He was re-elected for the party Matita in the Befandriana-Nord District in 2019.
