= Li Chao =

Li Chao is the name of:

- Li Chao (golfer) (born 1980), Chinese professional golfer
- Li Chao (footballer) (born 1987), Chinese football player
- Li Chao (chess player) (born 1989), Chinese chess grandmaster
- Li Chao (diplomat), ambassador of China to Estonia since 2017
