= Herizo Razafimahaleo =

Malagasy politician

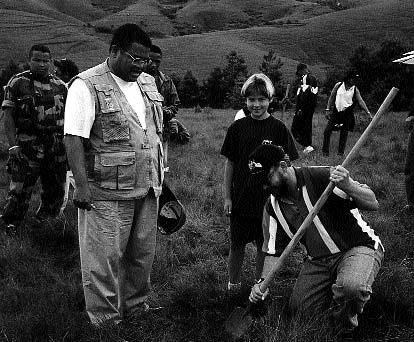
Razafimahaleo planting trees with U.S. embassy staff (1998)

Herizo Jossicher Razafimahaleo (February 21, 1955 – July 25, 2008) was a politician in Madagascar. He ran for President three times, and he served as Deputy Prime Minister and Foreign Minister from 1997 to 1998.

As a youth, Herizo Razafimahaleo was a prominent Malagasy swimmer and set his country's record for being the longest uninterrupted breaststroke champion.

He attended the University of Antananarivo and later the University of Michigan's Ross School of Business where he obtained his MBA (later on in his life he also attended the University of Cambridge and Harvard's John F. Kennedy School of Government).

Razafimahaleo was economic adviser to President Didier Ratsiraka from 1989 to 1991. He founded the LEADER Fanilo party in 1992 and was elected to the National Assembly in June 1993 from Ambositra. Razafimahaleo was named Minister of Industrial Promotion and Tourism in the government of Prime Minister Francisque Ravony in August 1993, but resigned from this position in July 1994. He founded the newspaper L'Express de Madagascar in 1995.

Razafimahaleo was the LEADER-Fanilo candidate in the November 1996 presidential election, winning 15.13% of the vote and taking third place. On December 28 he announced his support for Ratsiraka in the second round of the election, which was held on the next day; Razafimahaleo's support has been considered crucial in enabling Ratsiraka's narrow victory over former president Albert Zafy.

Ratsiraka took office as president on February 9, 1997, and in the new government of Prime Minister Pascal Rakotomavo, named on February 27, Razafimahaleo became Deputy Prime Minister in charge of Foreign Affairs; he was one of three deputy prime ministers. He was not included in the subsequent government of Prime Minister Tantely Andrianarivo, formed in July 1998.

Razafimahaleo was again a candidate in the December 2001 presidential election, winning about 4% of the vote and taking fourth place. Amidst the crisis that followed this election, with Ratsiraka and his main challenger, Marc Ravalomanana, disputing the election results, Razafimahaleo resigned as National President of LEADER-Fanilo and withdrew from politics on May 18, 2002.

He began a return to active politics with a press conference on January 24, 2006, in which he was sharply critical of Ravalomanana. He officially announced on September 1, 2006, that he would run for president again in the December 2006 election. In the days prior to the election some observers considered him the main challenger to Ravalomanana, the incumbent president. Razafimahaleo took 9.03% of the vote and came in fourth place according to official results. His best result was in Antsiranana Province, where he won 22.44% of the vote, followed by Fianarantsoa Province, where he won 16.37%.

Razafimahaleo opposed the constitutional changes proposed in the 2007 constitutional referendum and participated in a national committee that campaigned for a "no" vote as a coordinator of action.

Razafimahaleo died on 25 July 2008 in Antananarivo after being hospitalized due to renal failure that led to dehydration. He suffered four heart attacks and died in the hospital. His family declined any posthumous honors for Razafimahaleo from the government. His body was taken from Antananarivo to Ambositra on July 29 for his funeral there on July 30.

Herizo Razafimahaleo is credited with a significant political legacy and is frequently referred to as the father of political ethics in Madagascar.
