= Mahazoarivo Palace =

- Lapan'i Mahazoarivo
- Interactive map of the Mahazoarivo Palace area

General information
- Type: Official residence
- Architectural style: Georgian-inspired
- Location: Antananarivo, Razerôma Street, Mahazoarivo, Madagascar
- Coordinates: 18°56′33″S 47°32′47″E
- Current tenants: Vacant (Prime Minister of Madagascar)
- Construction started: c. 1800
- Completed: 1827 (stone reconstruction)
- Renovated: 2019
- Destroyed: 1826 (gunpowder explosion)
- Owner: State of Madagascar

Website
- https://www.primature.gov.mg/

The Mahazoarivo Palace (in Malagasy: Lapan'i Mahazoarivo) is the official residence and office of the Prime Minister of Madagascar. It is located at the southern end of Razerôma Street in the eponymous Mahazoarivo fokontany in the second arrondissement of Antananarivo. The building, made of red brick and painted red, was constructed during the 19th century and is inspired by Georgian architecture. It has been the residence, workplace, and reception venue for all Malagasy Prime Ministers since Désiré Rakotoarijaona, the third Prime Minister of the 2nd Republic, who moved in in 1977.

The term "Mahazoarivo" is often used metonymically to refer to the Prime Minister's administration.

Since 9 March 2026, the residence has been vacant. Herintsalama Rajaonarivelo the 30th Prime Minister of Madagascar occupied the residence from his appointment on 20 October 2025, till his dismissal on 09 March 2026.

== History ==
The Mahazoarivo estate was built on the orders of King Andrianampoinimerina to serve as a leisure retreat for Ilaidama, his eldest son and successor. The estate initially consisted of two "tranokotona mitafo herana" dwellings.

The estate gets its name from the blessing given to the local inhabitants by the king when their lands were requisitioned:

Mahazoa zato, mahazoa arivo

=== From 1810 to 1958 ===
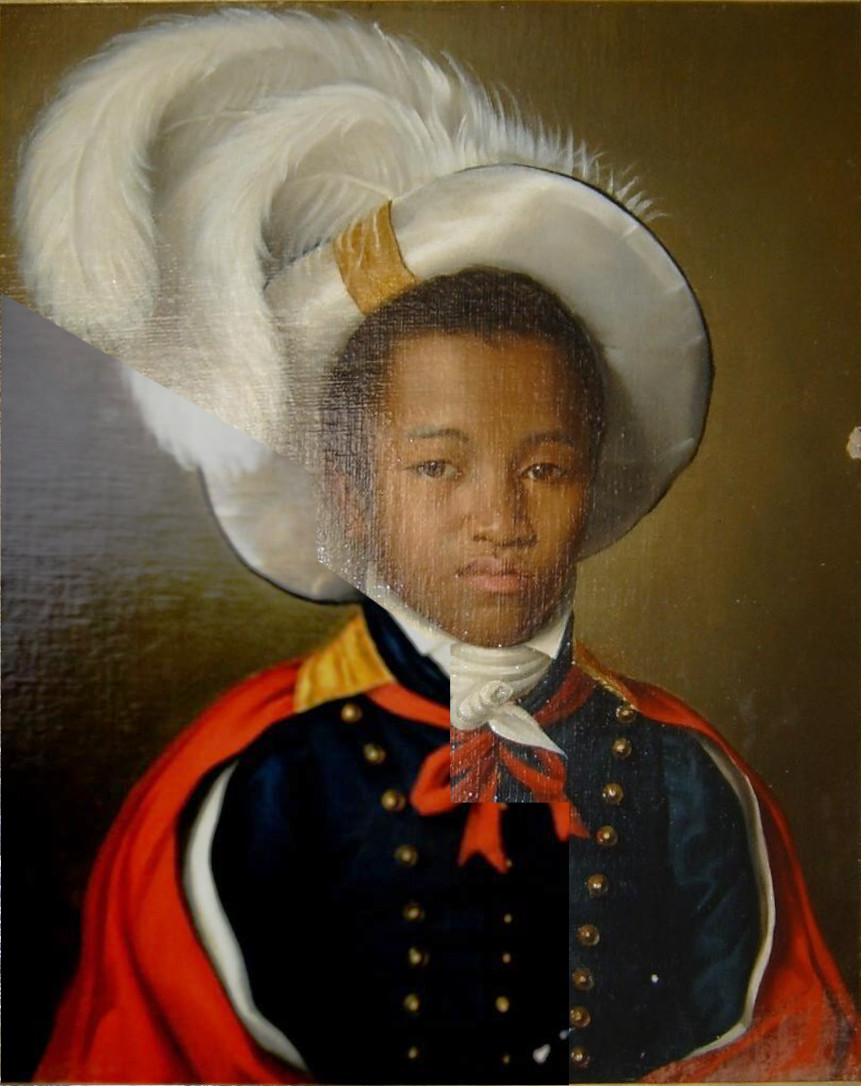
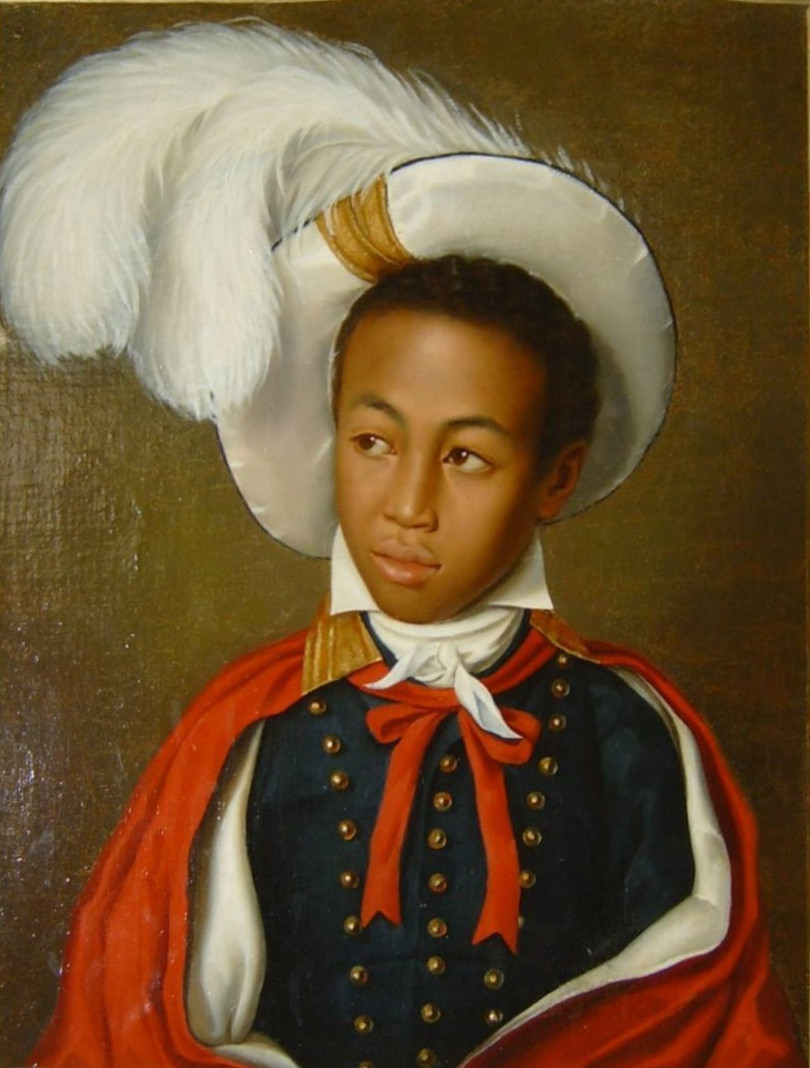
Ratafika and Rahovy, half-brothers of Radama I sent to be educated in Mauritius

During the reign of Radama 1st, Mahazoarivo evolved beyond a leisure retreat into a state palace, an annex to those of the Rova of Antananarivo . Radama regularly resided there and used it to receive foreign diplomats. As such, Chardenoux, an envoy of Sir Robert Farquhar, the governor of Mauritius, was received there in 1816. Upon his return from his mission, he was accompanied by two of the King's brothers, Ratafika and Rahovy, and important court personalities.

In 1826, Mahazoarivo was razed by a gunpowder magazine explosion in which the king nearly perished. His Majesty ordered its immediate reconstruction, erecting Tranokintana, a residence composed of 3 rooms surrounded by numerous smaller dwellings, by the lake. This reconstruction was accompanied by the creation of a park and gardens at the entrance of which two immense RR (Radama Rex) letters were inscribed in greenery, framing flower beds.

In 1855, Prince Rakotondradama and his wife Rasoherina received the Reverend William Ellis of the London Missionary Society, sent to Madagascar as an official emissary, at Mahazoarivo. Upon coming to power, Radama II had a stone building with a flat roof serving as a terrace built, surrounded by a vast garden allowing for more convivial receptions, particularly that of Commander Marie Jules Dupré, who initially came to represent France at his coronation, for the signing of a trade agreement between the Great Island and France. Radama II took religious care of his father's favorite residence by the lake.

Queen Ranavalona II, for her part, proceeded to build a brick dwelling and to diversify the botanical and arboricultural heritage of the park through the planting of trees and plants ordered from Europe. Swans adorned the lake waters. The custom of a grand party held at the new year with open-air snacks, games, and regatta spectacles was then established. She received the French ambassador, Commissioner Théodore-Charles Meyer, there in 1881.

Mahazoarivo continued, until the time of Ranavalona III, to serve as a leisure retreat and a reception venue for guests of the Royal Government. Official ceremonies were often held there. Prime Minister Rainilaiarivony received Hicks Groves, the ambassador of the United Kingdom to Madagascar, there on 28 June 1884.

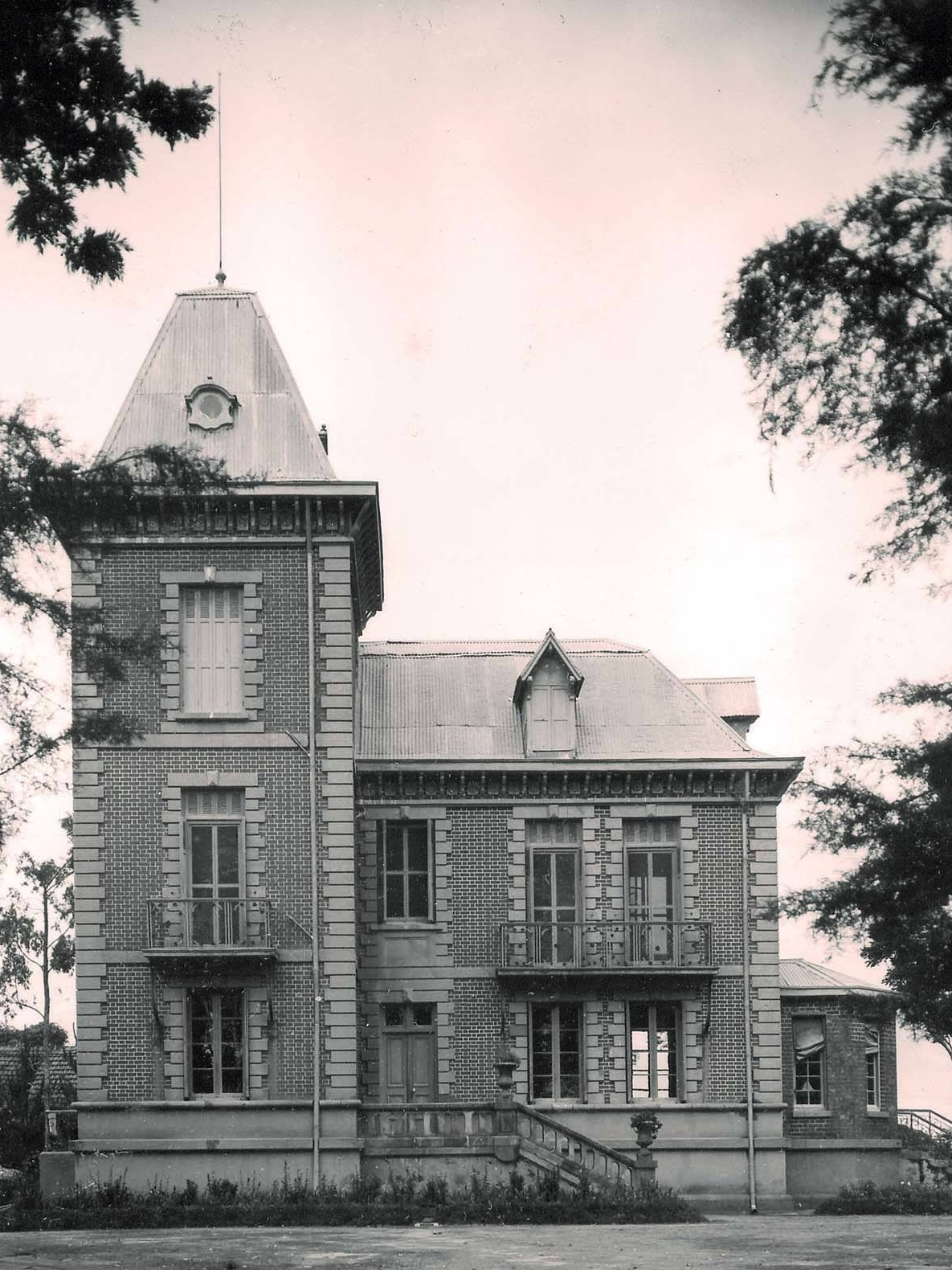
The Mahazoarivo Palace in 1939.

The pavilion as it is known today was erected under the French colonial administration by Governor General Joseph Gallieni. From then on, Mahazoarivo became the summer residence of the Governors General, leaving the offices at the Ambohitsorohitra Palace.

=== Since 1958 ===
Following the proclamation of Madagascar's autonomy and then the First Republic, the Mahazoarivo Palace became the official residence of the President of the Republic, with the Andafiavaratra Palace housing only the offices of the presidential administration.

Following the construction of the Iavoloha Palace in the capital's suburbs by Didier Ratsiraka, the Mahazoarivo Palace became the official residence and offices of the Prime Minister of Madagascar. Désiré Rakotoarijaona was its first occupant in this capacity, moving in in 1977.

In 2019, the main pavilion underwent significant rehabilitation work, the first since independence.

== Composition of the estate ==
The Mahazoarivo estate is composed of the Mahazoarivo Palace, the Tranokintana, and other administrative buildings.

The main pavilion houses the apartment and office of the Prime Minister. The offices of the Prime Minister's team members are located in the Tranokintana, the building by the lake erected by Radama I. Government councils are also held in this building.

The complex also includes a basketball court and a tennis court.
