= Benja Razafimahaleo =

Malagasy politician

Benja Razafimahaleo is a Malagasy politician who served as Minister of Finance in the government of Madagascar from March 2009 to September 2009.

== LEADER-Fanilo ==
Razafimahaleo is the brother of Herizo Razafimahaleo, a major political figure from the 1990s and former president of the LEADER-Fanilo political party, who died in 2008. Benja was Director-General of Sacimem for a time. Following Herizo's death, LEADER-Fanilo's national council chose Manassé Esoavelomandroso as the party's National President in early September 2008, while Benja Razafimahaleo was chosen as one of four vice-presidents.

== 2009 political crisis ==
Razafimahaleo was appointed Minister of Finance and the Budget in the rival government of opposition leader Andry Rajoelina on 10 February 2009. As the political crisis involving Rajoelina and President Marc Ravalomanana escalated, Rajoelina's supporters installed Razafimahaleo in the Finance Ministry with the help of the military on 12 March 2009. Rajoelina took over the Presidency with the military's assistance a few days later.

Razafimahaleo was dismissed from the government on 8 September 2009.
