= Johanita Ndahimananjara =

Malagasy politician (born 1960)

Johanita Bénédicte Ndahimananjara (born June 5, 1960, in Maroantsetra) is a medical practitioner and Malagasy politician. She is a member of the Senate of Madagascar for Analanjirofo, and is a member of the AVI party. She was the

- Minister of Water Ressources in the government of Roger Kolo (April 2014 - 2016)
- Health Minister of Madagascar (2016 - ).

She was also Minister of Environment.
