= 1995 Malagasy constitutional referendum =

| 17 September 1995 |

Results
| Choice | Votes | % |
|---|---|---|
| Yes | 2,139,378 | 63.56% |
| No | 1,226,286 | 36.44% |
| Valid votes | 3,365,664 | 87.31% |
| Invalid or blank votes | 489,128 | 12.69% |
| Total votes | 3,854,792 | 100.00% |
| Registered voters/turnout | 5,894,982 | 65.39% |

A constitutional referendum was held in Madagascar on 17 September 1995. The proposed amendment would allow the President to appoint and sack the Prime Minister rather than the National Assembly. It was approved by 64% of voters, with a 65% turnout.

== Results ==
| Choice | Votes | % |
|---|---|---|
| For | 2,139,378 | 63.56 |
| Against | 1,226,286 | 36.44 |
| Invalid/blank votes | 489,128 | - |
| Total | 3,854,792 | 100 |
Source: EISA
