= Emmanuel Rakotovahiny =

Malagasy politician (1938–2020)

15th Prime Minister of Madagascar
- In office 30 October 1995 – 28 May 1996
- President: Albert Zafy
- Preceded by: Francisque Ravony
- Succeeded by: Norbert Ratsirahonana

Personal details
- Born: 16 August 1938
- Died: 1 July 2020 (aged 81)
- Party: National Union for Democracy and Development

Emmanuel Rakotovahiny (16 August 1938 – 1 July 2020) was a Malagasy politician who was Prime Minister of Madagascar from 1995 to 1996. A close ally of Albert Zafy, he was the President of the National Union for Democracy and Development (UNDD), a political party, as well as the Vice President of the National Reconciliation Committee (CRN), a group headed by Zafy. On 6 October 2009, he was designated to become Vice President of Madagascar as part of an agreement intended to resolve the 2009 political crisis.

Political offices
Preceded by Francisque Ravony	Prime Minister of Madagascar; 1995–1996	Succeeded by Norbert Ratsirahonana
