= 1996 Malagasy presidential election =

- 3 November 1996 (first round); 29 December 1996 (second round)
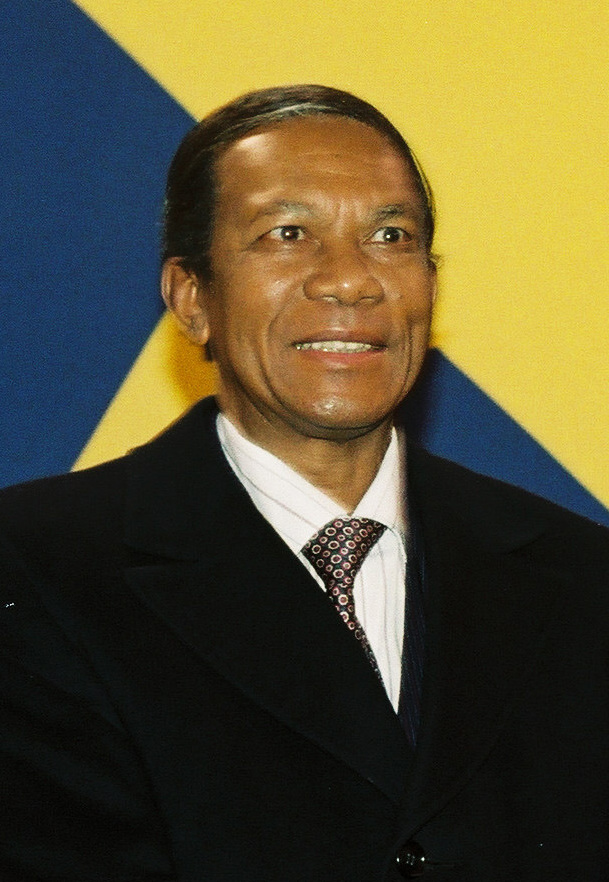

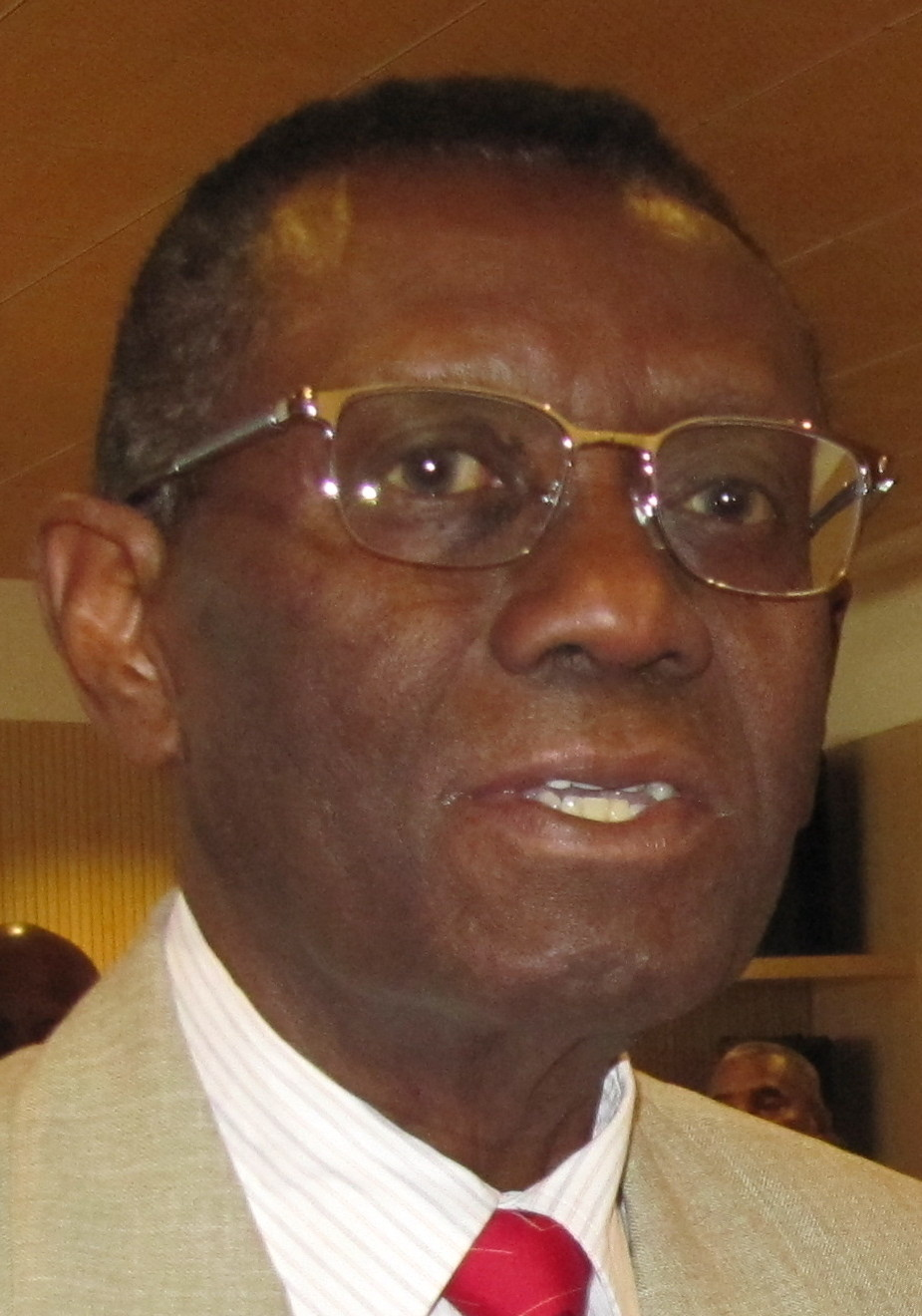
Nominee	Didier Ratsiraka	Albert Zafy
Party	AREMA	UNDD
Popular vote	1,608,321	1,563,137
Percentage	50.71%	49.29%
President before election
Norbert Ratsirahonana
AVI
Elected President
Didier Ratsiraka
AREMA

Presidential elections were held in Madagascar on 3 November 1996, with a second round on 29 December 1996. The election followed the impeachment of incumbent President Albert Zafy and the appointment of his interim successor, Norbert Ratsirahonana. Didier Ratsiraka won a narrow victory after a runoff.

== Background ==
Madagascar became independent from France in 1960, forming the First Republic of Madagascar. After student-led protests in 1972, then-President Philibert Tsiranana turned over control to General Gabriel Ramanantsoa. In 1975, Didier Ratsiraka was named as President, and confirmed by a referendum. This began the Second Republic of Madagascar. Ratsiraka held a tight grip on power until 1991, when protests led by Albert Zafy led to the Panorama Convention, beginning a governmental transition. A 1992 constitutional referendum established the Third Republic, with its first presidential election in 1993.

Ratsiraka was unpopular by the time the 1993 election came, in part because he had been recorded ordering the presidential guard to shoot unarmed protestors during the 1991 unrest. Zafy defeated Ratsiraka in the 1993 election handily, 67% to 33%. Once in power, Zafy chafed at the constraints the new constitution placed on the president. In 1995, he successfully spearheaded a referendum to amend the constitution to centralize power in the presidency. However, the National Assembly objected to his centralization of power, and in July 1996, they impeached Zafy. The High Constitutional Court ratified the impeachment in September, but Zafy was allowed to run in the election scheduled for November 1996.

== Candidates ==
Three incumbent or former Presidents ran in this election: Ratsiraka, Zafy, and Norbert Ratsirahonana, who was named acting President after Zafy was impeached. The fourth candidate with a significant voter base was Herizo Razafimahaleo, the former Minister for Industrial Promotion.

== Election ==
In the first round, former President Didier Ratsiraka took first place with 36.6% of the vote with a turnout of 58.41%. However, as he failed to win more than 50% of the vote, a second round was held, in which Zafy, who had been able to run despite his impeachment, was the sole alternative.

LEADER-Fanilo candidate Herizo Razafimahaleo, who took third place with 15.1%, backed Ratsiraka for the second round. Ratsirahonana, the acting President and Prime Minister, who stood as a candidate and received fourth place with 10.1% of the vote, backed Zafy.

In the second round, Ratsiraka achieved a narrow victory. On 6 January 1997, Zafy alleged that vote rigging and irregularities had occurred. Final results confirming Ratsiraka's victory were announced by the High Constitutional Court on 31 January, and he was sworn in on 9 February. Zafy conceded defeat in early 1997.

== Results ==
Candidate	Party	First round		Second round	
Candidate	Party	Votes	%	Votes	%
Didier Ratsiraka	AREMA	1,321,388	36.61	1,608,321	50.71
Albert Zafy	National Union for Development and Democracy	844,459	23.39	1,563,137	49.29
Herizo Razafimahaleo	Economic Liberalism and Democratic Action for National Recovery	546,211	15.13		
Norbert Ratsirahonana	Judged by Your Work Party	365,896	10.14		
Richard Andriamanjato	Party of the Independence Congress of Madagascar - Renewal	178,352	4.94		
Jean Eugène Voninahitsy	Independent	100,652	2.79		
Alain Ramaroson	Independent	55,930	1.55		
Guy Willy Razanamasy	Confederation of Civil Societies for Development	42,873	1.19		
Jérôme Marojama Razanabahiny	Independent	32,812	0.91		
Tovonanahary Rabetsitonta	Action and Reflection Group for the Development of Madagascar	32,518	0.90		
Philippe Rakotovao	Independent	28,777	0.80		
Evariste Vazaha	Independent	16,071	0.45		
Albert Andriamanana	Independent	15,202	0.42		
Charles Ramanantsoa	Independent	15,160	0.42		
Désiré Rakotoarijaona	Independent	13,488	0.37		
Total		3,609,789	100.00	3,171,458	100.00
Valid votes		3,609,789	95.76	3,171,458	95.79
Invalid/blank votes		159,834	4.24	139,444	4.21
Total votes		3,769,623	100.00	3,310,902	100.00
Registered voters/turnout		6,453,612	58.41	6,667,192	49.66
Source: EISA, Nohlen et al.
