= Guy Razanamasy =

Prime Minister of Madagascar

Guy Willy Razanamasy

13th Prime Minister of Madagascar
- In office 8 August 1991 – 9 August 1993
- President: Didier Ratsiraka; Albert Zafy
- Preceded by: Victor Ramahatra
- Succeeded by: Francisque Ravony

Mayor of Antananarivo
- In office 14 November 1994 – 14 November 1999
- Preceded by: Unknown (Presumably Vacant)
- Succeeded by: Marc Ravalomanana

Personal details
- Born: 19 December 1928 Antananarivo, French Madagascar
- Died: 18 May 2011 (aged 82)
- Party: AREMA

Guy Willy Razanamasy (19 December 1928 – 18 May 2011) was a Malagasy politician who served as Prime Minister of Madagascar from 1991 to 1993.

Born in Antananarivo, Razanamasy worked as a pharmacist and drug manufacturer before becoming the director of pharmacological society of "cofarma" and entering politics. He was elected Mayor of Antananarivo in the 1980s.

President of Madagascar Didier Ratsiraka came under intense pressure in August 1991. Facing a general strike, a rival government formed by the Committee of Active Forces (FV) and led by Jean Rakotoharison, and an army reluctant to obey his orders, he replaced Prime Minister of Madagascar Victor Ramahatra with Razanamasy. Razanamasy called on the FV to join his government, and was able to persuade a few individuals to enter his first cabinet, then in October was able to sign an accord with the opposition to form a transitional government for a maximum of eighteen months. Although all real power was removed from Ratsiraka, Razanamasy remained in position and members of the FV joined his expanded cabinet. He retained the post until 1993.

In 1994, Razanamasy again became Mayor of Antananarivo, serving out his five-year term. He stood in the 1996 presidential election as the candidate of the Confederation of Civil Societies for Development, but took only 1.2% of the total votes cast and was eliminated in the first round.

Political offices
Preceded by ?	Mayor of Antananarivo ?–1991	Succeeded by ?
Preceded by ?	Mayor of Antananarivo; 1994–1999	Succeeded by Marc Ravalomanana
Preceded by Victor Ramahatra	Prime Minister of Madagascar; 1991–1993	Succeeded by Francisque Ravony
