= 1998 Malagasy parliamentary election =

Parliamentary elections were held in Madagascar on 17 May 1998. Vanguard of the Malagasy Revolution, the party led by President Didier Ratsiraka, emerged as the largest faction in the National Assembly, winning 63 of the 150 seats. However, independent candidates won more votes than any party.

== Results ==
Party	Votes	%	Seats	+/–
Vanguard of the Malagasy Revolution		24.74	63	New
Economic Liberalism and Democratic Action for National Recovery		13.32	16	+3
Judged by Your Work Party		6.90	14	New
Rally for Socialism and Democracy		4.75	11	+3
Action, Truth, Development and Harmony		4.60	6	New
Movement for Proletarian Power			3	–12
Congress Party for the Independence of Madagascar – Renewal			3	–2
Confederation of Civil Societies for Development			1	New
Action and Reflection Group for the Development of Madagascar			1	0
Other parties			0	–
Independents		26.81	32	+32
Total			150	+16
Total votes	3,147,368	–		
Registered voters/turnout	5,234,198	60.13		
Source: EISA
