= Health Minister (Madagascar) =

Minister of Health is a government minister in charge of the Madagascar's Ministry of Public Health (Ministère de la Santé Publique) of Madagascar.

== List ==
- Jean Jacques Seraphin (before 1976 - after 1986)
- Jean Louis Robinson 2004 - 2006 (government of Jacques Sylla)
- Jean Louis Robinson 2007-2008 (government of Charles Rabemananjara)
- Johanita Ndahimananjara (before 2011-after 2013)
- Mamy Lalatiana Andriamanarivo (January 2015 - June 2018)
- Harinirina Yoël Honora Rantomalala (06.2018- 01.2019)
- Julio Rakotonirina (24.01.2019-Jan.2020)
- Ahmad Ahmad (Jan.2020-Aug 2020)
- Jean Louis Hanitrala Rakotovao (Aug 2020-)
- Zely Arivelo Randriamanantany (2021-2025)
- Monira Managna (Nov 2025- )

== See also ==
- Health minister
