= Guo Xiaomei =

Chinese diplomat

- 郭晓梅

Chinese Ambassador to Estonia
- Incumbent
- Assumed office September 2023
- Preceded by: Li Chao

Chinese Ambassador to Madagascar
- In office October 2020 – September 2023
- Preceded by: Yang Xiaorong
- Succeeded by: Ji Ping

Personal details
- Born: March 1971 (age 55) China
- Party: Chinese Communist Party

Guo Xiaomei (Chinese: 郭晓梅) is a Chinese diplomat who is serving as the Chinese ambassador to Estonia since 2023. She previously served as the Chinese ambassador to Madagascar from 2020 to 2023.

== Diplomatic career ==
From 1995 to 1997, Guo served as a staff member and attaché of the Department of Treaty and Law at the Ministry of Foreign Affairs of the People's Republic of China. Following this, from 1997 to 1999, she held the positions of attaché and third secretary at the Chinese Representative Office of the Sino-Portuguese Joint Liaison Group during the handover of Macau. From 1999 to 2000, she continued as a third secretary at the Office of the Commissioner of the Ministry of Foreign Affairs in the Macao Special Administrative Region. Her career progressed within the Ministry of Foreign Affairs' Department of Treaty and Law, where from 2000 to 2009, she advanced from third secretary to deputy director, and ultimately to director.

From 2009 to 2013, Guo served as counselor at the Permanent Mission of China to the United Nations. This was followed by a tenure as counselor in the Department of Treaty and Law from 2013 to 2017. Between 2017 and 2020, she was the Deputy Director-General of the same department.

=== Ambassador to Madagascar (2020–2023) ===
In October 2020, she was appointed as the Ambassador Extraordinary and Plenipotentiary to the Republic of Madagascar and in November 2020, she presented her credentials to President of Madagascar Andry Rajoelina. During her tenure as ambassador to Madagascar, in May 2022, China donated 3000 books consisting of children's versions of Chinese classical novels and books about traditional Chinese culture, for the opening of a reading room at school Le Petit Nid in Antananarivo. In April 2023, China Eximbank has announced that it will grant a $240 million preferential credit to finance the construction of the Ranomafana hydroelectric power station, with Sinohydro poised to construct it. Guo described it as "the largest financing cooperation project between China and Madagascar since the establishment of diplomatic relations." Guo's tenure as ambassador to Madagascar ended in September 2023.

=== Ambassador to Estonia (2023–present) ===
In September 2023, Guo was appointed as the Ambassador Extraordinary and Plenipotentiary to the Republic of Estonia and in October 2023, she presented her credentials to President of Estonia Alar Karis.

In November 2023, the Ministry of Foreign Affairs of Estonia announced that it would allow Taiwan to set up a representative office in Estonia. Following the announcement, in a meeting with the chairman of the Estonia-China parliamentary group Toomas Kivimägi on November 9 regarding the plans for establishment of the representative office and Minister of Foreign Affairs of Taiwan Joseph Wu's unofficial visit to Estonia a day earlier, Guo warned that if the plans to open a representative office of Taiwan goes ahead, she would leave Estonia, with Kivimägi describing the matter as "serious problem and challenge."

In May 2024, following the meeting of Estonia politician Juku-Kalle Raid, who is also the chairman of the Tibetan support group in Riigikogu, with the 14th Dalai Lama in Dharamshala, India, Guo wrote a letter to Raid stating that the 14th Dalai Lama is a "political exile disguised as a religious figure who has long engaged in anti-China separatist activities" and that "as a responsible politician, a member of the Riigikogu should firmly adhere to international norms, respect China's sovereignty and territorial integrity." In response to Guo's letter, Raid stated in an interview with Postimees that "China occupied Tibet" and that "Estonian citizens are not employees of his embassy or subjects of the communist dictatorship of China." He also stated that "what China cannot do, however, is demand that we should cease any form of interaction with the so-called Tibetan government in exile."

== Personal life ==
She is married and has two sons. She also holds a Master of Laws degree.

Diplomatic posts
Preceded by Li Chao (李超)	Chinese Ambassador to Estonia; 2023–present	Succeeded by Incumbent
Preceded by Yang Xiaorong (杨小茸)	Chinese Ambassador to Madagascar; 2020–2023	Succeeded by Ji Ping (季平)
