= Economic Liberalism and Democratic Action for National Recovery =

Political party in Madagascar

LEADER-Fanilo
- Leader: Heriniaina Mahosindrahaja (alias Babal)
- Founded: June 1992
- Ideology: Economic liberalism Liberal democracy

Economic Liberalism and Democratic Action for National Recovery (Libéralisme Économique et Action Démocratique pour la Reconstruction Nationale, or LEADER-Fanilo) is a political party in Madagascar. The party was founded by Herizo Razafimahaleo in June 1992; since his death in 2008, it had been led by Manassé Esoavelomandroso while four vice-presidents were also chosen to assist him in his work: Jean Max Rakotomamonjy, Benja Razafimahaleo, Constance Razafimily, and Eloi Beandaza. Alain Rakotomavo was chosen as secretary-general.

In 2023 Heriniaina Mahosindrahaja was elected as the president of the party.

After the June 1993 parliamentary election, LEADER-Fanilo joined the government of Prime Minister Francisque Ravony in August, but Razafimahaleo resigned from the government in July 1994 and the other LEADER-Fanilo ministers resigned in May 1995. Razafimahaleo was a candidate in the November 1996 presidential election, placing third with 15.13% of the vote. The party backed Didier Ratsiraka in the second round of the 1996 presidential election, held in December, and after his victory LEADER-Fanilo joined the government again in February 1997. The party won 16 seats in the June 1998 parliamentary election, the second highest number of any party. Razafimahaleo, who had been Deputy Prime Minister, subsequently left the government, although the party continued to participate in it. Razafimahaleo was the party's candidate again in the December 2001 presidential election. He resigned as President of the party in May 2002 and left the political scene.

In the parliamentary election held on 15 December 2002, the party won 3.3% of the popular vote and 2 out of 160 seats.

Razafimahaleo returned to active politics in 2006 and contested the 2006 presidential election as the LEADER-Fanilo candidate, winning 9.03% of the vote. In the September 2007 parliamentary election, the party won one seat: that of Befandriana Nord constituency, won by Jonah Parfait Prezaly.
