= 2001 Malagasy presidential election =

- 16 December 2001
- Turnout: 67.94%
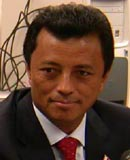

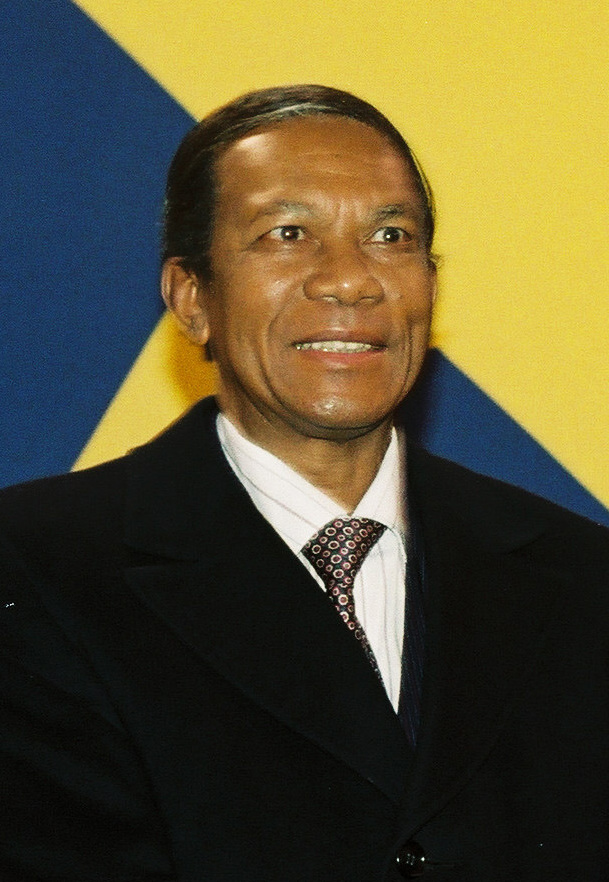
Nominee	Marc Ravalomanana	Didier Ratsiraka
Party	TIM	AREMA
Popular vote	2,306,600	1,609,151
Percentage	51.46%	35.90%
President before election
Didier Ratsiraka
AREMA
Elected President
Marc Ravalomanana
TIM

The 2001 Malagasy presidential election was won by Marc Ravalomanana, who defeated the incumbent President Didier Ratsiraka. The election results were highly contentious, with conflicting reports about the candidates' vote shares and an outbreak of violence between the candidates' supporters. Six months after the election, the High Constitutional Court of Madagascar ruled that Ravalomanana exceeded the 50% threshold and won the presidency without a runoff.

== Main candidates ==
Incumbent president Didier Ratsiraka had been in and out of the office of the presidency before the 2001 elections. He was appointed as president for the first time in 1975, a position he held through 1993. In 1993, Ratsiraka lost re-election to Albert Zafy. Zafy was impeached in 1996, and Ratsiraka won the 1996 election, regaining the presidency. After his return to the presidency, Ratsiraka backed constitutional reforms that reinforced his power and got political allies seated in the Senate and the High Constitutional Court. These actions, along with nepotism in his appointments and allegations of corruption undermined support for his administration.

Marc Ravalomanana, by comparison, was a new face in Malagasy politics. He had been a dairy tycoon and had only entered politics two years earlier, getting elected as mayor of Antananarivo, Madagascar's capital city, in 1999. He took on the role of the main opposition candidate to Ratsiraka after Norbert Ratsirahonana withdrew from the race and endorsed Ravlomanana. Ravalomanana campaigned on economic renewal but also received criticism for not paying taxes.

== Election ==
The election was held on 16 December 2001. The election itself went smoothly, with only minor electoral problems reported, and 67% participation from registered voters. Counting the ballots was much more fractious. All counts agreed that Ravalomanana received the most ballots of any candidate, but it was disputed whether he received an outright majority or merely a plurality. According to the Constitution of Madagascar, if no candidate received 50% of the vote, a second voting round would be held.

=== Counting and the proposed runoff ===
Three different vote counts were undertaken. The first, by the National Electoral Commission, was considered the official governmental count. In this count, Ravalomanana won 46.6% of the vote, meaning that a second vote would be held between Ravalomanana and Ratsiraka. The second, by the National Consortium of Election Observers, gave Ravalomanana a slight majority: 50.5%. A third, by Ravalomanana's election committee, gave him a larger majority: 52.2%.

The High Constitutional Court of Madagascar relied solely on the National Electoral Commission's count. They ruled in January 2002 that Ravalomanana lacked an outright majority and that a second round of elections would decide the winner.

== Protests and resolution ==
=== First recount ===
Ravalomanana had claimed victory shortly after the election. He refused to participate in a runoff, arguing that it would be impossible to trust the results of the runoff given the irregularities in the count from the first round. His demands that the runoff's votes be counted by the High Court with the candidates and international observers present were rejected.

The High Court was slow to ratify the vote count. In mid-January 2002, they requested a recount, to be administered by the National Electoral Commission (CNE). Ravalomanana and his supporters rejected this resolution, arguing that the CNE was controlled by Ratsikraka's government (their initial count was the only one to deny Ravalomanana an outright majority). After the CNE recount returned the same basic result, the High Constitutional Court scheduled the runoff election for 24 February.

=== Protests ===
Ravalomanana's supporters had been protesting in the capital throughout January 2002, and he called for an indefinite general strike on January 28. On February 22, he unilaterally declared himself president. Throughout this process, international organizations, including the United Nations and the Organisation of African Unity (OAU) had been working to broker a deal between the sides. The runoff, originally scheduled for February 24, was postponed while the details of a fair runoff were established.

Clashes between protestors and government forces simmered throughout February and March. Meanwhile, the OAU organized a summit, held in Dakar, Senegal, to lay the groundwork moving forward. The single most consequential development may have been that six of the nine members of the High Constitution Court, appointed by Ratsiraka shortly before the election, had their appointments nullified by the Supreme Court. The previous members of the court returned, and the Supreme Court ordered the HCC to conduct a new recount.

=== Second recount ===
The HCC announced on April 29 that the new recount gave Ravalomanana 51.46% of the votes, meaning that no runoff was needed. The OAU continued to work on a framework for a more satisfying resolution, and Ratsiraka raised legal challenges to the recount; one concern was that four members of the HCC had attended Ravalomanana's first inauguration, raising questions of impartiality. Despite this, international recognition came trickling in for Ravalomanana. The United States and France sent diplomatic envoys to Ravalomanana's second inauguration on May 6.

Although Ratsiraka continued to reject the verdict, the United States recognised Ravalomanana as President in June, and recognition by other countries trickled in afterward. The following month Ratsiraka fled to France, after reports came out that he was organizing mercenaries to militarily support his cause. Ratsiraka's localised military support collapsed, with Ravalomanana's supporters taking over the remaining pro-Ratsiraka bastions without opposition.

== Results ==
Candidate	Party	Original results		Recount	
Candidate	Party	Votes	%	Votes	%
Marc Ravalomanana	Tiako i Madagasikara	1,945,242	46.44	2,306,600	51.46
Didier Ratsiraka	AREMA	1,701,094	40.61	1,609,151	35.90
Albert Zafy	Action, Truth, Development and Harmony	223,831	5.34	229,047	5.11
Herizo Razafimahaleo	LEADER–Fanilo	178,972	4.27	179,293	4.00
Daniel Rajakoba	Independent	74,304	1.77	89,646	2.00
Patrick Rajaonary	Independent	65,571	1.57	68,579	1.53
Total		4,189,014	100.00	4,482,316	100.00
Valid votes		4,189,014	98.41	4,482,316	98.17
Invalid/blank votes		67,494	1.59	83,392	1.83
Total votes		4,256,508	100.00	4,565,708	100.00
Registered voters/turnout		6,367,610	66.85	6,720,218	67.94
Source: African Elections Database, Rochel
