= Minister of Economy and Finance (Madagascar) =

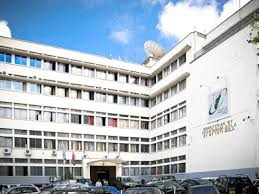
Ministry of Economy and Finance in Antananarivo

Minister of Economy and Finance is the person in charge of the Ministry of Economy and Finance of Madagascar.

== List of ministers ==
- Paul Longuet, October 1960–January 1963
- Victor Miadana, January 1963–May 1972
- Albert Marie Ramaroson, May 1972–February 1975
- Désiré Rakotoarijaona, February 1975–June 1975
- Rakotovao Razakaboana, June 1975–January 1982
- Pascal Rakotomavo, January 1982–1989
- Léon Rajaobelina, 1989–March 1992
- Gérard Rabehevitra, March 1992–May 1992
- Evariste Marson, May 1992–October 1993
- José Yvon Raserijaona, October 1993–February 1997
- Tantely Andrianarivo, February 1997–July 1998
- Tantely Andrianarivo, August 1998–February 2002
- Benjamin Andriamparany Radavidson, February 2002–October 2007
- Haja Nirina Razafinjatovo, October 2007–March 2009
- Benja Razafimahaleo, March 2009–September 2009
- Hery Rajaonarimampianina, 2009–2013
- Lantoniaina Rasoloelison, 2013–2014
- Jean Razafindravonona, 2014–2015
- Gervais Rakotoarimanana, 2015–2017
- Vonintsalama Andriambololona, 2017–2019
- Richard Randriamandrato, 2019–2021
- Rindra Rabarinirinarison, 2021–2025
- Herinjatovo Aimé Ramiarison, 2025–Incumbent

== See also ==
- Government of Madagascar
- Economy of Madagascar
