= Albert Zafy =

President of Madagascar from 1993 to 1996

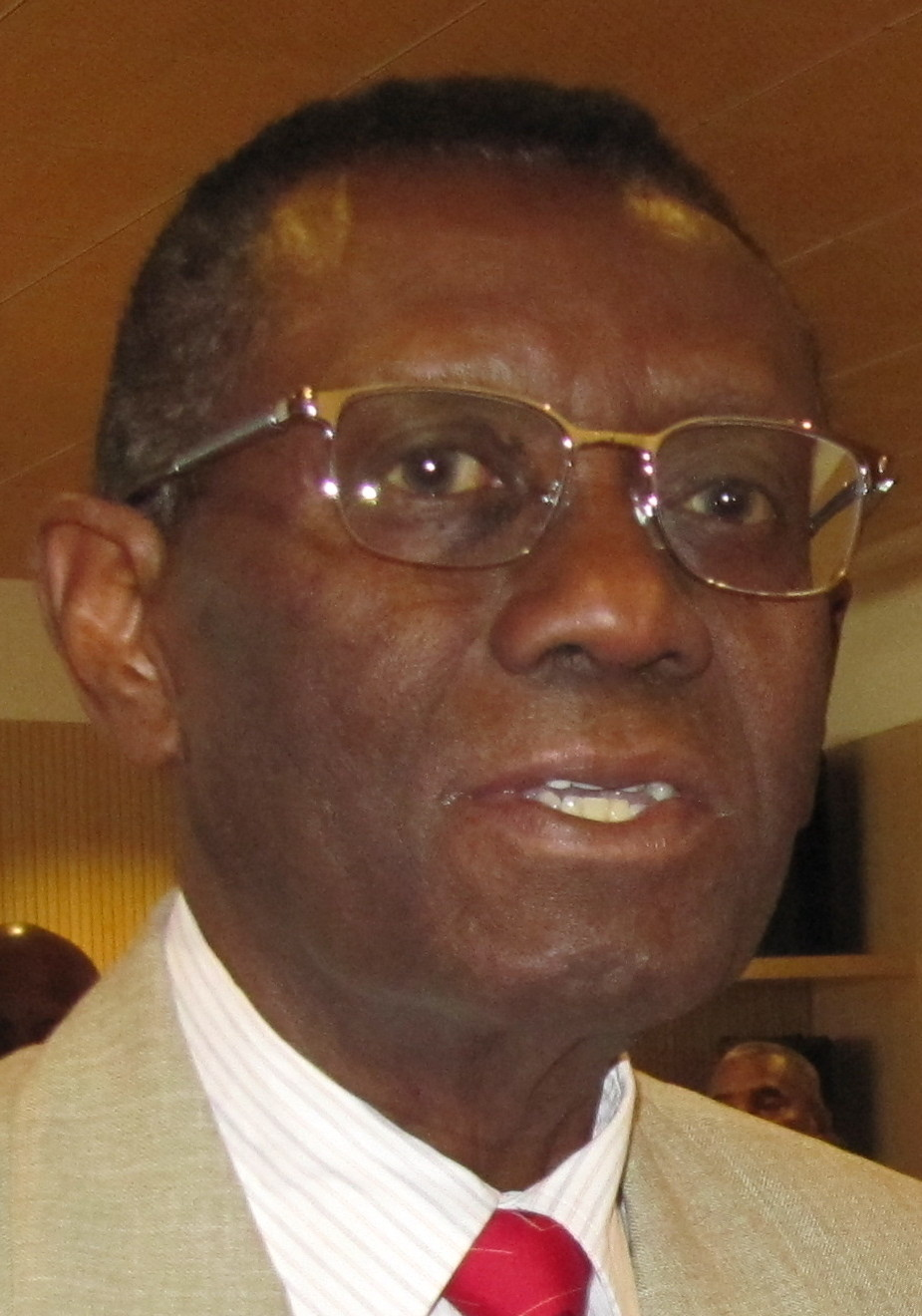
- Zafy in 2013

4th President of Madagascar
- In office 27 March 1993 – 5 September 1996
- Prime Minister: Guy Razanamasy; Francisque Ravony; Emmanuel Rakotovahiny
- Preceded by: Didier Ratsiraka
- Succeeded by: Norbert Ratsirahonana (acting)

Personal details
- Born: 1 May 1927 Betsihaka, Antsiranana Province, French Madagascar
- Died: 13 October 2017 (aged 90) Saint-Pierre, Réunion
- Party: National Reconciliation Committee (NRC) (2002–2017)
- Other political affiliations: National Union for Democracy and Development (UNDD) (before 2002)
- Spouse: Thérèse Zafy
- Children: 3
- Education: University of Montpellier

Albert Zafy (1 May 1927 – 13 October 2017) was a Malagasy politician and educator who served as the fourth president of Madagascar from 1993 to 1996. In 1988, he founded the National Union for Democracy and Development (UNDD).

In 1992, Zafy stood as a presidential candidate against President Didier Ratsiraka. The election soon became a run-off between the two candidates. In 1993, Zafy won the run-off election in a landslide, receiving 67% of the vote. During his presidency, Zafy received poor polling numbers due to an economic decline with accusations of corruption in his office. He was impeached in 1996 and then defeated by Ratsiraka in the 1996 presidential election. After leaving office, Zafy remained active in politics as an opposition leader under successive administrations.

== Early life and early career ==
Zafy was born in Ambilobe, Diana Region on 1 May 1927. He studied at the University of Montpellier in France.

He married Thérèse Zafy during the 1960s in a traditional Antankarana wedding ceremony. The couple had three children - Aimé Zafy, Sylvie Zafy, and Richard "Titus" Zafy.

After his return to Madagascar he became Minister of Public Health and Social Affairs under Gabriel Ramanantsoa. After Didier Ratsiraka took power in 1975, Zafy resigned from the government and joined the University of Madagascar.

== Early political career ==
=== Opposition leader in the early 1990s ===
In 1988 he founded the National Union for Democracy and Development (UNDD). At a national conference of the opposition in 1990, Zafy was elected as President of the Committee of Active Forces (CFV), a cooperation group of several opposition parties, including Zafy's UNDD. On 16 July 1991, the CFV declared the creation of an alternative government, with Zafy as its Prime Minister. Zafy was detained for a week in late July 1991 and was met with a crowd of about 100,000 supporters upon his release. He was subsequently wounded during a protest. The opposition was ultimately successful in forcing Ratsiraka to agree to the Panorama Convention, which established a transitional government and stripped Ratsiraka of most of his powers, on 31 October 1991. Zafy oversaw the transition as head of the High Authority of the State, which, along with the Social and Economic Recovery Council, replaced the Supreme Revolutionary Council and the National Assembly during the 1991–1993 transitional period.

== First Presidential run ==
In the multiparty presidential election held in November 1992, Zafy came first in the first round with about 45% of the vote; Ratsiraka placed second with about 29%. In the second round, held on 10 February 1993, Zafy won the presidency with 66.74% of the vote. He took office in late March–the first time since Madagascar's independence in 1960 that an incumbent president peacefully transferred power to an elected member of the opposition. In June 1993, Zafy's supporters won a majority in parliamentary elections.

== Presidency (1991–1996) ==
=== Tenure ===
In office, Zafy's rivalry with Prime Minister Francisque Ravony led him to seek increased powers, and in September 1995 a successful referendum was held that substantially increased the powers of the president. This gave him authority over the selection of the prime minister, a decision that was previously in the hands of the National Assembly; following the referendum, the National Assembly was required to send three names of candidates to the president, from which he could choose.

The president also gained the ability to dismiss the prime minister without requiring new elections. Ravony resigned in October 1995, and Zafy appointed Emmanuel Rakotovahiny, who was the head of the UNDD and had been Minister of State for Rural Development and Land Reform, in his place.

Zafy's time in office was widely seen as being marked by economic decline, which negatively impacted his popularity, and amid accusations of corruption and abuse of power, he was impeached by the National Assembly on 26 July 1996. The impeachment was backed by more than the necessary two-thirds majority; out of 134 deputies present, 99 voted in favor of the motion, 32 against it, and there were three null votes. On 4 September, the High Constitutional Court upheld the impeachment. On 5 September, Zafy announced that he would leave office on 10 October, and he described his impeachment as a "constitutional coup d'état" that occurred as a result of his criticism of the National Assembly. Although he could not delay his departure from office, he was able to stand as a candidate in the late 1996 presidential election called as a result of his impeachment.

=== 1996 re-election bid and defeat ===
In his 1996 campaign, Zafy blamed the problems faced by Madagascar during his presidency on his opponents and the International Monetary Fund, and he downplayed the charges against him that had led to his impeachment. Although he had lost much of his support, in the first round of the election, held on 3 November, he was able to take second place with 23.39% of the vote, behind Ratsiraka's 36.61%. Zafy received some support in the second round from those who, despite their criticisms of Zafy, felt he was preferable to Ratsiraka, such as Interim President Norbert Ratsirahonana, who had unsuccessfully stood as a candidate in the first round. In the second round, held on 29 December, Zafy narrowly lost to Ratsiraka, taking 49.29% of the vote and losing by about 45,000 votes. He later alleged that the High Constitutional Court had switched the numbers for himself and Ratsiraka and said that he had not spoken of that at the time for the sake of peace.

== Post-presidency (1997–2017) ==
=== Opposition leader under Ratsiraka ===
Zafy led an attempt to impeach Ratsiraka in early 1998, accusing him of various charges, including perjury and nepotism; he also accused Ratsiraka of violating the constitution in his moves toward decentralization and the strengthening of the presidency at the expense of the National Assembly's power. The impeachment motion failed in the National Assembly on 4 February 1998 when only 60 deputies voted in favor of it, well short of the necessary 92. Zafy subsequently won a seat in the May 1998 parliamentary election, becoming the oldest deputy in the National Assembly. He also unsuccessfully sought the secession of Antsiranana Province from Madagascar at around the same time.

On 31 August 2001, Zafy announced that he would again run in the December 2001 presidential election. On that occasion, he placed a distant third with about 5% of the vote. Opposition candidate Marc Ravalomanana prevailed in an extended dispute with Ratsiraka over the election results, and Ratsiraka fled into exile.

=== Opposition leader under Ravalomanana ===
Zafy became the leader of the National Reconciliation Committee (CRN), which was founded in June 2002 to promote national reconciliation among the leading participants in the political crisis that followed the 2001 election. During Ravalomanana's presidency, Zafy and the CRN were viewed as part of the radical opposition in Madagascar. Zafy strongly criticized Ravalomanana and called for a new constitution. A grenade exploded outside Zafy's home early on 8 July 2004, causing some damage but no injuries. This occurred in the midst of a series of grenade attacks across the country.

On 8 December 2006, Zafy's property was raided by police as part of the government's investigation regarding General Fidy, who allegedly attempted a coup in November, and presidential candidate Pety Rakotoniaina, both of whom the police sought to locate and arrest. Reacting to the raid, Zafy said that he did not recognize Ravalomanana as president and had never recognized him as such. Zafy travelled to Paris in June 2007, where he met with Ratsiraka and members of his former government who were also in exile. He met with Ratsiraka on 8 June, with AREMA leader Pierrot Rajaonarivelo on 9 June, and with Tantely Andrianarivo, who served as Prime Minister under Ratsiraka, on 11 June. He met with Ratsiraka and Andrianarivo again on 25 June.

=== Role in 2009–2010 political events ===
President Ravalomanana was forced out of office through popular protests and military intervention in March 2009; opposition leader Andry Rajoelina assumed the presidency with support from the military. Rajoelina included Zafy's adviser Betiana Bruno as one of 44 members of the High Transitional Authority, which he appointed on 31 March 2009. Zafy expressed his objections to the transitional government at a press conference on 1 April, complaining that Rajoelina would not take his advice; he also said that he would seek provincial autonomy. Bruno was nevertheless present at the national conference which began on 2 April and was promoted by Rajoelina's government.

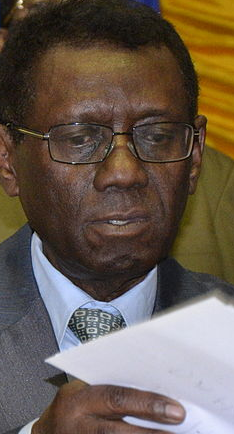
Zafy in September 2012

On 4 August 2009, as part of negotiations for a solution to the political crisis, Zafy met with Rajoelina, Ravalomanana, and Ratsiraka, along with former Mozambican President Joaquim Chissano, who acted as mediator at the four-day-long mediation crisis talks held in Maputo. An extended process of negotiations between the four leaders resulted in a power-sharing agreement, but by December 2009 that agreement had effectively collapsed. Rajoelina's government initially barred Zafy and others from returning to Madagascar after the talks, but later he was allowed to return. In the wake of the power-sharing agreement's collapse, Zafy declared on 18 December 2009, that the opposition would form its own government of national unity. He denounced Rajoelina, saying that Rajoelina had "reneged on his signature" and that the opposition could "no longer trust him to run the country". He also called on the army to refrain from involvement in the political situation.

=== Personal life and death ===
Zafy died of a stroke on 13 October 2017 at a hospital in Saint-Pierre in the French overseas department of Réunion at the age of 90.

Political offices
Preceded by Didier Ratsiraka	President of Madagascar; 1991–1996	Succeeded by Norbert Ratsirahonana
