= List of ambassadors of China to Estonia =

The ambassador of China to Estonia is the official representative of the People's Republic of China to Estonia.

== List of representatives ==
Name (English)	Name (Chinese)	Tenure begins	Tenure ends	Note
Qiao Zonghuai	乔宗淮	October 1991	March 1993	
Sun Dadong	孙大栋	December 1992	June 1998	
Zou Mingrong	邹明榕	December 1997	November 2001	
Cong Jun	丛军	June 2001	September 2003	
Hong Jiuyin	宏九印	June 2003	April 2006	
Xie Junping	谢俊平	December 2005	June 2008	
Huang Zhongpo	黄忠坡	February 2008	April 2012	
Qu Zhe	曲喆	June 2011	January 2018	
Li Chao	李超	November 2017	October 2022	
Guo Xiaomei	郭晓梅	October 2023		
