= Victor Ramahatra =

Malagasy politician

12th Prime Minister of Madagascar
- In office 12 February 1988 – 8 August 1991
- President: Didier Ratsiraka
- Preceded by: Désiré Rakotoarijaona
- Succeeded by: Guy Razanamasy

Personal details
- Born: 6 September 1945 (age 81) Antananarivo, French Madagascar (Now Madagascar)
- Party: Military

Victor Ramahatra (born 6 September 1945) is a former politician in Madagascar. He was born in Antananarivo. During the presidency of Didier Ratsiraka, Ramahatra served as Prime Minister of Madagascar from 12 February 1988 until 8 August 1991, replacing long-time prime minister Désiré Rakotoarijaona. When Ratsiraka returned to office in 1997, Ramahatra became a special military adviser to him. In June 2002 Ramahatra was charged with treason and imprisoned for alleged involvement in a plot to assassinate President Marc Ravalomanana. He was released in October 2002.

Political offices
Preceded by Désiré Rakotoarijaona	Prime Minister of Madagascar; 1988–1991	Succeeded by Guy Razanamasy
