= Sennen Andriamirado =

Malagasy journalist (1945–1997)

Sennen Andriamirado (1945 – July 15, 1997) was a Malagasy journalist. He was associated with the magazine Jeune Afrique for eighteen years and served as one of its four editors-in-chief. He is best known for his biographies of Thomas Sankara, the revolutionary leader of Burkina Faso from 1983 to 1987.

== Bibliography ==
- Il s'appelait Sankara, Jeune Afrique Livres, 1987
- Sankara, le rebelle, 1987, Jeune Afrique Livres, 1989
- Le Mali aujourd'hui, Jaguar, 1998, 2003
- Madagascar, Jaguar, 2004

== Notes and references ==
This article was originally translated from the French Wikipedia article fr:Sennen Andriamirado.
