= Pascal Rakotomavo =

Malagasy politician

17th Prime Minister of Madagascar
- In office 21 February 1997 – 23 July 1998
- President: Didier Ratsiraka
- Preceded by: Norbert Ratsirahonana
- Succeeded by: Tantely Andrianarivo

Personal details
- Born: Pascal Joseph Rakotomavo; 1 April 1934; Antananarivo, French Madagascar
- Died: 14 December 2010 (aged 76); Réunion, France
- Political party: AREMA

Pascal Joseph Rakotomavo (1 April 1934 – 14 December 2010) was a Malagasy politician. He was the Prime Minister of Madagascar from 21 February 1997 to 23 July 1998.

== Life and career ==
Born in Antananarivo, Rakotomavo was Minister of Economy and Finance from 1982 to 1989, and Special Adviser to President Didier Ratsiraka from 1989 to 1993. His appointment as Prime Minister in February 1997, following Ratsiraka's return to the presidency, was considered surprising. Rakotomavo served as Governor of Antananarivo Province from June 2001 to 2002. He was also Ratsiraka's campaign director in the December 2001 presidential election, but in the political crisis that followed between Ratsiraka and opposition candidate Marc Ravalomanana, as governor he adopted what has been described as a neutral position. On 28 February 2002, Ratsiraka appointed General Léon-Claude Raveloarison as military governor of Antananarivo Province under martial law. Rakotomavo was the only one of the six provincial governors to not sign a declaration that Toamasina, Ratsiraka's stronghold during the 2002 political crisis, was the nation's provisional capital. After Ravalomanana prevailed in the dispute, Rakotomavo, unlike the governors of the other provinces, was not prosecuted.

Political offices
Preceded by Norbert Ratsirahonana	Prime Minister of Madagascar; 1997-1998	Succeeded by Tantely Andrianarivo
