= Désiré Rakotoarijaona =

Malagasy politician (born 1934)

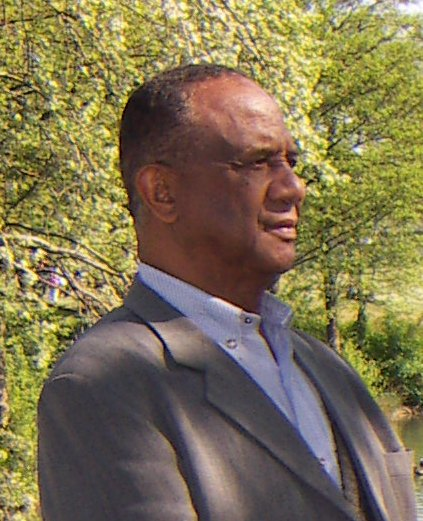
- Rakotoarijaona in 2004

11th Prime Minister of Madagascar
- In office August 1, 1977 – February 12, 1988
- President: Didier Ratsiraka
- Preceded by: Justin Rakotoniaina
- Succeeded by: Victor Ramahatra

Personal details
- Born: 19 June 1934 (age 91) Tananarive, French Madagascar
- Profession: Military officer

Désiré Rakotoarijaona (born 19 June 1934) is a Malagasy politician. He was Minister of Economy and Finance from February 1975 to June 1975. He was Prime Minister of Madagascar from 1 August 1977 to 12 February 1988, under President Didier Ratsiraka. Rakotoarijaona was replaced by Victor Ramahatra. Rakotoarijaona also ran in the November 1996 presidential election but finished in last place out of 15 candidates with 0.37% of the vote.

Political offices
| Preceded by Justin Rakotoniaina | Prime Minister of Madagascar; 1977–1988 | Succeeded by Victor Ramahatra |
