= Francisque Ravony =

Malagasy politician (1942–2003)

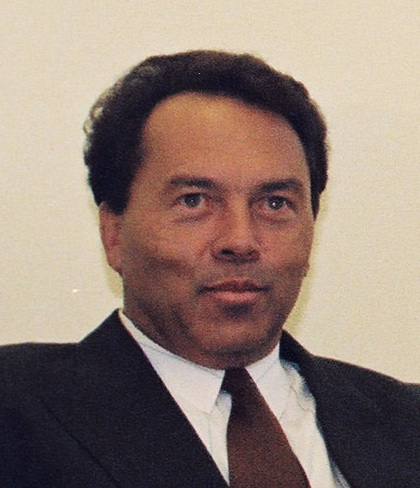
- Ravony in 1994

14th Prime Minister of Madagascar
- In office 9 August 1993 – 30 October 1995
- President: Albert Zafy
- Preceded by: Guy Razanamasy
- Succeeded by: Emmanuel Rakotovahiny

Personal details
- Born: Francisque Tsiatosika Ravony; 2 December 1942 Vohipeno, French Madagascar
- Died: 15 February 2003 (aged 60) Soavinandriana, Madagascar
- Party: Committee for Support of Democracy and Development in Madagascar
- Education: College of Saint Michael, Amparibe

Francisque Tsiatosika Ravony (2 December 1942 – 15 February 2003) was a Malagasy lawyer and politician. He was a key political figure in Madagascar during the late 1980s and 1990s. He was Prime Minister of Madagascar from 1993 to 1995 under President Albert Zafy.

Ravony was elected as Prime Minister through a vote of the National Assembly on 9 August 1993. He received 55 votes, while Roger Ralison and Manandafy Rakotonirina respectively received 46 votes and 32 votes.

Political offices
Preceded by Guy Razanamasy	Prime Minister of Madagascar; 1993-1995	Succeeded by Emmanuel Rakotovahiny
