= 2009 Malagasy political crisis =

2009 political crisis in Madagascar

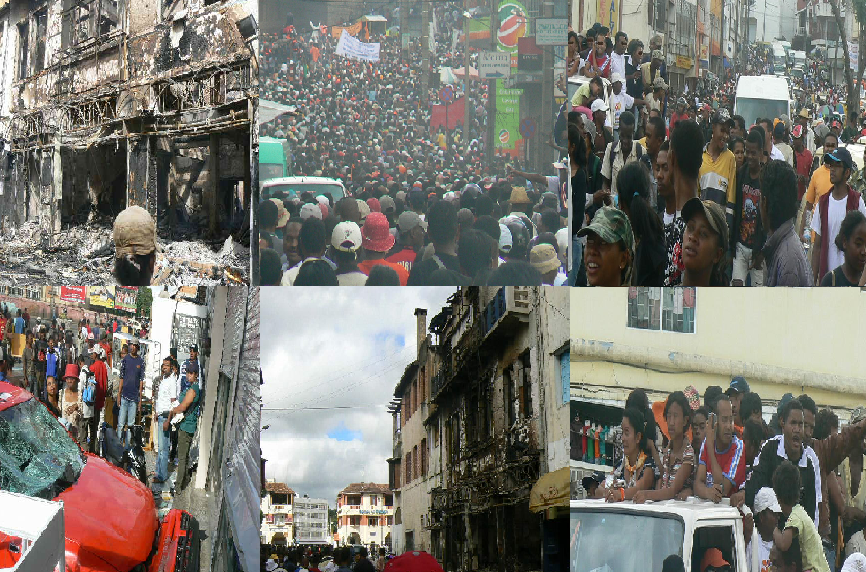
- Protests in Madagascar, January 2009
Date	26 January – 7 November 2009 (9 months, 1 week and 5 days)
Location	Madagascar
Result	Resignation of President Ravalomanana; Installation of Antananarivo mayor Andry Rajoelina as President of the "High Transitional Authority of Madagascar" after a coup d'état; End of the Third Republic of Madagascar

Belligerents
Government of Madagascar	High Transitional Authority; Political opposition

Commanders and leaders
Marc Ravalomanana; Charles Rabemananjara; Manandafy Rakotonirina	Andry Rajoelina; Colonel Noël Rakotonandrasana; Vice Admiral Hyppolite Ramaroson; Monja Roindefo

Casualties and losses
- 135 killed

The 2009 Malagasy political crisis began on 26 January 2009 with the political opposition movement led by Antananarivo mayor Andry Rajoelina, which sought to oust President Marc Ravalomanana from the presidency. The crisis reached its climax in the 2009 Malagasy coup d'état led by Colonel Noël Rakotonandrasana when Andry Rajoelina was declared the president of the High Transitional Authority of Madagascar on 21 March 2009, five days after Ravalomanana transferred his power to a military council and fled to South Africa.

The international community immediately condemned the leader and his ascension as unconstitutional, characterising the move as a coup. Financial support and foreign investments stopped, and the country fell into one of the worst economic crises in its history. The SADC and the African Union were designated to supervise Madagascar's political reinstatement.

Though the objective of the transitional government was to run presidential elections as soon as possible to relieve the tensions (despite regular delays), its major challenge was to establish an agreement among Madagascar's four key political factions (Rajoelina, Ravalomanana, Zafy and Ratsiraka), some of which were skeptical of the transitional government. On 11 December 2010, a new constitution was formally approved, launching the Fourth Republic. On 28 October 2011 a consensus Prime Minister, Omer Beriziky, was appointed. Presidential and parliamentary elections were scheduled for 8 May and 3 July 2013 and eventually held in December.

== Origins of the conflict ==
Map of Madagascar in Africa

In December 2007, Andry Rajoelina was elected mayor of Antananarivo. Tensions quickly grew between president Ravalomanana and the young mayor over the course of 2008 as Rajoelina became a vocal critic of a series of unpopular policies enacted by the president. He condemned what he called the "restriction of freedom" on the island, and criticized the president's plans to lease large parts of land to the South Korean industrial company Daewoo.

On 13 December 2008, the Ravalomanana administration decided to shutter Viva TV, a television channel belonging to Rajoelina after broadcasting an interview with the former exiled president Didier Ratsiraka. Other television and radio stations that also aired the interview were not sanctioned.

Andry Rajoelina organized a series of rallies in January 2009 that took aim at the Ravalomanana administration and gave voice to growing popular resentment toward the president's increasingly authoritarian policies and a widespread perception that national development had only benefitted an elite minority of which the president was the most visible figurehead. As anti-government frustration transformed into civil unrest, two state television stations were burned by anti-government protesters. At least 130 people were killed in Madagascar during the crisis. The protests were seen as the gravest challenge faced by the Ravalomanana government since he came to office in 2002. President Ravalomanana vowed to restore order "whatever the cost", according to a government statement.

== Protests ==
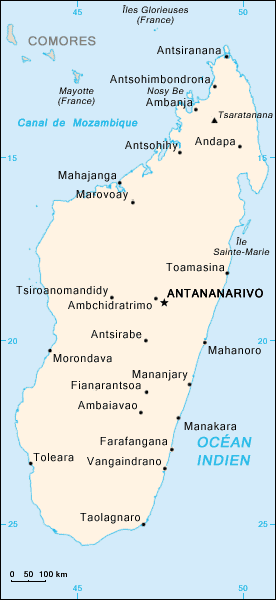
The protests took place in Antananarivo, the capital and largest city in Madagascar.

Rajoelina called a general strike during the weekend of 24–25 January 2009, in the capital city, Antananarivo, against Ravalomanana, whom he has called a dictator. Ravalomanana, who was in South Africa, cut short his trip to a regional summit in Pretoria, and flew back to Madagascar. In a statement Ravalomanana accused the mayor of attempting a coup saying, "The call for revolt and civil disobedience... corresponds to a coup d'état...tramples on the values of the constitution and the republic's institutions."

On 26 January 2009, the protests turned increasingly violent. Demonstrators set fire to the Madagascar state-owned radio building, attacked a private television station owned by Ravalomanana and looted shops and businesses throughout the city. That same day, armed government security agents reportedly disabled the transmitter of Viva Radio, a private radio station owned by Rajoelina.

Protesters ransacked two pro-government television stations in Antananarivo. Thousands of protesters raided and looted the headquarters of the Radio Nationale Malgache and Télévision Nationale Malgache building around 1 pm local time on 26 January 2009. About an hour later demonstrators burned down the Malagasy Broadcasting System, a private station owned by President Ravalomanana. A policeman and a fourteen-year-old protester were reportedly killed in the clashes at the Malagasy Broadcasting System attacks.

Firefighters found the bodies of at least 25 people in the ruins of a burned out, looted department store in downtown Antananarivo. The bodies were thought to be those of looters who became trapped in the burning shop when the roof caved in. In total, 44 people died. Their bodies were taken to a morgue, and all but ten of them were found to be severely burned.

In a show of defiance against the government, Rajoelina called for all Antananarivo residents to stay home on 29 January 2009. This "ghost town" (ville morte) protest basically closed all stores and businesses in the capital city.

The Roman Catholic Cardinal emeritus of Antananarivo Armand Razafindratandra appealed for calm as the protests spread outside of the capital. All state and private radio stations in the country reportedly ceased broadcasting, with the exception of Radio Don Bosco, which is run by the Salesian religious institute.

Rajoelina said on 31 January that he was taking control of the country due to the failure of Ravalomanana and the government to fulfil their responsibilities. He said that a request for Ravalomanana's "immediate resignation" would be submitted to Parliament "in order to comply with the legal procedure". Furthermore, he asked that the central bank withhold money from the government, that all government ministries close, and that the security forces join him. Rajoelina said that he wanted the constitution to be respected and that it was Ravalomanana who had violated the constitution. According to Rajoelina, a new transitional government would soon be appointed under his leadership and a new presidential election would be held within two years. Speaking on the same day, Ravalomanana stated that he was "still the president of this country" and that he would "do what is necessary to develop this nation".

The African Union (AU) immediately warned Rajoelina that it would not accept an unconstitutional power grab in Madagascar: "It's totally forbidden to take power by non-constitutional means."

Opposition leaders allied to Rajoelina filed a petition with the High Constitutional Court on 2 February, asking it to remove Ravalomanana from office. By that point, attendance at Rajoelina's rallies had reportedly decreased. On 3 February, Rajoelina said at a rally that he would announce his new government on 7 February. On the same day, the High Constitutional Court ruled that it had no power to remove the President from office, as that power belonged to Parliament. Also on 3 February, Rajoelina was dismissed as Mayor and a special delegation, headed by Guy Randrianarisoa, was appointed instead. Rajoelina denounced the decision, saying that there was "no valid reason" for it and that he was prepared to face arrest if necessary; he warned that the city would "not accept this decision".

Rajoelina held another rally on 4 February, with about 1,500 people in attendance. On that occasion he described the appointment of Randrianarisoa as "an insult to the people of Madagascar"; he instead designated Michele Ratsivalaka to succeed him as Mayor and gave her his mayoral scarf.

=== Shooting at opposition rally ===
On 7 February, an opposition rally was held with twenty-thousand in attendance. The demonstrators marched towards Ambohitsorohitra Palace and crossed the "ligne rouge" (red line), the perimeter line around the palace gates that demarcates the zone off-limits to the public. The palace guards responded by firing live ammunition to disperse the crowd. Initial reports counted 83 wounded and 28 people killed, including a local reporter. Some looting was reported afterward. Ambulances took the wounded to hospitals or private clinics, and bodies were seen piled up on the streets before they were taken to the morgue. The National Police warned that the death toll could rise, as many of the wounded were in critical condition. The following day it was reported that the death toll had increased to at least 50, with doctors estimating that 180 people had arrived at the city's main Ravoahangy Andrianavalona Hospital. Antananarivo journalist Fanja Saholiarisoa said: "The mortuary is full and the hospital is full. On TV there is a special announcement calling on people who have cars to come and pick up the injured people from the hospitals". This brought the number of people killed since the start of the political violence to 130, with 80 people killed before the shooting of the demonstrators, including the people who died in the burned department store.

Also on 7 February, Rajoelina said that Roindefo Monja would be prime minister under his transitional authority. According to Rajoelina, each of Madagascar's regions would have representation in the transitional authority. Regarding Ambohitsorohitra Palace, Rajoelina alluded to its history as a mayoral residence prior to 2002 and said that it "belongs to the people and to the city", while declaring that he had decided to give the palace to Monja for his use as prime minister. On the same day, Ravalomanana urged "calm and order", accusing Rajoelina of "cross[ing] all limits", while Prime Minister Charles Rabemananjara announced a one-week extension of the curfew.

While visiting hospitalized victims of the shooting on 8 February, Rajoelina vowed to continue his struggle and argued that Ravalomanana's answer to the popular call for change was gunfire. He called for a national day of mourning on 9 February.

On 9 February, Defence Minister Cécile Manorohanta announced her resignation, saying, "After all that has happened, I decide as of now to no longer remain part of this government." Chief of military staff Mamy Ranaivoniarivo was appointed to replace Manorohanta on the same day.

7 February shooting was thought to have reversed the opposition's declining momentum. Newspapers published on 9 February, strongly denounced the shooting. On 10 February, speaking before a rally of about 5,000 supporters, Rajoelina urged the people to observe a general strike on the next day; he asked that everyone stay indoors and that no one go to work or attend school. Roindefo announced the appointment of four ministers to serve in his transitional government, and he said that the remainder of them would be appointed by the end of the week. Meanwhile, both Ravalomanana and Rajoelina accepted dialogue in principle; Rajoelina said that dialogue would be conditional on the holding of a new presidential election or the formation of a transitional government.

At a 35,000-strong rally in Antananarivo on 14 February, Ravalomanana said that he would serve out his full term as president, that he was listening to the people, and that he regretted the deaths that had occurred during the protests. On the same day, Rajoelina held a rally nearby, with about 10,000 in attendance.

At a rally on 17 February, Rajoelina vowed to continue the struggle, and later in the day several thousand of his supporters engaged in sit-ins near key ministries. Representing the government, Defense Minister Ranaivoniarivo invited Roindefo to participate in talks. Rajoelina's supporters took over several important ministries on 19 February, changing the locks and installing Rajoelina's own ministers to work in them. Meanwhile, Ravalomanana appointed a new Minister of the Interior, Rabenja Sehenoarisoa (who had previously served as chief of police in the capital). His predecessor as Interior Minister, Gervais Rakotonirina, was said to have departed the government due to poor health. Only hours after the opposition took over the government ministries, they were removed from the ministries by security forces early on 20 February; about 50 of Rajoelina's supporters were arrested.

Ravalomanana and Rajoelina met on 21 February; this meeting, which lasted about 45 minutes, was organized by the Council of Christian Churches in Madagascar. Both Ravalomanana and Rajoelina agreed to five points intended to calm the situation. This was intended as a prelude to more comprehensive dialogue. On 23 February the two met again for about an hour, and they held a third meeting, also lasting an hour, on 24 February. However, Ravalomanana failed to appear for a planned meeting on 25 February, and Rajoelina then announced that he was withdrawing from the talks. Rajoelina criticized Ravalomanana for his absence and furthermore stated that the meetings he had held with Ravalomanana prior to that were disappointing. Odon Razanakolona, who had been mediating the talks, abandoned his role shortly before Rajoelina withdrew from the talks; according to Razanakolona, the talks were fruitless and deadlocked.

=== Post-talks ===
A protest in Antananarivo was broken up by the security forces on 26 February. Another protest in Fianarantsoa on 27 February, was also broken up; two deaths and 13 serious injuries were reported in the latter incident. At a 10,000-strong rally in Antananarivo on 28 February, Rajoelina vowed to continue his struggle "until we end this dictatorship". He said that, beginning on 2 March, protests would be held in the 13 May Plaza on a daily basis; he also called for the army to support him.

A protest in Ambositra was broken up by police on 4 March, and two people were killed. Also on 4 March, President Ravalomanana declared his intention to "restore order" on Radio Mada. In Antananarivo, police blocked roads on 5 March to prevent protests in the 13 May Plaza.

The security forces unsuccessfully attempted to arrest Rajoelina at his compound late on 5 March; they also raided his Viva media network. Initially they surrounded Viva, and after 30 minutes the staff attempted to evacuate equipment, at which point the security forces stormed the building and confiscated equipment. Rajoelina told Agence France-Presse on 7 March that he was "now hiding in a safe location where I cannot be attacked"; it was later acknowledged that he had gone to the residence of the French ambassador on 6 March.

=== Mutiny and military leadership change ===
Soldiers at a military base in Soanierana district, near Antananarivo, mutinied on 8 March; they objected to the use of force against the opposition. United Nations envoy Tiebilé Dramé said on 9 March that the UN was placing Rajoelina "under its protection in a diplomatic residence". The French Foreign Ministry said on 10 March that Rajoelina had left the French ambassador's residence.

On 10 March, the chief of staff of the Malagasy army, General Edmond Rasolomahandry, gave political leaders 72 hours to solve the country's problems and return peace, threatening to take over if this did not occur. The same day, Defence Minister Ranaivoniarivo announced his resignation shortly after a number of army officers visited his office to threaten a switch of allegiances to Rajoelina. On 11 March, pro-opposition soldiers from the CAPSAT (Army Corps of Personnel and Administrative and Technical Services) stormed the army headquarters and forced Edmond Rasolomahandry to resign. Analysts stated that civil war seemed a distinct possibility. Andre Andriarijaona replaced Rasolomahandry, apparently as a result of internal army deliberations and not a presidential appointment, and Andriarijaona said that the military would remain neutral and not seize power, thus revoking the 72-hour ultimatum. A spokesman for Rajoelina said on 11 March that Rajoelina would not participate in talks planned to begin the next day; subsequently the Christian Council of Churches announced that the talks would be delayed.

On 12 March, the opposition took over the Ministry of Finance and Budget with the support of the armed forces while the president's prime minister held a ten-minute meeting with the opposition-designated prime minister, who later stated that Rabemananjara had agreed to give up his job to him. The next day, the chief of the military police stated he was taking orders from Andre Andriarijaona and not from the general appointed by Ravalomanana; this was followed by the sending of army tanks against the Iavoloha Palace of the president, while some 3,000–5,000 civilian supporters of Ravalomanana surrounded the palace to counter opposition protests further away from the area. The Ravalomanana supporters, however, were told to clear the road in case the army neared the area.

On 14 March, Monja occupied the prime minister's office while the opposition forces controlled the building. Monja announced that the opposition forces, called the High Authority of Transition, "is presiding over the destiny of Madagascar". Rajoelina gave the president four hours, until 6 pm (1500 GMT), to voluntarily resign, after which a mass civilian march would take place on the presidential palace to put Ravalomanana out of office; he explicitly ruled out a violent overthrow through military means. However, Ravalomanana later emerged from the guarded palace after the deadline had passed, asserting that he was still the legal president and calling for a national conference.

On 15 March, Ravalomanana offered to hold a referendum on whether he should stay in power or not, which was seen as a sign of the intense pressure placed on his presidency. The following day, Rajoelina rejected this proposal and called on the security forces to arrest Ravalomanana.

== Coup d'etat and Ravalomanana's resignation ==
On 16 March 2009, one of the palaces of President Ravalomanana, the Ambohitsorohitra Palace, was stormed and taken by soldiers of the Malagasy Army. Reports also indicate the capture of the country's central bank. The president was not in the stormed palace at the time. The African Union condemned the action, calling it an "attempted coup d'état". The actions followed an earlier call from opposition leader Andry Rajoelina for the President's arrest; Rajoelina insisted that the palace seizure was not a coup, although he immediately installed himself in the presidential offices of the captured palace.

Hours later, the BBC stated that Ravalomanana was to resign and hand over the powers of both the president and prime minister to a military board headed by Vice Admiral Hyppolite Ramaroson. Ravalomanana later said, "I never resigned. I was forced to hand power over, at gun point, on March the 17th." At the time, Ravalomanana had already moved out of the Iavoloha Palace to an undisclosed location; as of 24 March, he was reportedly in Swaziland. The opposition movement planned to organize elections within 24 months and rewrite the constitution to establish a "Fourth Republic". However, Vice Admiral Ramaroson announced later in the day on 17 March that the military junta would transfer power directly to Rajoelina, making him president of the opposition-dominated High Transitional Authority that he had appointed weeks earlier. With the military's backing, the authority was charged with taking up the task previously accorded to Ravalomanana's proposed military directorate. Madagascar's constitutional court deemed the transfer of power, from Ravalomanana to the military board and then to Rajoelina, to be legal. The court's statement did not include any justifications for its decision.

Rajoelina said that Ravalomanana should be prosecuted for allegedly using lethal force against unarmed opposition demonstrators earlier in the year. Rajoelina is prohibiting Ravalomanana's ministers from leaving the country.

On 19 March, Rajoelina suspended both chambers of Parliament. Roindefo responded to international criticism on 20 March, saying that the government will "explain the real situation. Maybe the way Madagascar acts is not very clear. Things can be a bit specific which may be difficult to follow in every detail." According to Roindefo, the transfer of power was not a coup d'état but instead "the direct expression of democracy, when representative democracy does not express itself through the institutions". Rajoelina was sworn in as President on 21 March before a crowd of 40,000 supporters. No foreign diplomats were in attendance; Rajoelina's foreign minister said none were invited.

== Backlash ==
On the same day, Malagasy navy troops called for Rajoelina's resignation by 25 March, threatening to use force otherwise to protect the constitution of Madagascar. According to their statement, the navy troops "condemn all violence against civilians" committed by the army corps in March and denounce Rajoelina for the "civil war occurring in Madagascar". The navy troops claimed that there was "irrefutable" evidence that Rajoelina had paid the army corps hundreds of millions of ariaries and that they should face trials in accordance with military law. The navy troops called for other nations not to get involved in what they considered a purely domestic affair.

In a recorded message from Ravalomanana played to around 10,000 of supporters on 25 March, Ravalomanana encouraged people to "save the nation, defend the union and our national unity" because Rajoelina's government was "destroying our country with their coup."

Also on 25 March, Rajoelina invited Ravalomanana's political party to join other political parties, unions, and business leaders to discuss reconciliation on 2 and 3 April. Rajoelina said the meeting would also include planning for the next elections. Rajoelina said he would appoint the members of the group who would organize the meeting. Ravalomanana's political party, Tiako I Madagasikara (TIM), did not immediately comment on whether it would participate in those meetings.

On 26 March, Rajoelina's justice minister said that Rajoelina had given a presidential pardon to 28 "political prisoners" and that more would be pardoned in the future. Members of TIM spoke to the crowd. The names of the pardoned individuals were not made public.

About 6,000 people who supported Ravalomanana assembled in a park in downtown Antananarivo on 26 March, the fourth consecutive day of such protests. Members of TIM spoke to the crowd. Referring to the reconciliation meeting proposed by Rajoelina, the speakers said that Ravalomanana would be involved only if he were recognized at the meeting as Madagascar's elected president and only if the United Nations, Southern African Development Community, or another neutral, international body organized the meeting. The speakers urged Ravalomanana to leave Swaziland, return to Madagascar, and call the bicameral parliament back in session. One speaker said that elections should only be held after Ravalomanana was reinstated as president. Following the speeches, security forces fired tear gas and shot bullets into the air to disperse the crowd.

The following day, about 6,000 people who supported Ravalomanana assembled again, the fifth such demonstration in five consecutive days. Police used tear gas on the assembled individuals at the end of the event, as they did at the end of the previous day's demonstration.

On 28 March, between 15,000 and 20,000 protesters assembled for the sixth consecutive day. In a recorded message played to the assembled crowd, Ravalomanana encouraged his supporters to continue protesting and gave assurance that he would return to Madagascar soon. While marching towards the 13 May Plaza, the same location that Rajoelina's supporters had assembled earlier in the year, police fired their weapons into the air and used tear gas to disperse the crowds. According to hospital officials, 34 people were injured. A young protester named "Razily", who was seen in a video of 28 March protests carrying the Malagasy flag at the head of the protests before being publicly beaten and carted off by police, became a cause célèbre when the video was distributed online; he has not been seen since his arrest. Police said they were trying to keep Ravalomanana's supporters from confronting Rajoelina's supporters. In response to the police actions, Ravalomanana's supporters encouraged a general strike on 30 March, with union leader Constant Raveloson saying, "Students should not go to school, office workers should stop their work and the private sector should stop paying taxes so as not to support an illegal regime." Protests continued nearly every day thereafter.

On 31 March, Rajoelina announced the individuals who would constitute the cabinet of his transitional administration for 24 months until elections are held. Rajoelina compared himself to Ravalomanana, saying that Ravalomanana was not immediately accepted by world leaders when he came to power in 2002. Rajoelina reiterated his previous statements that other countries should not "interfere" with his rise to the presidency of Madagascar. Rajoelina also announced a freeze of all mining contracts with foreign companies, saying that the foreign companies are not paying the fees and royalties that are legally due to Madagascar.

Still asserting that he was the legitimate president, Ravalomanana announced from exile that he was appointing Manandafy Rakotonirina as Prime Minister on 16 April. Ravalomanana made this announcement by telephone at a rally of his supporters in Antananarivo, with Rakotonirina in attendance.

On 20 April, people gathered in Antananarivo to listen to Ravalomanana speak by telephone and protest the closure of two radio stations, Radio Fahazavana and Radio Mada, the latter of which is owned by Ravalomanana. When the protesters began marching to a courthouse in the center of the city, police used tear gas to disperse the crowds and then fired their guns. A BBC reporter witnessed a protester killed after being shot in the back at close range. Another protester was also killed and twenty people went to the hospital for injuries sustained during the protests. The following day, thousands of people assembled to mourn the two deaths. Prime Minister Roindefo Monja announced that "all demonstrations are banned, including those in support of Andry Rajoelina, in order to restore law and order." Despite the ban, a demonstration was held the following day. Over a thousand people assembled to protest, fewer in number and shorter in duration as compared in previous days.

Cars and trucks were set on fire and people were looting in Antananarivo on 23 April. Police used tear gas, detonators, and gun fire to break up protests. Six protesters were arrested.

After Ravalomanana appointed him as Prime Minister, Rakotonirina began working out of the Carlton hotel in Antananarivo, and he appointed ministers to occupy the key government portfolios on 28 April. Soldiers with a warrant for Rakotonirina's arrest stormed the Carlton and arrested him on 29 April; they found him hiding in a bathroom after searching for about an hour. A spokesperson for Rajoelina described Rakotonirina as "the mastermind of last week's violence". Also in late April, Rajoelina's government informed the AU that it was prepared to hold an election by the end of 2009, earlier than it had previously stated.

=== Reconciliation meeting ===
At a reconciliation meeting that included four former presidents of Madagascar and United Nations negotiators, it was announced on 3 April that a constitutional referendum would be held in September 2009, parliamentary elections in March 2010 and presidential elections in October 2010.

On 11 April, Ravalomanana's supporters ended their participation in meetings with Rajoelina's supporters. Ravalomanana's supporters saying that the meetings were not worthwhile because their condition of the Ravalomanana's return to power was not met, nor was the United Nations' special envoy to Madagascar, Tiébilé Dramé, acting as an impartial mediator. In response, Dramé said he was "seeking a consensus" rather than an "imposed solution". On the same day, more than 10,000 people assembled in Antananarivo to protest Rajoelina's government.

At a meeting on 23 May 2009 a breakthrough was reached; a transitional government and a truth and reconciliation commission was agreed to be formed, and all former presidents would be allowed to stand in the presidential elections; this last point was seen as controversial, as it might increase instability. However, on 25 May 2009 the party of Didier Ratsiraka withdrew from the talks.

=== Mediation crisis talks ===
Former exiled president of Madagascar Marc Ravalomanana, President of the High Authority of Transition of Madagascar Andry Rajoelina, former exiled Madagascar president Didier Ratsiraka and former president of the Malagasy Republic Albert Zafy met on Tuesday 4 August 2009 in Maputo, Mozambican capital, for four-day-long mediation crisis talks with the former Mozambican President Joaquim Chissano acting as mediator. Representatives came from the African Union (AU), United Nations (UN), the International Organisation of the Francophonie and the Southern African Development Community (SADC). The mediation talks hoped to arrive at a way for Ravalomanana to return to Madagascar from his exile in South Africa. The talks were also a trade meeting to begin negotiations on the transition charter to seek new elections in Madagascar. Ratsiraka, who had been exiled in France, saw his amnesty issue resolved at the talks. The four leaders sought to again become a customs union (SADC), and representatives of the United Nations.

== Unity government deal ==
On 7 November 2009, the leaders agreed to a power-sharing deal in which Rajoelina stays as president, creation of two co-presidents, Fetison Rakoto Andrianirina, aide to former President Ravalomanana and Emmanuel Rakotovahiny, aide to former President Zafy. Prime Minister Eugene Mangalaza who was appointed on 10 October will be retained heading the 31-member cabinet. The deal also creates a 65-member council of transitional advisers and a transitional parliament composed of 258 members.

== Other effects ==
=== Environmental ===
During the transition in the government, people have been illegally hunting and logging in Marojejy National Park and other conservation areas in Madagascar. While the new Malagasy government is otherwise preoccupied and some park rangers have left their posts, armed groups are cutting down valuable rosewood trees. Laws prohibiting the export of rosewood were repealed in January 2009, so the illegally acquired logs can be sold and exported for profit. Thousands of local people were involved in cutting a documented 123,000 rosewood logs representing an estimated 45,000 rosewood trees from Marojejy, Masoala and Makira National Parks between January–October 2009, with at least 871 containers already exported to China between March–April 2009 alone from the Vohemar and Toamasina ports. Floating the rosewood logs down rivers also requires cutting of 4–5 lighter trees, and several rosewood species are endangered or occur at low densities below 1–5 trees per hectare. Numerous new access paths are created and some individuals built a 6-kilometer-long road into a remote northern park to transport the logs. Some ships land directly on the coast to pick up the logs, rather than at government-controlled ports. Bribery of customs officials has been reported. Radio commercials have been aired seeking workers to help in the process. Extracting resources from these conservation areas is likely to threaten already critically endangered species such as the silky sifaka lemur, one of the top 25 most endangered primates in the world. A statement jointly released by several non-governmental organizations criticized the logging and hunting occurring in national parks, illegal mining, and slash-and-burn farming occurring in Madagascar. The joint statement said that "These deplorable acts will only further impoverish the country and deprive future generations of the Malagasy people from their unique natural heritage." The groups who issued the statement were World Wide Fund for Nature, Conservation International, Wildlife Conservation Society, Missouri Botanical Garden, Durrell Wildlife Conservation Trust, Institute for the Conservation of Tropical Environment, The Peregrine Fund, ONG Fanamby, Madagascar Fauna Group, L'Homme et l'Environnement, and Plant Resources for Tropical Africa.

=== Contracts ===
In 2009, Rajoelina canceled a contract with South Korean company Daewoo. Under the contract, Daewoo would have leased 1,300,000 hectares (13,000 km^{2}) of land, almost half of Madagascar's arable land, for 99 years to grow corn and palm oil for export to South Korea, a project that might have created as many as 45,000 jobs. On 10 April 2009, Madagascar's Minister of Land Reform confirmed that the contract with Daewoo had been canceled because its "approach was wrong", even though "the project by itself wasn't bad and such a project is welcome". As of 10 April, Daewoo said it had not been informed of the contract's cancellation and would proceed with the project regardless.

On 17 March 2009, Canadian energy company Sherritt International said its 27-year $4.5-billion nickel-mining project would still begin in 2010 and reach full production in 2013, as scheduled. On 19 March 2009, it said it was likely the project's start date would be delayed.

=== Economic ===
Finance Minister Benja Razafimahaleo reported a decrease in government revenue of 15 to 20 percent. Ravalomanana owns Tiko, the largest dairy farm in Madagascar. After Rajoelina became president, Rajoelina's supporters looted Tiko dairy farms, resulting in a milk shortage in Madagascar. Revenue from foreign tourists has decreased by 70 percent, in part because some foreign countries are cautioning their citizens against visiting the country About 70 percent of hotels have closed due to the sharp drop in business. One large hotel that has remained open temporarily laid off 150 of its 400 employees and cut the hours and wages of its other 250 employees. Strikes, wage shortages, and cuts in foreign aid are also causing economic problems for the country.

=== Sports ===
On 28 January 2009, the Confederation of African Football canceled a match between Madagascar's Academie Ny Antsika and Réunion's Union Sportive Stade Tamponnaise, which was set to be played in Antananarivo.

== International reactions ==
- Canada's Minister of Foreign Affairs Lawrence Cannon said that Madagascar's recent political actions are illegal and "anti-democratic". Canada supports a peaceful and democratic resolution with help from the international community.
- Czech Republic's Foreign Minister Karel Schwarzenberg called the removal of Ravalomanana a "coup d'état".
- France's President Nicolas Sarkozy urged Madagascar to hold elections "as soon as possible" to end the "coup d'état". Sarkozy criticized the decision to dismiss Madagascar's parliament. Asserting that Ravalomanana should be kept safe, Sarkozy offered that "if he needs to be put on trial, he should be."
- Germany condemned the violent transfer of power, urging democracy to return immediately. Germany said that street protests are not a democratic method of changing the government.
- Japan's Ministry of Foreign Affairs issued a statement expressing "concern" that the governmental transition is "inconsistent with the ordinary constitutional procedures amid the political turmoil that has involved civilians". Japan "strongly expects" that democracy and constitutional order returns "at the earliest opportunity". Japan also urges that peace and the safety of civilians be upheld.
- Libya's president Muammar al-Gaddafi telephoned Rajoelina immediately after Rajoelina took power to say that Libya would recognize Rajoelina's government.
- Mexico's ambassador to the United Nations, Claude Heller, said that it was "very clear that there was an unconstitutional coup" and said that elections were the only way to move Madagascar forward.
- Nigeria's Foreign Minister Ojo Maduekwe said that Nigeria urges "a restoration of constitutional order", calling the opposition forces "illegal and unconstitutional" and their actions "unacceptable".
- Norway's Minister of the Environment and International Development Erik Solheim said that "there is an urgent need for a democratic solution to the current situation in Madagascar. The country is moving towards an economic disaster. I am deeply concerned about the people of the country".
- Russia's Minister of Foreign Affairs Sergey Lavrov stated that Russia is "concerned by the increased frequency of attempts on the African continent to resort to non-constitutional methods of solving internal political problems." He went on to say that, in addition to increasing economic and social problems, the use of force is of concern and runs counter to democratic principles, whilst affirming Russia's support of the African Union's position.
- South African Minister of Foreign Affairs Nkosazana Dlamini-Zuma said that South Africa would support "pressure", possibly including sanctions, and the "non-recognition" of Rajoelina's government by the Southern African Development Community.
- Swaziland's King Mswati said that Rajoelina's rise to power was unconstitutional and "violates basic principles, protocols and treaties".
- United Kingdom's Foreign Office Minister Mark Malloch Brown said he "condemn[s] unreservedly the unconstitutional, undemocratic and apparently coerced transfer of power from President Ravalomanana to Andry Rajoelina. These events are tantamount to a coup d'état." He urges a peaceful, constitutional, and democratic resolution.
- United States State Department spokesman Robert Wood said "The United States is deeply concerned by the recent political violence in Madagascar". He advised the Malagasy people to use restraint and sort out differences by process of dialogue. Wood later confirmed that the State Department believes that "recent political developments in Madagascar constitute an undemocratic transfer of power". On 20 March, Wood said that the United States "condemns the process" of Ravalomanana's removal and Rajoelina's takeover, calling it "undemocratic and contrary to the rule of law". United States Ambassador to Madagascar R. Niels Marquardt described a "climate of insecurity" in Madagascar. Marquardt said that Madagascar would be likely be deemed ineligible for the trade preferences under the African Growth and Opportunity Act if it did not hold elections by the end of 2009.
- Zambia's Foreign Affairs Minister Kabinga Pande called Andry Rajoelina's coming to power in Madagascar "a setback and danger to the entrenchment of democracy and constitutional rule on the continent which should not be allowed to take root. " Zambia has also led the call for economic sanctions against Madagascar and suspension of the country from the SADC and AU.
- African Union issued a statement regarding the events of 16 March, stating "The situation in Madagascar is an internal conflict. It is an attempted coup d'état. We condemn the attempted coup d'état. We ask the people of Madagascar to do everything consistent with their constitution." Madagascar's membership in the African Union was later suspended. The African Union threatened to expel Madagascar from the organization, and warned of the possibility of sanctions.
- European Commission issued a statement that it was "seriously concerned about the situation of instability and uncertainty currently prevailing in Madagascar. The European Commission calls on all parties in Madagascar to ensure calm and invites them to participate immediately in a broader dialogue."
- Inter-Parliamentary Union President Theo-Ben Gurirab said he strongly condemns the "coup d'état" in Madagascar, saying that any unconstitutional action overthrowing a government is fundamentally flawed and completely unacceptable. The Inter-Parliamentary Union suspended the membership of the parliament of Madagascar.
- South African Development Community refused to recognize Rajoelina's presidency because "his appointment does not only violate the constitution of Madagascar, but also international principles, like the SADC, AU and United Nations protocols." The SADC "strongly condemns in the strongest terms the circumstances that led to the ousting of a democratically elected president of Madagascar." The SADC says that elections should be held within six months, rather than twenty-four months as proposed by Rajoelina. The SADC suspended Madagascar's membership until it restores constitutional order, and it urged Rajoelina to step down so that Ravalomanana could be reinstated as president. If Rajoelina does not comply with its decisions, the "SADC shall in collaboration with the African Union and the United Nations consider other options to restore constitutional normalcy." On 1 April, Madagascar withdrew its membership in the SADC. A delegation from the SADC visited Madagascar on 20 April, and another delegation visited on 23 April.
- United Nations Secretary-General Ban Ki-moon called on the Malagasy Government to give absolute priority to protection of the general population. He expressed concern about "the serious unrest" and the deaths. Assistant Secretary-General for Political Affairs Haile Menkerios said that the United Nations urges "quick and inclusive elections" to return to a constitutional government in a process decided upon by the current and former governments.

=== Sanctions and suspensions of aid ===
Since 16 March, Norway has instituted sanctions, mostly consisting of a freeze of economic aid, primarily due to the unstable atmosphere in the country prior to the resignation of Ravalomanana, and it has retained such sanctions for the time being.

On 20 March, U.S. State Department spokesman Robert Wood said the United States will suspend all non-humanitarian assistance to Madagascar.

The African Union suspended Madagascar's membership in the organization. The Peace and Security Council of the African Union announced that it would impose sanctions on the Madagascar government if an "unconstitutional" transfer of power were to take place, including total expulsion from the African Union. The African Union can enact sanctions if Madagascar does not restore constitutional order within six months.

The African Union's stance was corroborated by Czech Foreign Minister Karel Schwarzenberg, who stated that the European Union may impose sanctions on Madagascar and not recognize the transfer of power, and the United States Department of State, which indicated a similar response to any "extra-constitutional" regime change. The Southern African Development Community will meet in late March to consider sanctions.

On 31 March, the European Union said it had not suspended its aid to Madagascar, which will continue for the next three years as previously agreed, but it also had no plans for new aid.

US President Barack Obama decided to remove Madagascar from the beneficiary of the AGOA African Growth and Opportunity Act. On 23 December of the year 2009, President Obama also terminated the program for Guinea, Niger and Madagascar because of their undemocratic changes of power. The AGOA program has helped created ten of thousands of jobs for middle class Malagasy especially in apparel manufacturing factories, it is feared that most of these jobs will be lost in the near future. Considering the important number of business affected by this decision, the economy of the capital city Antananarivo and Antsirabe will be deeply affected fearing further social tension.

=== Government response ===
Most of the government response has been channeled through opposition prime minister Monja Roindefo, who denied that the events leading to Rajoelina's gaining of the presidency was a coup, but rather a "direct expression of democracy, when representative democracy does not express itself through the institutions", and called on the European Union to reconsider its reaction to the events. Rajoelina dismissed the condemnations, stating that "if they haven't understood the process, they may well react. But if they stick to their line after we have spoken, it will be annoying".

Rajoelina has promised that the high cost of living would decrease because merchants had agreed to decrease the price of bread and cooking oil as of 30 March, and the cost of rice soon thereafter.

In response to the Southern African Development Community's view that Rajoelina's rise to power was unconstitutional and its urging for elections within six months, Rajoelina said that membership in the SADC is "not in the interests of Madagascar". He said he would confer with others to decide whether Madagascar would continue to be a member of the SADC. "The prospect of an SADC intervention is unacceptable. Other states cannot interfere with the decision of (Madagascar's) High Constitutional Court" that the transfer of power to Rajoelina was constitutional.

== See also ==
- Rotaka
- 1990-1992 Movement in Madagascar
- 2002 Malagasy political crisis
- 2025 Malagasy protests
