= Judged by Your Work Party =

Political party in Madagascar

- Leader: Norbert Ratsirahonana
- Founded: 2001
- Political position: Centre

The Judged By Your Work Party (Asa Vita no Ifampitsarana, Akaiky ny Vahoaka Indrindra, AVI) is a centrist political party in Madagascar.

The AVI backed Marc Ravalomanana, the opposition candidate in the disputed December 2001 presidential election, and after Ravalomanana became president, the AVI joined the government. Julien Reboza of the AVI became Minister of Spatial Planning in the first government named under Ravalomanana on March 1, 2002. On January 16, 2003, Reboza was replaced as the AVI's representative in the government by two new ministers, Roger Mahazoasy (Minister of Tourism) and Jean-Jacques Rabenirina (Minister of Labor and Social Legislation), and in the government named on January 5, 2004, Rabenirina was the only minister from the AVI, as Minister of Culture and Tourism.

AVI leader Norbert Ratsirahonana decided to stand as a candidate in the December 2006 Madagascar presidential election, which brought an end to his party's alliance with Ravalomanana. Rabenirina was dismissed from the government on October 4, 2006. Ratsirahonana won 4.22% of the vote in the presidential election. The AVI chose to boycott the April 2007 constitutional referendum. On October 26, 2007, it announced that it was boycotting the local elections planned for late 2007. Following the 23 September 2007 parliamentary election it was not represented in National Assembly.
