= 2026 in Madagascar =

- Decades: 2000s; 2010s; 2020s
- See also: Other events of 2026; Timeline of Madagascan history

This article is about events in the year 2026 in Madagascar

== Incumbents ==
- President: Michael Randrianirina
- Prime Minister: Herintsalama Rajaonarivelo (until 9 March); Mamitiana Rajaonarison (since 15 March)

== Events ==
=== January ===
- 24 January – A magnitude 4.8 earthquake hits Itasy Region, injuring one person.
- 30 January – The government lifts a 16-year moratorium on issuing new mining permits for most minerals, ending a suspension in place since 2010 while maintaining the ban on gold mining permits.
- 31 January – Cyclone Fytia makes landfall over Madagascar, leaving 14 people dead.

=== February ===
- 6–22 February – Madagascar at the 2026 Winter Olympics
- 10 February – Cyclone Gezani makes landfall over Toamasina, leaving at least 59 people dead and 15 missing, and destroying 75% of the city.

=== March ===
- 9 March — President Randrianirina dismisses prime minister Herintsalama Rajaonarivelo and dissolves the government.
- 15 March – President Randrianirina appoints anti-corruption chief Mamitiana Rajaonarison as Prime Minister.
- 19 March – President Randrianirina orders polygraph screenings for would-be government ministers.

=== April ===
- 7 April – The cabinet declares a nationwide 15-day state of energy emergency, due to fuel shortages and disruptions in energy supply amid the 2026 Iran war.
- 29 April – Authorities detain former French soldier Guy Baret in connection with an alleged plot to destabilise the country, involving plans to incite a military mutiny, sabotage key infrastructure, and cause a nationwide disruption.

=== May ===
- 28 May – The High Constitutional Court of Madagascar dismisses a petition by opposition MP Antoine Rajerison to remove Michael Randrianirina as president.

=== September ===
- 1 September – A court in Antananarivo convicts former Senate president Richard Ravalomanana of complicity in murder over the killing of demonstrators during the 2025 Malagasy protests and sentences him to 10 years' hard labour.

== Holidays ==
- 1 January – New Year's Day
- 8 March – International Women's Day
- 29 March – Martyrs' Day
- 30 March – Eid al-Fitr
- 21 April – Easter Monday
- 1 May – Labour Day
- 29 May – Ascension Day
- 9 June – Whit Monday
- 6 June – Eid al-Adha
- 26 June – Independence Day
- 15 August – Assumption Day
- 1 November – All Saints' Day
- 25 December – Christmas Day

== Deaths ==
- 15 March – Richard Randriamandrato, 67, minister of economy (2019–2021) and foreign affairs (2021).

== See also ==
- International Organization of Francophone countries (OIF)
