= 2027 in Madagascar =

- Decades: 2000s; 2010s; 2020s
- See also: Other events of 2027; Timeline of Madagascan history

This article is about events in the year 2027 in Madagascar

== Events ==
=== Predicted and scheduled ===
- 2 August – Solar eclipse of August 2, 2027 (partial eclipse)
- November – 2027 Malagasy presidential election

== Holidays ==
- 1 January – New Year's Day
- 8 March – International Women's Day
- 9 March – Eid al-Fitr
- 29 March –
  - Martyrs' Day
  - Easter Monday
- 1 May – Labour Day
- 6 May – Ascension Day
- 16 June – Eid al-Adha
- 17 June – Whit Monday
- 26 June – Independence Day
- 15 August – Assumption Day
- 1 November – All Saints' Day
- 25 December – Christmas Day

== See also ==
- International Organization of Francophone countries (OIF)
