= 2022 in Madagascar =

- Decades: 2000s; 2010s; 2020s
- See also: Other events of 2022; Timeline of Madagascan history

This article is about events in the year 2022 in Madagascar

== Incumbents ==
- President: Andry Rajoelina
- Prime Minister: Christian Ntsay

== Events ==
Ongoing – COVID-19 pandemic in Madagascar; 2021–2022 Madagascar famine; 2022 Africa floods

- 18 January – 2022 Antananarivo floods: At least ten people are killed by floods in Antananarivo.
- 24 January – Tropical Storm Ana kills 23 people in Madagascar.
- 6 February – Cyclone Batsirai, a category 4 cyclone on the Saffir–Simpson scale, kills at least 10 people and displaces more than 48,000 after making landfall in Madagascar.
- 8 March – Cyclone Gombe makes landfall in the Sava Region.
- 29 August – In Ikongo,18 people are killed and 34 are wounded when police open fire on a group protesting the kidnapping of a child with albinism.

== Sports ==
- 4 – 20 February: Madagascar at the 2022 Winter Olympics
- 4 – 14 August: 2022 FIBA U18 African Championship (Host)

== See also ==
- COVID-19 pandemic in Africa
- 2022–23 South-West Indian Ocean cyclone season
- International Organization of Francophone countries (OIF)
