= 2021 in Madagascar =

- Decades: 2000s; 2010s; 2020s
- See also: Other events of 2021; Timeline of Madagascan history

This article is about events in the year 2021 in Madagascar

== Incumbents ==
- President: Andry Rajoelina
- Prime Minister: Christian Ntsay

== Events ==
Ongoing – COVID-19 pandemic in Madagascar

- 11 February – Roman Catholic priest Pedro Opeka is nominated for a Nobel Peace Prize for his work with the poor in Antananarivo.
- 17 September - Suspected criminals, known locally as Dahalo, attacked the villages of Ambohitsohy and Vohitsimbe in Marovitsika Commune, Befotaka Atsi Region. The incidents involved up to 120 assailants. At least 46 people were killed in the clashes, including 42 suspected Dahalo and four villagers. The motive for the incident is not clear; however, attacks have been linked to cultural practices involving cattle rustling.
- 20 December - 2021 Madagascar shipwreck

== Sports ==
- 16 January – It was announced that Madagascar will organize the 2023 Indian Ocean Islands Games since the Seychelles has withdrawn.

== Deaths ==
- 28 March — Didier Ratsiraka, Former President of Madagascar

== See also ==
- 2021 in East Africa
- COVID-19 pandemic in Africa
- 2021–22 South-West Indian Ocean cyclone season
- International Organization of Francophone countries (OIF)
