= 2020 in Madagascar =

- Decades: 2000s; 2010s; 2020s
- See also: Other events of 2020; Timeline of Madagascan history

This article is about events in the year 2020 in Madagascar

== Incumbents ==
- President: Andry Rajoelina
- Prime Minister: Christian Ntsay

== Events ==
- 20 March – The first three cases of COVID-19 in the country were confirmed in Antananarivo.
- 16 May – The first COVID-19 death in the country, an unnamed 57-year-old medical worker who had diabetes and high blood pressure, was reported.

== See also ==
- 2020 in East Africa
- COVID-19 pandemic in Africa
- 2020–21 South-West Indian Ocean cyclone season
