= 2010 in Madagascar =

- Decades: 1990s; 2000s; 2010s; 2020s
- See also: Other events of 2010; Timeline of Madagascan history

The following lists events that happened during 2010 in Madagascar.

== Incumbents ==
- President: Andry Rajoelina (transitional president)
- Prime Minister: Albert Camille Vital

== Events ==
=== November ===
- November 17 - failed military coup attempt against President of the High Transitional Authority of Madagascar Andry Rajoelina.
