= 2015 in Madagascar =

- Decades: 1990s; 2000s; 2010s; 2020s
- See also: Other events of 2015; Timeline of Madagascan history

The following lists events that happened during 2015 in Madagascar.

== Incumbents ==
- President: Hery Rajaonarimampianina
- Prime Minister: Roger Kolo (until January 17), Jean Ravelonarivo (starting January 17)
