= 2023 in Madagascar =

- Decades: 2000s; 2010s; 2020s
- See also: Other events of 2023; Timeline of Madagascan history

This article is about events in the year 2023 in Madagascar

== Incumbents ==
- President: Andry Rajoelina
- Prime Minister: Christian Ntsay

== Events ==
Ongoing – COVID-19 pandemic in Madagascar; 2021–2022 Madagascar famine;

- 16 January – 1 February – Cyclone Cheneso kills at least 33 people.
- 12 March – At least 22 people are killed and two others are reported missing after a boat heading to Mayotte capsizes off the coast of Madagascar.
- 12 October – Madagascar's constitutional court postpones the upcoming election from 9 November to 16 November 2023, amidst a political crisis involving protests against the Ntsay government following President Andry Rajoelina's resignation.
- 16 November – 2023 Malagasy presidential election: Citizens of Madagascar vote for a president.

== See also ==
- COVID-19 pandemic in Africa
- 2022–23 South-West Indian Ocean cyclone season
- International Organization of Francophone countries (OIF)
