= 2017 in Madagascar =

- Decades: 1990s; 2000s; 2010s; 2020s
- See also: Other events of 2017; Timeline of Madagascan history

Events in the year 2017 in Madagascar

== Incumbents ==
- President: Hery Rajaonarimampianina
- Prime Minister: Olivier Mahafaly Solonandrasana
