= 2018 in Madagascar =

- Decades: 1990s; 2000s; 2010s; 2020s
- See also: Other events of 2018; Timeline of Madagascan history

Events in the year 2018 in Madagascar.

== Incumbents ==
- President: Hery Rajaonarimampianina (until September 7, Rivo Rakotovao (acting, from September 7)
- Prime Minister: Olivier Mahafaly Solonandrasana (until June 6, Christian Ntsay (from June 6)

== Events ==
- November/December – The first round of the 2018 Malagasy presidential election was held on 7 November, and a second round involving the top two candidates, Andry Rajoelina and Marc Ravalomanana, was held on 19 December. On 27 December Rajoelina was announced as the winner with 56% of the vote.

== Sports ==
- 9 to 25 February – Madagascar participated at the 2018 Winter Olympics in PyeongChang, South Korea, with one competitor in alpine skiing.

== Deaths ==
- 17 April – Philibert Randriambololona, Roman Catholic prelate, Bishop of Antsirabe and Archbishop of Fianarantsoa (b. 1927).
