= Sherritt International =

Canadian resource company

Sherritt International Corporation
- Type: Public
- Traded as: TSX: S
- Industry: Mining, Oil and Gas
- Founded: 1927
- Headquarters: Toronto, Ontario Canada
- Key people: Leon Binedell, Chairman, President & CEO
- Products: nickel, cobalt, oil, gas, power, fertilizer
- Revenue: CA$497 million (combined) (2020)
- Number of employees: 3,255 (2020)
- Website: www.sherritt.com

Sherritt International is a Canadian resource company, based in Toronto, Ontario. Sherritt is a miner and refiner of nickel and cobalt. Sherritt is also the largest independent energy producer in Cuba. Sherritt’s common shares are listed on the Toronto Stock Exchange under the symbol "S".

== Operations ==
=== Mining ===
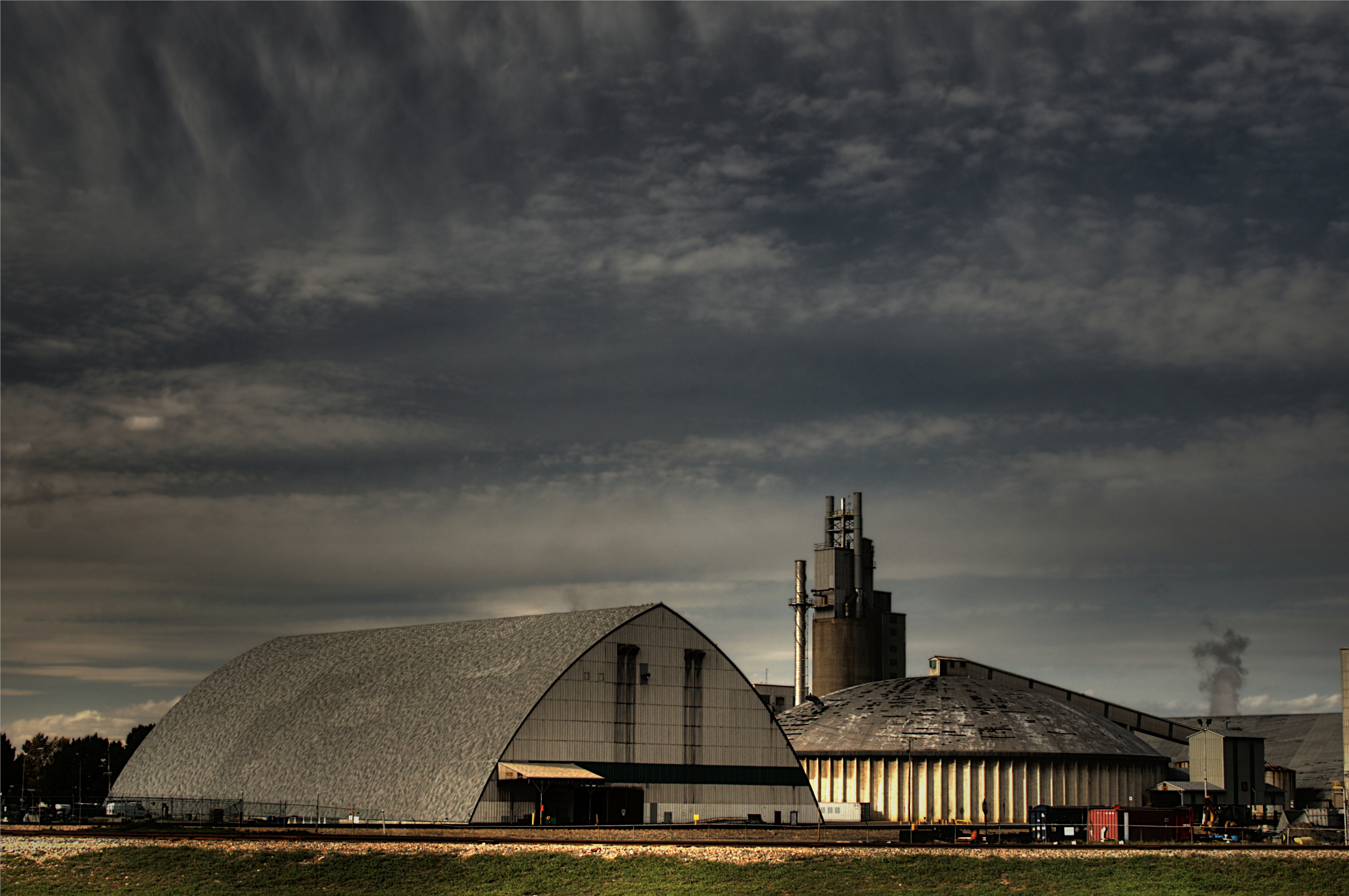
Structures on the grounds of the Sherritt plant, Fort Saskatchewan, Alberta, Canada

==== Moa Joint Venture ====
Sherritt has a 50/50 partnership with General Nickel Company S.A. (GNC) of Cuba (the Moa Joint Venture) and a wholly‑owned fertilizer business and sulphuric acid, utilities and fertilizer storage facilities in Fort Saskatchewan, Alberta, Canada (Fort Site) that provides additional sources of income.

The Moa Joint Venture mines, processes and refines nickel and cobalt for sale worldwide (except in the United States). The Moa Joint Venture is a vertically‑integrated joint venture that mines lateritic ore by open pit methods and processes them at its facilities at Moa, Cuba into mixed sulphides containing nickel and cobalt. The mixed sulphides are transported to the refining facilities in Fort Saskatchewan, Alberta. The resulting nickel and cobalt products are sold to various markets, primarily in Europe, Japan and China. At current depletion rates, the concessions of the Moa Joint Venture are planned to be mined until at least 2034. In Q2 2019, the Moa Joint Venture filed an updated National Instrument 43-101 technical report on SEDAR that confirmed the current mineral reserves and outlined increased mineral resources with the potential to extend Moa's mine life.

The Fort Site facilities provides inputs (ammonia, sulphuric acid and utilities) for the Moa Joint Venture metals refinery, produces agriculture fertilizer for sale in Western Canada and provides additional fertilizer storage and administrative facilities. The metals refinery facilities in Fort Saskatchewan have an annual production capacity of approximately 35,000 (100% basis) tonnes of nickel and approximately 3,800 (100% basis) tonnes of cobalt.

==== Ambatovy Joint Venture ====
In 2007, Sherritt acquired a 40% interest in the Ambatovy Joint Venture to develop and build a vertically-integrated nickel and cobalt mining, processing, refining and marketing operation in Madagascar. The Joint Venture reached commercial production in 2014 and comprises (i) a mine and an ore preparation plant located in the immediate vicinity of the ore bodies near Moramanga in eastern central Madagascar, (ii) a pipeline, approximately 220 kilometres long, to transport the mined laterite ore in the form of prepared slurry from the ore preparation plant at the mine to the processing plant which is located just south of the port city of Toamasina, and (iii) a processing plant, including a refinery, that produces LME-grade finished nickel, as well as cobalt metal.

In 2017, Sherritt exchanged CAD1.4 billion in debt to its joint venture partners for 28% of its interest in the joint venture. In 2020, Sherritt exchanged its 12% interest in the joint venture for the remaining partner loans.

=== Oil and gas ===
Sherritt's Oil and Gas division explores for oil and gas primarily from reservoirs located offshore, but close to the coastline along the north coast of Cuba. Specialized long reach directional drilling methods are being used to economically exploit these reserves from land‑based drilling locations.

Sherritt currently has an interest in three PSCs in the exploration phase.

In addition, Sherritt holds working‑interests in several oil fields and the related production platform located in the Gulf of Valencia in Spain.

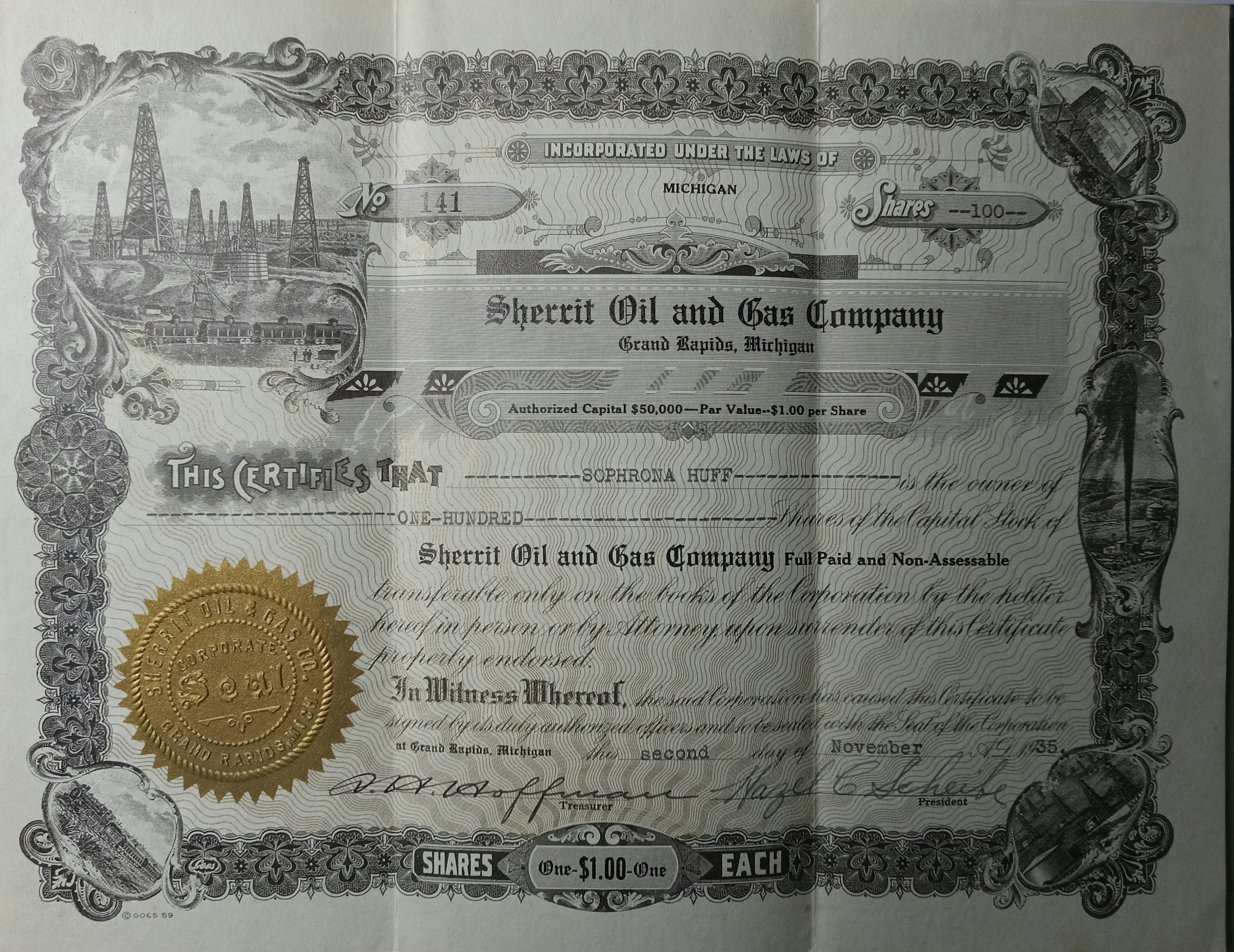

=== Electricity ===
Sherritt's primary power generating assets are located in Cuba at Varadero, Boca de Jaruco, and Puerto Escondido. These assets are held by Sherritt through its one‑third interest in Energas S.A. (Energas), which is a Cuban joint arrangement established to process raw natural gas and generate electricity for sale to the Cuban national electrical grid. Cuban government agencies Unión Eléctrica (UNE) and Unión Cubapetróleo (CUPET) hold the remaining two‑thirds interest in Energas.

Raw natural gas is supplied to Energas by CUPET free of charge. The processing of raw natural gas produces clean natural gas, used to generate electricity, as well as by‑products such as condensate and liquefied petroleum gas. All of Energas' electrical generation is purchased by UNE under long‑term fixed‑price contracts while the by‑products are purchased by CUPET or a Cuban entity providing natural gas to the city of Havana at market based prices. Sherritt provided the financing for the construction of the Energas facilities and is being repaid from the cash flows generated by the facilities.

The Energas facilities, which consist of the two combined cycle plants at Varadero and Boca de Jaruco, produce electricity using natural gas and steam generated from the waste heat captured from the gas turbines. Energas' electrical generating capacity is 506 MW.

=== Fertilizer ===
Sherritt owns assets, which produce fertilizer products, primarily for sale in the Western Canadian market, and which provide some of the critical input requirements for the Fort Saskatchewan metals refinery. Revenue is derived primarily from the sale of nitrogen fertilizers, and of sulphate fertilizers produced directly or indirectly as a by-product of the metals refining process.

=== Technologies ===
Sherritt's Technologies group provided technical support, process optimization and technology development services to Sherritt's operating divisions, and identified opportunities for the Corporation as a result of its research and development activities. Its activities included the internally focused development of technologies that provided strategic advantages to the Corporation; evaluating, developing and commercializing process technologies for natural resource based industries, in particular for the hydrometallurgical recovery of non-ferrous metals; and providing technical support for Sherritt’s operations, marketing and business development arms.

The Technologies division was closed in July 2025 as part of the organization's efforts to adapt to the current business environment (low nickel prices), resulting in a significant reduction of Sherritt's workforce.

== History ==
The company was named after Carl Sherritt, an American citizen and teamster on local rail construction projects who, after becoming a trapper and prospector, staked copper prospects in the Cold Lake area of Manitoba; and J. Peter Gordon, a civil engineer who had also worked on the railroad construction. Eldon Brown was the company's first employee and general superintendent.

The company operated the Sherritt-Gordon Mine from 1931 until 1951, leaving behind 7.7 mega tons of tailings, polluting Kississing Lake in what the Winnipeg Free Press described the pollution around the mine as "one of the worst cases of acidic mine drainage in the world".

The Sherritt process, hydrometallurgical cobalt extraction techniques that enhance recovery from nickel-cobalt sulfide concentrates, is named for Sherritt Gordon Mines Ltd.

- 1927: Incorporation of Sherritt Gordon Mines Limited.
- 1954: Construction of the refinery at Fort Saskatchewan, Alberta.
- 1957: Sherritt purchased the interests of Chemico in all patents in the chemical metallurgical field in which Sherritt was involved.
- 1991: Sherritt acquires Canada Northwest Energy Limited, a producer of oil and gas.
- 1993: Company renamed to Sherritt Inc.
- 1994: Sherritt becomes the largest producer of nitrogen and phosphate fertilizers in Canada after acquiring fertilizer assets from Imperial Oil Limited.
- 1995: Incorporation of Sherritt International Corporation, with interest in mining, oil and gas and technology business in Cuba. Nickel, cobalt, oil and gas production begins in Cuba.
- 1998: Creation of Sherritt Power Corporation, building gas-fired electricity generation plants in Cuba, with a 30% interest in Energas SA.
- 1998: Sherritt acquires 37.5 percent share of Cubacel, the cellular telephone operator in Cuba for $US38 million. Sherritt also created a company called "Sherritt Green", a small agricultural branch of the company, cultivating a variety of vegetables for the tourist market as well as a 25 percent share of the Las Americas Hotel and golf course in Varadero and a 12.5 percent share of the Melia Habana Hotel. These investments have been sold.
- 2001: Creation of Luscar Energy Partnership in cooperation with Ontario Teachers' Pension Plan Board by acquiring Luscar Ltd., Canada's largest coal producer for a deal worth $CDN 1 billion.
- 2005: Two Canadian energy conglomerates, Sherritt International and Pebercan Inc, discovered a new oil field off Cuba's northern coast containing 100 million barrels of oil.
- 2007: Sherritt acquires Dynatec mining corporation in a friendly takeover. Among the assets was the Ambatovy mine nickel project in Madagascar.
- 2008: Sherritt acquires all outstanding shares from Royal Utilities Income Trust. Royal Utilities Income Trust owned Prairie Mines & Royalty Ltd, that operates thermal coal mines in Saskatchewan and Alberta.
- 2008: Sherritt Technologies, a Division of Sherritt International Corporation, Licenses Technology to Chinese Zinc Producer.
- 2010: Sherritt to acquire a controlling interest from Rio Tinto in the Sulawesi Nickel Project in Indonesia. The Sulawesi Project currently ranks as one of the largest known undeveloped, greenfield laterite nickel deposits in the world. This project has since been abandoned.
- 2012: The Ambatovy Joint Venture begins production — reaches commercial production in 2014.
- 2014: Sherritt sells coal investments for $946 million (CDN) to Westmoreland Coal Company.
- 2016: Sherritt bondholders support a 3-year extension of maturities.
- 2018: Sherritt further strengthens its balance sheet by repurchasing $130 million of debentures following a successful equity unit offering.
- 2019: Sherritt's Cuban partners ratify overdue receivables agreement for the repayment of US$150 million.
- 2019: Sherritt reaches 3 billion pounds of cumulative nickel production at its refinery in Fort Saskatchewan
- 2020: Sherritt completed a balance sheet initiative aimed at improving the Corporation's liquidity which resulted in reducing debt levels by more than $300 million, annual cash interest payments by $16 million, extending our first material debt repayment to November 2026, and exchanging its 12% interest the Ambatovy Joint Venture for amounts owed to the Ambatovy Partners.
- 2026: Sherritt withdrew from Cuba, where it mines nickel and cobalt, in May 2026 out of fear of U.S. sanctions amid a tightening of the U.S. embargo against the island.
- 2026: Sold a majority stake in its business to former Trump administration advisor Ray Washburne.
