= 2014 in Madagascar =

- Decades: 1990s; 2000s; 2010s; 2020s
- See also: Other events of 2014; Timeline of Madagascan history

The following lists events that happened during 2014 in Madagascar.

== Incumbents ==
- President: Andry Rajoelina (until January 25), Hery Rajaonarimampianina (starting January 25)
- Prime Minister: Omer Beriziky (until April 16), Roger Kolo (starting April 16)

== Events ==
=== January ===
- January 31 - Hundreds of endangered species from Madagascar are found in a South African airport.

=== November ===
- November 21 - The World Health Organization reports that an outbreak of bubonic plague in Madagascar has killed 40 people.
