= 2019 in Madagascar =

- Decades: 1990s; 2000s; 2010s; 2020s
- See also: Other events of 2019; Timeline of Madagascan history

Events in the year 2019 in Madagascar.

== Incumbents ==
- President: Rivo Rakotovao (until 19 January), Andry Rajoelina (starting 19 January)
- Prime Minister: Christian Ntsay

== Events ==
- 4 to 9 March – Cyclone Idai hit northwestern Madagascar.
- 21 to 23 April – Cyclone Kenneth passes through the north of Madagascar.
- 27 May – Parliamentary election concluded with Young Malagasies Determined gaining majority seats.
- 26 June – A stampede in Antananarivo resulted in the death of 16 people.
- 9 to 11 December – Cyclone Belna hit Madagascar.
