= 2016 in Madagascar =

- Decades: 1990s; 2000s; 2010s; 2020s
- See also: Other events of 2016; Timeline of Madagascan history

Events in the year 2016 in Madagascar.

== Incumbents ==
- President: Hery Rajaonarimampianina
- Prime Minister: Jean Ravelonarivo (until April 13), Olivier Mahafaly Solonandrasana (starting April 13)

== Events ==
=== April ===
- April 11 - Jean Ravelonarivo left office as Prime Minister
- April 11 - Olivier Mahafaly Solonandrasana took office as Prime Minister
