= Ambatovy mine =

Mine in Madagascar

Ambatovy
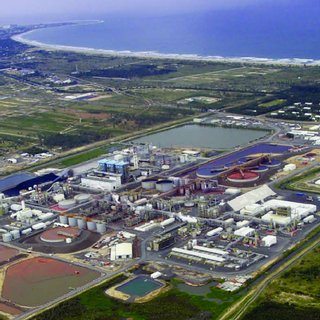
- Ambarovy ore processing plant

- Location within Madagascar
- Location: Moramanga, Atsinanana and Alaotra Mangoro, Madagascar; 18.845°S 48.307°E
- Products: Nickel; Cobalt; Ammonium sulfate
- Type: surface
- Discovered: 1960
- Opened: 2012
- Company: Sumitomo Corporation (54.18%); Korea Mine Rehabilitation and Mineral Resources Corporation {KOMIR) (45.82%)
- Website: ambatovy.com
- Acquired: 2015

The Ambatovy mine is a large open cut lateritic nickel-cobalt mine located in Madagascar, off the east coast of Africa. The largest mine in the country, it is a major contributor to the economy of Madagascar.

== Ownership and operations ==
Several exploration permits for the site were acquired by Phelps Dodge in 1995. In 2004 and 2005 Phelps Dodge sold its interest in the project to Dynatec Mining Limited, a Canadian company. Dynatec began mine development in 2007, backed by international development groups including the European Investment Bank. Sherritt International acquired Dynatec and later transferred majority control of the mine in a debt for equity swap to the Japanese Sumitomo Corporation. The rest of equity in the mine is held by the Korean State-owned Korea Mine Rehabilitation and Mineral Resources Corporation (KOMIR).

Until 2020, when production was suspended due to the COVID-19 pandemic in Madagascar, the mine was producing 4,000 tonnes of refined cobalt and almost 40,000 tonnes of refined nickel every year. Operations resumed in March 2021. After running at a loss from 2014 to 2020, the mine became profitable in 2021, especially after a large increase in nickel prices due to the Russian invasion of Ukraine.

== Economic impact ==
During construction, Ambatovy accounted for 35% of the total foreign direct investment in the country, between 2006 and 2012. Ambatovy accounts for 32% of Madagascar’s foreign exchange earnings. In 2022 the company paid 44 million US$ (198 Billion ariary) in mining taxes & fees to the Malagasy government. Furthermore US$340 million were spent with local purchases. 40,000 tonnes of nickel and 3600 tons of cobalt were produced during the same year.

== Social and environmental impacts ==
Ambatovy is the largest investment in Madagascar's history. The mine employs 10,000 people, of which 8,000 are Malagasy, and provides 27 per cent of the country's tax revenues.

The mine has been criticised for its local environmental impacts. The open pit mine displaced 1,600 hectares (4,000 acres) of rainforest and is connected by a 200 km long slurry pipeline to the processing plant at Toamasina, which has a 750-hectare (1,900-acre) area tailings dam constructed to contain and store waste (tailings) from plant operations. The mine is among the first to fully offset the loss of forest from mining operations.
