= DMC Mining Services =

DMC Mining Services is a mining services contractor founded in 1980 operating in Canada (headquarters in Vaughan, Ontario), the United States, Chile, and Mongolia

DMC Mining Services delivers end-to-end services, integrating engineering, procurement, and construction. Company’s services include: shaft sinking, mine construction, raise boring, Alimak raise, mine development, contract mining, engineering, estimating, project management, and project controls. The company provides mine contracting services to clients worldwide.

== History ==
The company was founded in 1980 as Dynatec Mining Limited. Dynatec began as a privately held mining services company that specialized in shaft sinking, mine construction, lateral development for hard rock and soft rock mines, and raise development. The company's principal founders were W. Robert Dengler 1940-2025, William M. Shaver, and Fred Edwards. Dynatec grew to become one of the major Canadian mine contracting firms providing services to the mining industry in Canada and abroad and was employed by many of the major mining companies.

Dynatec Mining Limited was acquired by the Metallurgical services division of Sherritt International, and spun out as a publicly traded company "Dynatec Corporation" on the TSX as a dividend in kind to Sherritt shareholders. The company's focus shifted to equity ownership of mining properties through the late 1990s until it was subsequently acquired in a friendly takeover offer by Sherritt during 2007.

In 2007 Dynatec became a division of FNX Mining Company and renamed as DMC Mining Services. Five years later, in 2012 the company was acquired by KGHM Polska Miedź S.A. Since then, DMC has been steadily developing and expanding its global operations. In 2019, it launched operations in Chile, where it quickly became one of the key contractors. Currently, DMC is operating in 3 countries, with 6 offices globally and a workforce of over 2,000, growing daily.
