= 2024 in Madagascar =

- Decades: 2000s; 2010s; 2020s
- See also: Other events of 2024; Timeline of Madagascan history

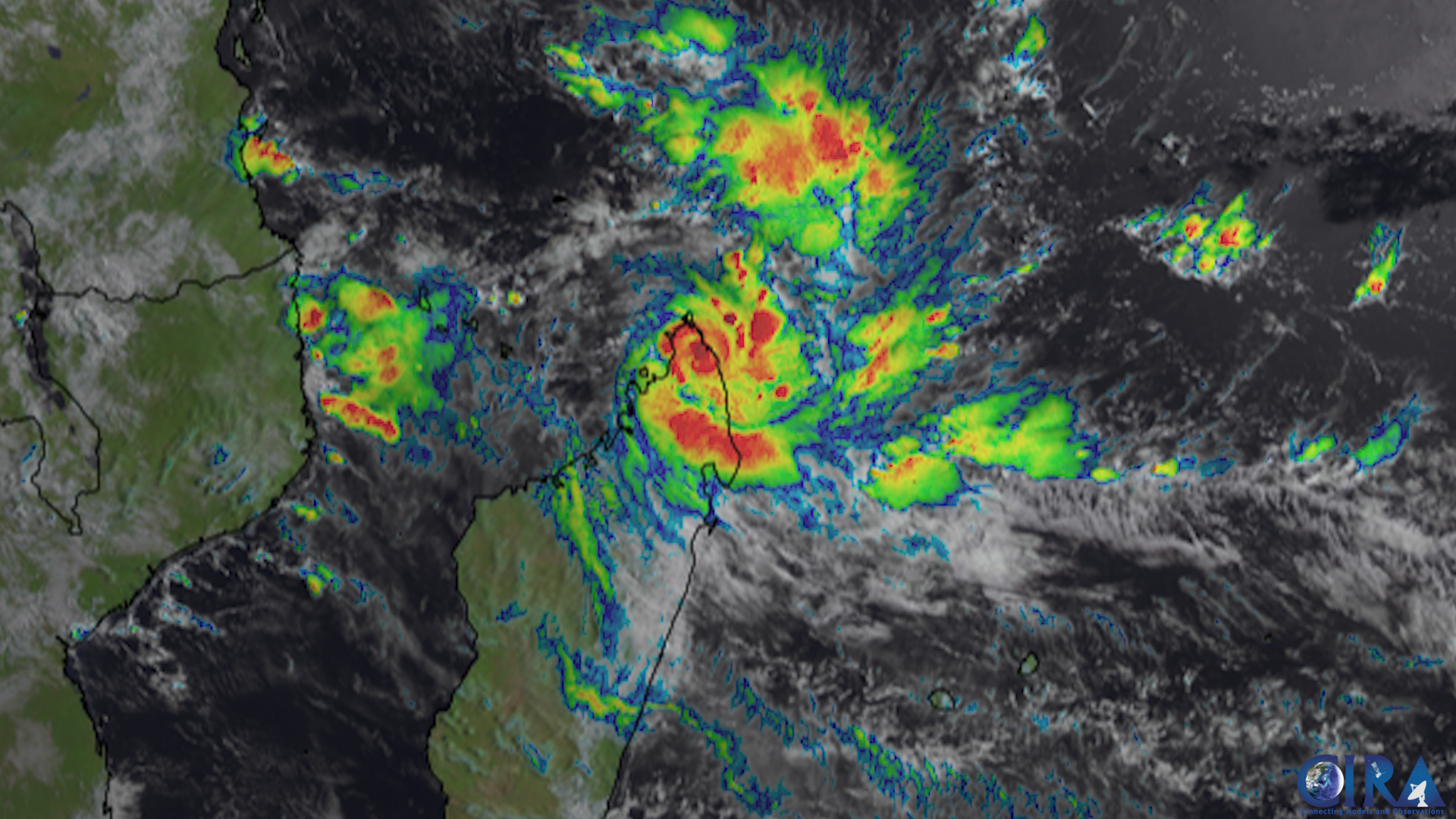
Cyclone Gamane

This article is about events in the year 2024 in Madagascar

== Incumbents ==
- President: Andry Rajoelina
- Prime Minister: Christian Ntsay

== Events ==
- 2 February – Parliament passes a law allowing chemical castration and surgical castration for those convicted of raping a minor.
- 27 March – At least 18 people are killed after Cyclone Gamane makes landfall in Vohemar District.
- 29 May – 2024 Malagasy parliamentary election: The ruling TGV party loses its majority in the National Assembly.
- May: Independent MP Marie Jeanne d’Arc Masy Goulamaly is arrested after filing complaints of electoral irregularities. She is released after several days.
- 28 June – The government promulgates the implementing decree of a new mining code, developed with the World Bank, to clarify permit rules and increase state royalties from 2% to 5%.
- 2 October – The Ambatovy mine shuts down its ore pipeline to a processing plant after damage is reported, with operations under assessment by majority shareholder Sumitomo Corporation.
- 24 November – Two motorboats carrying Somali migrants capsize in the Indian Ocean near Nosy Be, killing 25 passengers.

== Holidays ==
- 1 January – New Year's Day
- 8 March – International Women's Day
- 29 March – Martyrs' Day
- 1 April – Easter Monday
- 10 April – Eid al-Fitr
- 1 May – Labour Day
- 9 May – Ascension Day
- 20 May – Whit Monday
- 17 June – Eid al-Adha
- 26 June – Independence Day
- 15 August – Assumption Day
- 1 November – All Saints' Day
- 25 December – Christmas Day

== See also ==
- 2023–24 South-West Indian Ocean cyclone season
- International Organization of Francophone countries (OIF)
