= 2010 Madagascar coup attempt =

Failed military coup attempt

The 2010 Madagascar coup d'état attempt was a failed military coup attempt against President of the High Transitional Authority of Madagascar Andry Rajoelina on November 17–18, 2010. The coup attempt leaders were ex-Defense Minister Noel Rakotonandrasanana and Colonel Charles Andrianasoaviana, the head of the Special Intervention Force.
