= 2025 in Madagascar =

- Decades: 2000s; 2010s; 2020s
- See also: Other events of 2025; Timeline of Madagascan history

This article is about events in the year 2025 in Madagascar

== Incumbents ==
- President: Andry Rajoelina (until 14 October); Michael Randrianirina (since 14 October)
- Prime Minister: Christian Ntsay (until 6 October); Ruphin Zafisambo (until 14 October); Herintsalama Rajaonarivelo (since 20 October)

== Events ==
=== January ===
- 11 January – At least three people are killed after Cyclone Dikeledi makes landfall in northern Madagascar.

=== May ===
- 27 May – Airtel Madagascar secures a 15-year license for global telecom operations.

=== July ===
- 11 July – A court sentences a man to life imprisonment with hard labour and surgical castration for raping a six-year-old girl in 2024, marking the first such sentence in Madagascar.

=== August ===
- 17 August – 45th Summit of the Southern African Development Community.
- 26 August – The skull of King Toera of Menabe, who was killed by French colonial soldiers in 1897, is returned to Malagasy officials along with the skulls of two of his companions by France, where they had been stored at the National Museum of Natural History in Paris. The skulls arrive in Madagascar on 1 September.

=== September ===
- 25 September – 2025 Malagasy protests: A night-time curfew is imposed in Antananarivo following protests and riots against shortages of water and electricity.
- 26 September – President Rajoelina dismisses his energy minister amid protests against electricity shortages.
- 27 September – The Mantadia and Tsimembo nature reserves are designated as biosphere reserves by UNESCO.
- 29 September – President Rajoelina dissolves the government amid the protests against water and electricity shortages that resulted in at least 22 deaths.

=== October ===
- 6 October – President Rajoelina appoints general Ruphin Zafisambo as prime minister.
- 8 October – President Rajoelina announces plans for a “national dialogue” involving spiritual leaders, students, and youth representatives to address public grievances.
- 12 October – President Rajoelina announces a military coup against his government.
- 13 October – President Rajoelina announces that he has fled Madagascar following an assassination attempt against him.
- 14 October – 2025 Madagascar coup d'état: President Rajoelina dissolves the National Assembly in an attempt to avoid an impeachment motion. Despite this, the chamber proceeds to remove Rajoelina by 130 votes to one blank vote, after which the military announces the formation of a junta along with the National Gendarmerie led by CAPSAT commander Colonel Michael Randrianirina.
- 15 October – 2025 Madagascar coup d'état: Madagascar is suspended as a member of the African Union.
- 17 October – Colonel Michael Randrianirina is inaugurated as interim president.
- 20 October – President Randrianirina appoints Herintsalama Rajaonarivelo as Prime Minister.
- 25 October – The new government strips former president Rajoelina of his Malagasy citizenship, citing laws against dual nationality.
- 28 October – The government names a mostly civilian cabinet, including Christine Razanamahasoa as foreign minister and Fanirisoa Ernaivo as justice minister.

== Holidays ==
- 1 January – New Year's Day
- 8 March – International Women's Day
- 29 March – Martyrs' Day
- 30 March – Eid al-Fitr
- 21 April – Easter Monday
- 1 May – Labour Day
- 29 May – Ascension Day
- 9 June – Whit Monday
- 6 June – Eid al-Adha
- 26 June – Independence Day
- 15 August – Assumption Day
- 1 November – All Saints' Day
- 25 December – Christmas Day

== Deaths ==
- 22 August – Céline Ratsiraka, 87, first lady (1975–1993, 1997–2002)

== See also ==
- 2024–25 South-West Indian Ocean cyclone season
- International Organization of Francophone countries (OIF)
