= COVID-19 pandemic in Madagascar =

- Disease: COVID-19
- Pathogen: SARS-CoV-2
- Location: Madagascar
- First outbreak: Wuhan, Hubei, China
- Index case: Antananarivo
- Arrival date: 13 March 2020 (6 years, 5 months and 1 day)
- Confirmed cases: 68,853 (updated 5 August 2026)
- Deaths: 1,428 (updated 5 August 2026)

The COVID-19 pandemic in Madagascar is part of the worldwide pandemic of coronavirus disease 2019 (COVID-19) caused by severe acute respiratory syndrome coronavirus 2 (SARS-CoV-2). On 20 March 2020, the first case in Madagascar was confirmed in Antananarivo.

== Background ==
On 12 January 2020, the World Health Organization (WHO) confirmed that a novel coronavirus was the cause of a respiratory illness in a cluster of people in Wuhan City, Hubei Province, China, which was reported to the WHO on 31 December 2019. The case fatality ratio for COVID-19 has been much lower than SARS of 2003, but the transmission has been significantly greater, with a significant total death toll. Model-based simulations for Madagascar indicate that the 95% confidence interval for the time-varying reproduction number R_{t} has been stable around 1.0 since November 2020.

== Timeline ==
=== March 2020 ===
- On 20 March, the first three cases were confirmed in Antananarivo, the capital of Madagascar. All three cases were women.
- During March 57 persons tested positive. All 57 cases were active at the end of the month.

=== April to June 2020 ===
- By 22 April, Madagascar had reported 121 cases but no deaths.
- During April 71 persons tested positive. The number of confirmed cases since the start of the outbreak reached 128. The number of active cases at the end of the month was 36, a decrease by 37% from March.
- On 5 May, Madagascar reported a total of 149 cases but no deaths. The first death was recorded on 16 May. The deceased was an unnamed 57-year-old medical worker who had diabetes and high blood pressure.
- During the month 643 persons tested positive. The number of confirmed cases since the start of the outbreak reached 771. The number of active cases at the end of the month was 597, an increase by 561 persons from April. Six persons died from COVID-19 in May.
- As of 2 June, the European Centre for Disease Prevention and Control had recorded 6 COVID-19 related deaths in Madagascar.
- The pandemic has been blamed for an early and fiercer than normal fire season as citizens deprived of tourism revenue turn to the forests.
- During the month 1443 persons tested positive, bringing the total number of confirmed cases since the start of the outbreak to 2214. There were 1200 active cases at the end of June, more than twice the number at the end of May. The death toll increased by 14 to 20.

=== July to September 2020 ===
- By 12 July, a total of 4,867 positive cases had been recorded, more than double the total at the end of June. On 7 July, a lockdown was reimposed in the central region to deal with the surge in cases.
- In July there were 8,654 new cases, raising the total number of confirmed cases to 10,868. The death toll rose to 106. The number of recovered patients reached 7,807 while 2,955 cases remained active at the end of the month.
- There were 3,995 new cases in August, raising the total number of confirmed cases to 14,863. The death toll rose to 192. There were 839 active cases at the end of the month.
- There were 1,514 new cases in September, bringing the total number of confirmed cases to 16,377. The death toll rose to 229. The number of recovered patients increased to 15,139, leaving 1,009 active cases at the end of the month.

=== October to December 2020 ===
- There were 734 new cases in October, bringing the total number of confirmed cases to 17,111. The death toll rose to 244. There were 458 active cases at the end of the month.
- There were 230 new cases in November, bringing the total number of confirmed cases to 17,341. The death toll rose to 251. There were 433 active cases at the end of the month.
- There were 373 new cases in December, taking the total number of confirmed cases to 17,714. The death toll rose to 261. There were 225 active cases at the end of the month.

=== January to March 2021 ===
- There were 1,351 new cases in January, taking the total number of confirmed cases to 19,065. The death toll rose to 281. There were 569 active cases at the end of the month.
- There were 766 new cases in February, taking the total number of confirmed cases to 19,831. The death toll rose to 297. There were 238 active cases at the end of the month.
- There were 4,865 new cases in March, taking the total number of confirmed cases to 24,696. The death toll rose to 433. There were 2,131 active cases at the end of the month.

=== April to June 2021 ===
- There were 12,318 new cases in April, taking the total number of confirmed cases to 37,014. The death toll rose to 643. There were 4,801 active cases at the end of the month.
- Madagascar received 250,000 doses of the Oxford–AstraZeneca COVID-19 vaccine on 8 May courtesy of COVAX. Vaccinations started two days later. There were 4,328 new cases in May, taking the total number of confirmed cases to 41,342. The death toll rose to 840. There were 140 active cases at the end of the month.
- There were 960 new cases in June, taking the total number of confirmed cases to 42,302. The death toll rose to 918. There were 674 active cases at the end of the month.

=== July to September 2021 ===
- There were 433 new cases in July, taking the total number of confirmed cases to 42,735. The death toll rose to 947. There were 577 active cases at the end of the month.
- There were 134 new cases in August, taking the total number of confirmed cases to 42,869. The death toll rose to 956. There were 619 active cases at the end of the month.
- There were 728 new cases in September, taking the total number of confirmed cases to 43,597. The death toll rose to 960. The number of recovered patients increased to 42,637, leaving no active cases at the end of the month.

=== October to December 2021 ===
- There were 29 new cases in October, taking the total number of confirmed cases to 43,626. The death toll rose to 963. The number of recovered patients increased to 42,663, leaving no active cases at the end of the month.
- There were 704 new cases in November, taking the total number of confirmed cases to 44,330. The death toll rose to 967. The number of recovered patients increased to 42,915, leaving 448 active cases at the end of the month.
- There were 8,104 new cases in December, raising the total number of confirmed cases to 52,434. The death toll rose to 1,067. The number of recovered patients increased to 45,985, leaving 5,382 active cases at the end of the month. Modelling by WHO's Regional Office for Africa suggests that due to under-reporting, the true number of infections by the end of 2021 was around 12.3 million while the true number of COVID-19 deaths was around 9,822.

=== January to March 2022 ===
- There were 6,885 new cases in January, raising the total number of confirmed cases to 59,319. The death toll rose to 1,274. The number of recovered patients increased to 53,582, leaving 4,463 active cases at the end of the month.
- There were 4,340 new cases in February, raising the total number of confirmed cases to 63,659. The death toll rose to 1,366. The number of recovered patients increased to 58,677, leaving 3,616 active cases at the end of the month.
- There were 350 new cases in March, bringing the total number of confirmed cases to 64,009. The death toll rose to 1,384. The number of recovered patients increased to 59,280, leaving 3,345 active cases at the end of the month.

=== April to June 2022 ===
- There were 172 new cases in April, raising the total number of confirmed cases to 64,181. The death toll rose to 1,391. The number of recovered patients increased to 59,370, leaving 3,420 active cases at the end of the month.
- There were 196 new cases in May, raising the total number of confirmed cases to 64,377. The death toll rose to 1,395.
- There were 1,410 new cases in June, raising the total number of confirmed cases to 65,787. The death toll rose to 1,401. The number of recovered patients increased to 63,540, leaving 846 active cases at the end of the month.

=== July to September 2022 ===
- There were 704 new cases in July, raising the total number of confirmed cases to 66,491. The death toll rose to 1,408.
- There were 135 new cases in August, taking the total number of confirmed cases to 66,626. The death toll rose to 1,410.
- There were 50 new cases in September, taking the total number of confirmed cases to 66,676. The death toll remained unchanged.

=== October to December 2022 ===
- There were 73 new cases in October, raising the total number of confirmed cases to 66,749. The death toll rose to 1,411.
- There were 510 new cases in November, raising the total number of confirmed cases to 67,259. The death toll rose to 1,412.
- There were 491 new cases in December, raising the total number of confirmed cases to 67,750. The death toll rose to 1,418.

=== January to December 2023 ===
- There were 736 confirmed cases in 2023, bringing the total number of cases to 68,486. The death toll rose to 1,426.

== Prevention measures ==
Lockdowns were implemented in at least two cities. The government announced on 17 March that all international and regional flights would be suspended for 30 days starting 20 March.

Due to the crisis, a lack of international tourists caused problems for the tourism industry. Ambatovy mine suspended operations. The Central Bank of Madagascar injected hundreds of billions of ariary into the banking system to ease the economic damage caused by COVID-19.

On 20 April 2020, Madagascar President Andry Rajoelina officially launched a coronavirus "cure" dubbed "Covid-Organic". Developed by the Madagascar Institute of Applied Research (MIAR), the herbal tea was made using artemisia and other locally sourced herbs. Soldiers were dispatched to hand out batches of "Covid-Organic", with Colonel Willy Ratovondrainy announcing on state television that the tea would "strengthen immunity". However, the National Academy of Medicine of Madagascar (ANAMEM) voiced its skepticism, while the World Health Organization (WHO) cautioned that there was no proof for any coronavirus cure at the time of Covid-Organic's launch. The African Union has entered into discussions with the Malagasy government to test the drug's safety and efficiency.

In the central region including Antananarivo, a lockdown was imposed from 6 to 20 July 2020 in response to a spike in new cases in the capital.

== See also ==
- COVID-19 pandemic in Africa
- COVID-19 pandemic by country and territory
