= History of Madagascar =

The history of Madagascar started from the ancient supercontinent of Pangaea, containing amongst others the African continent and the Indian subcontinent, and by the island's late colonization by human settlers from South Borneo, Indonesia and from East Africa. These two factors facilitated the evolution and survival of thousands of endemic plant and animal species, some of which have gone extinct or are currently threatened with extinction. Trade in the Indian Ocean at the time of first colonization of Madagascar was dominated by Indonesian ships, probably of Borobudur ship and K'un-lun po types.

Over two thousand years, the island has received waves of settlers of diverse origins, primarily Austronesian and Bantu. Centuries of intermarriages between both groups created the Malagasy people, who are roughly an equal mixture of both groups. They speak Malagasy, an Austronesian language with Bantu, French and Arabic influences.

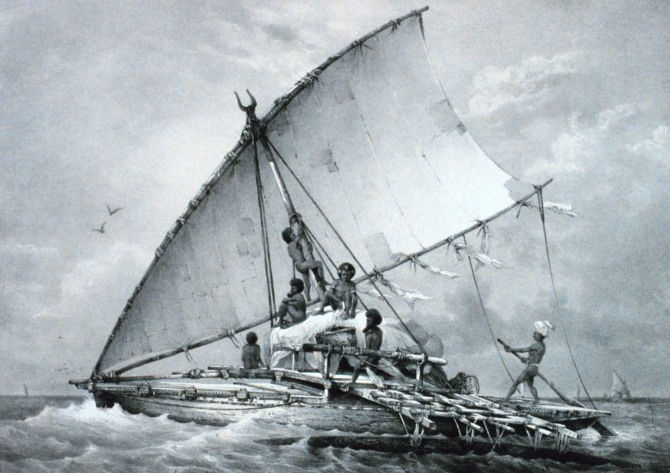
An Austronesian outrigger canoe; Malagasy vahoaka "people" is from Proto-Malayo-Polynesian *va-waka "people of the canoe". The Vahoaka Ntaolo, the first Austronesian ancestors of the Malagasy, probably used similar canoes to reach the great island from Indonesia

By the Middle Ages, over a dozen distinct ethnic identities had emerged on the island, typified by rule under a local chieftain. Some communities, such as the Sakalava, Merina and Betsimisaraka, were unified by leaders who established kingdoms, which gained wealth and power through commerce with Europeans and Arabs. Between the 16th and 18th centuries, pirate activity in the coastal areas of Madagascar was common. The Sakalava and Merina kingdoms in particular exploited European trade to strengthen the power of their kingdoms, trading Malagasy slaves for European firearms and other goods. Beginning in the early 19th century, the British and French competed for influence in Madagascar.

By the turn of the 19th century, King Andrianampoinimerina had reunited the highly populous Kingdom of Imerina in the central highlands, with its capital at Antananarivo. His son Radama I the Great expanded its authority to the island's other polities and was the first Malagasy sovereign to be recognized by foreign states as the ruler of the greater Merina Kingdom. During the rule of Queen Ranavalona I (r. 1828–1861), the kingdom was further expanded to encompass most of the island. Madagascar's population is estimated to have declined by half from 5 million to 2.5 million between 1833 and 1839 from war, disease, slavery, and other violence. She also attempted to eradicate European and Christian influence in the country.

Christianity was made the state religion under Queen Ranavalona II (r. 1868–1883). In the 1880s, Britain recognised France's authority on the island. This led in 1890 to the Malagasy Protectorate, which was however rejected by the Kingdom of Madagascar, which led to the two Franco-Hova Wars which ended with France capturing the capital in September 1895. Conflict continued in the Menalamba rebellion against French rule that was defeated in 1897. The monarchy was dissolved, and the queen was exiled. Following conquest, the French abolished slavery in 1896, freeing approximately 500,000 slaves.

During French rule, Malagasy people were required to fulfill corvée labor on French-run plantations while access to education or skilled positions were limited, although basic services like schools and clinics were extended across the island. Several militant nationalist secret societies emerged in opposition to French rule, of which the most prominent was Vy Vato Sakelika formed in 1913. Many Malagasy were conscripted to fight for France during the First (1914–1918) and Second World Wars (1939–1945), and during the latter Madagascar came under Vichy French control before being captured by the British in the Battle of Madagascar and returned to Free French control in 1942. In 1944, Madagascar became an overseas territory with representatives in the French National Assembly. Militant nationalists launched a large uprising in 1947 that was brutally suppressed by 1949.

The country gained full independence from France in 1960. Madagascar's First Republic (1960–1972) was established as a democratic system modeled on that of France and led by President Philibert Tsiranana. Popular unrest led to the socialist Democratic Republic of Madagascar under Admiral Didier Ratsiraka (1975–1992) distinguished by economic isolationism and political alliances with pro-Soviet states. By 1992, free and fair multiparty elections were held, ushering in the democratic Third Republic (1992–2009). Under the new constitution, the Malagasy public elected successive presidents Albert Zafy, Didier Ratsiraka, and Marc Ravalomanana. This latter was ousted in the 2009 Malagasy political crisis by a popular movement under the leadership of Andry Rajoelina. Elections were held on December 20, 2013, to elect a new president and return the country to constitutional governance.

== First inhabitants and settlements (500 BCE–700 CE) ==
=== Archaeological evidence for date of first settlement ===
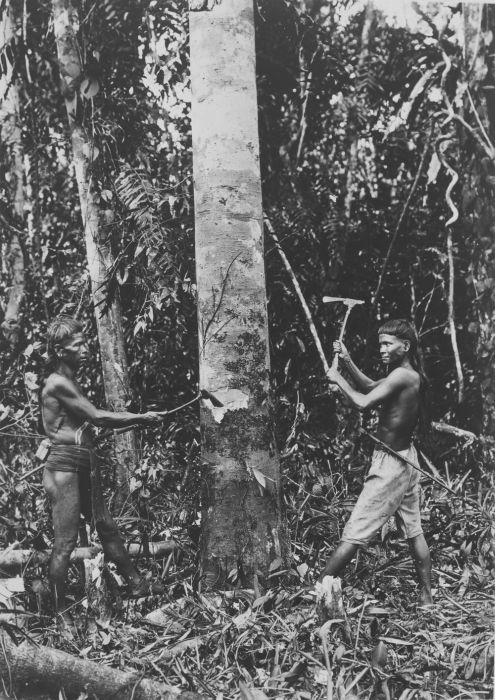
Vaγimba- "Those of the forest" in Proto–Southeast Barito, the reconstructed ancestor of the Southeast Barito languages, which includes the languages spoken by the Dayak peoples of the Barito River in Borneo (pictured)

The earliest unambiguous evidence of continuous human presence in Madagascar was found at Andavakoera and dates to 490 CE, and there is no archaeological evidence for human occupation in the highlands until around 1200. However, there is scattered evidence for much earlier human visits.

In 2009, archaeological excavations at Christmas River (south-central Madagascar) by Pat Wright and James Hansford located a purported elephant bird kill site, with bones showing human cut marks. These were dated to 8,500 BCE, but as yet there is no indication as to the identity of the hunters. Archaeological finds such as cut marks on bones found in the northwest and stone tools in the northeast indicate that Madagascar was visited by foragers around 2000 BCE.

There is potential evidence in the form of a cutmarked subfossil lemur bone from a palaeontological site, Taolambiby, in the southwest. One date was obtained, calibrated 530 to 300 BC (Godfrey & Jungers 2003). The cutmarking looks plausible, but there is a potential problem of old carbon from the limestone landscape compromising the date, and there are no associated artifacts or archaeological sites in the vicinity. Nearly contemporaneous potential evidence comes from cannabis or humulus pollen which occurs in a pollen column from the central highlands at an interpolated date of c. 2200 Before Present (BP). There is a hypothesis that cannabis may have reached Africa 3000 years ago.

Finally, a cutmarked pygmy hippo bone from Ambolisatra has been dated and calibrated to between 60 BC and 130 AD (2 SDs), but it is from a coastal swamp without indications of settlement in a heavily karstic region. Moreover, a similar bone from the same collection from a nearby site gave two widely divergent dates of 2020 and 3495 BC (MacPhee & Burney 1991). Transient visits to Madagascar that did not result in enduring settlement cannot be ruled out, and may have left some traces.

=== A common Austronesian origin: The Vahoaka Ntaolo ===
Factual information about the peopling of Madagascar remains incomplete, but much recent multidisciplinary research and work in archaeology, genetics, linguistics, and history confirms that the Malagasy people were originally and overwhelmingly Austronesian peoples native to the Sunda Islands. They probably arrived on the west coast of Madagascar with outrigger canoes (waka) at the beginning of our era or as much as 300 years sooner according to archaeologists, and perhaps even earlier under certain geneticists' assumptions. On the basis of plant cultigens, Blench proposed the migrations occurred "at the earliest century BCE". Archaeological work of Ardika and Bellwood suggests migration between 500 and 200 BCE.

The Borobudur Ship Expedition in 2003–2004 confirmed scholars' ideas that ships from ancient Indonesia may have reached Madagascar and the West African coast for trade as early as the 8th century. Samudra Raksa, a traditional Borobudur ship with outriggers, was reconstructed and sailed in this expedition from Jakarta to Madagascar and Ghana. As for the ancient route, one possibility is that Indonesian Austronesians came directly across the Indian Ocean from Java to Madagascar. It is likely that they went through the Maldives, where evidence of old Indonesian boat design and fishing technology persists until the present. The Malagasy language originated from the Southeast Barito language, and the Ma'anyan language is its closest relative, with numerous Malay and Javanese loanwords. It is known that Ma'anyan people were brought as laborers and slaves by Malay and Javanese people in their trading fleets, which reached Madagascar by ca. 50–500 AD. These pioneers are known in the Malagasy oral tradition as the Ntaolo, from Proto-Malayo-Polynesian *tau-ulu, literally 'first men', from *tau, 'man', and *ulu, 'head; first; origin, beginning. It is likely that those ancient people called themselves *va-waka, "the canoe people" from Proto-Malayo-Polynesian *va, 'people', and *waka 'canoe'. Today the term vahoaka means 'people' in Malagasy.

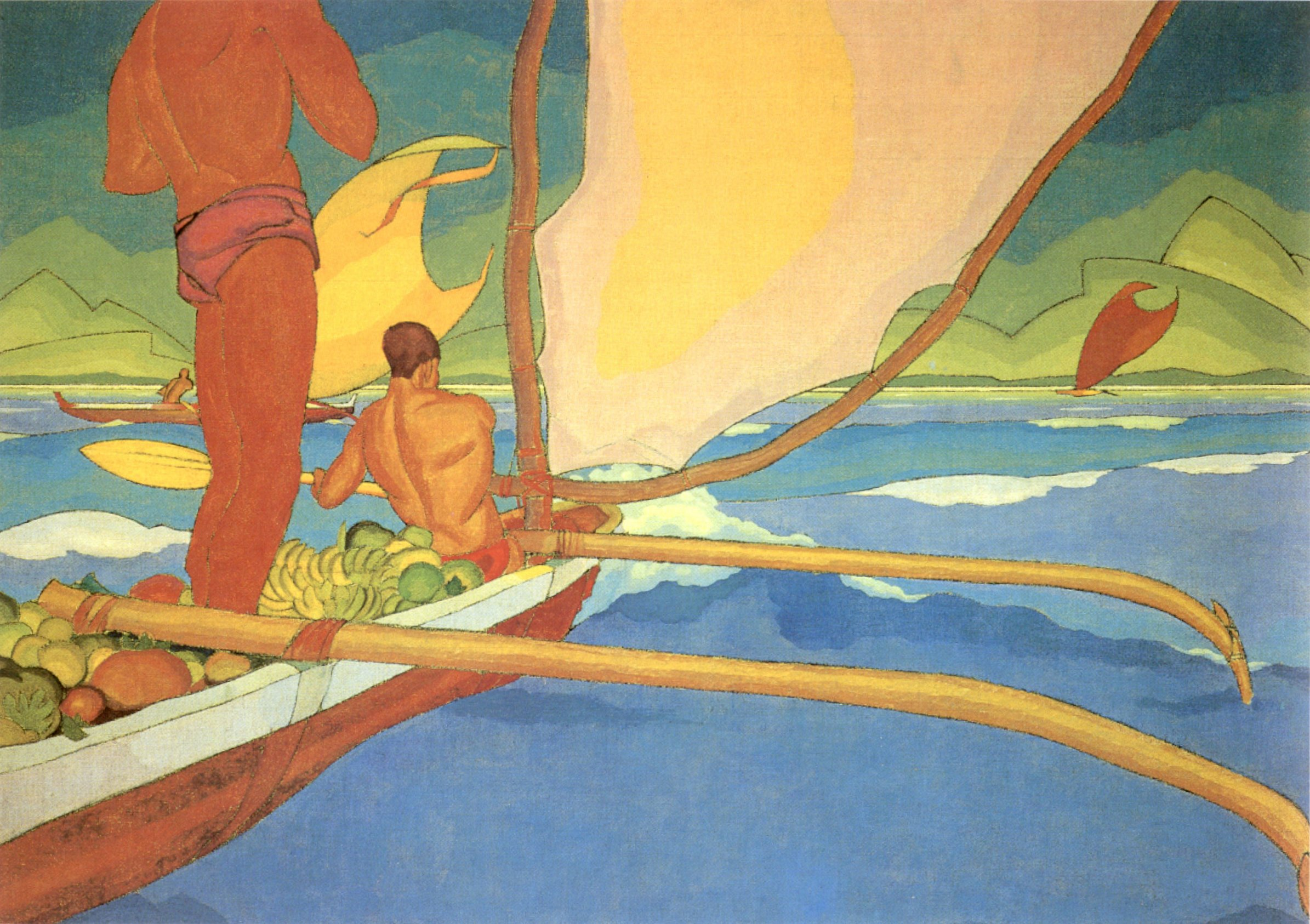
Men in an Outrigger Canoe Headed for Shore, an oil painting by Arman Manookian depicting the Vezo people, c. 1929

The Southeast Asian origin of the first Malagasy people explains certain features common among the Malagasy, for instance, the epicanthic fold common among all Malagasy, regardless of coastal or highlands origin or skin color. This original population (vahoaka ntaolo) can be called the "proto-Malagasy". They are the source of:

- the Malagasy language, common to the whole island, which shares many common roots with the Austronesian languages of Barito subgroup, which originated in South Kalimantan, such as Ma'anyan.
- Malagasy cultural traditions shared with Taiwanese indigenous peoples, as well as those of the Pacific Islands, Indonesia, New Zealand, and the Philippines, including ancient customs, such as burying the dead within a canoe in the sea or in a lake, the cultivation of traditional Austronesian crops such as taro or saonjo, banana, coconut, and sugarcane, traditional architecture with a square house plan, music and musical instruments such as the antsiva conch, the hazolahy drum, the atranatrana xylophone, sodina flute, or the valiha tube zither, and dance, including the "bird dance" found both in central and southern regions.

As for the cause of the arrival of these Austronesians, the history of the Indian Ocean from the early first millennium remains poorly understood. Madagascar may have played an important role in the trade of spices (especially cinnamon and cassia) and timber between Southeast Asia and the Middle East, directly or through the African coast and Madagascar.

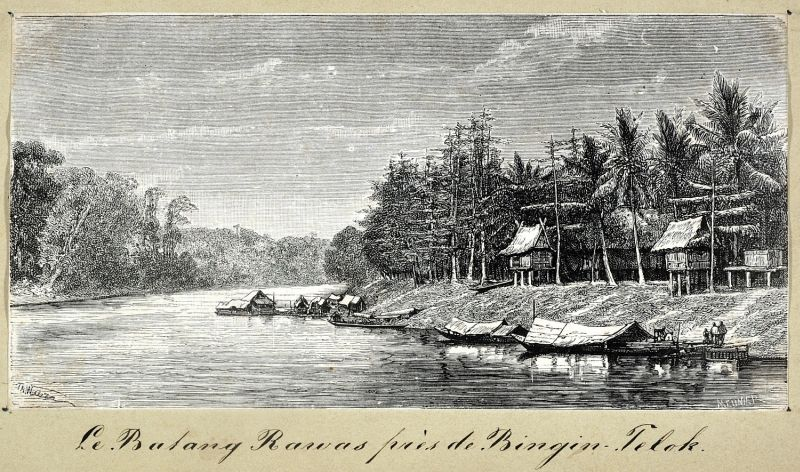
A Sumatran village showing several traditional houses (Malagasy levu). The vahoaka ntaolo villages of Madagascar were probably similar in the first millennium AD. This model is still currently present on every coast and in the remote inland areas and forests.

=== Vazimba and Vezo ===
The first known concentrated population of human settlers emerged along the southeastern coast of the island, although the first landfall may have been made on the northern coast. Upon arrival, early settlers practiced tavy (slash-and-burn agriculture) to clear the virgin coastal rainforests for the cultivation of their crops. The first settlers encountered Madagascar's wealth of megafauna, including giant lemurs, elephant birds, giant fossa and the Malagasy hippopotamus, which have since become extinct due to hunting and habitat destruction.

By 600, groups of these early settlers had moved inland and began clearing the forests of the central highlands (Imerina), where they particularly planted taro (saonjo) and probably rice (vary). These Vahoaka Ntaolo, hunters-gatherers and farmers, who decided to settle "in the forest", especially in the forests of the central highlands are known by the tradition as the Vazimba (from *ba/va-yimba- 'those of the forest', from *yimba- 'forest' in Proto–Southeast Barito, today barimba or orang rimba in Malay). Rafandrana, an ancestor of the Merina royal dynasty, for example, is known to have been a Vazimba. Rafohy and Rangita, the two founding queens of the Merina royalty, were also called Vazimbas.

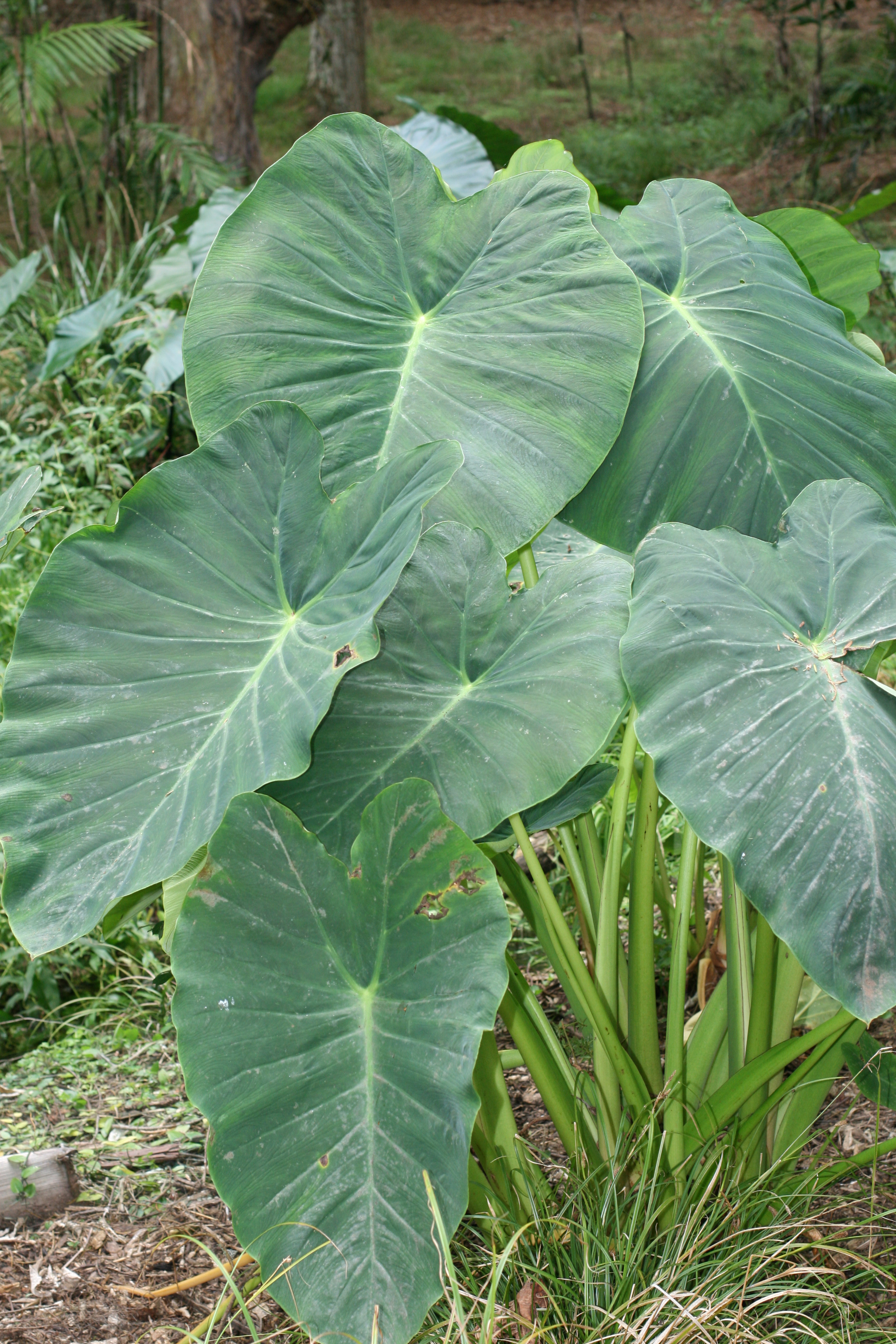
The taro (saonjo in Malagasy) is, according to an old Malagasy proverb, "the elder of the rice" (Ny saonjo no zokin'ny vary), and was also a staple diet for the proto-Austronesians

On the other side, the fishermen who, from the beginning, remained on the southwestern coast (probably the coasts of the first landing) were, according to the linguists, probably originally called the Vezo (from *ba/va/be/ve-jau – "those of the coast", borrowed from Proto-Malayo-Javanese, today veju in Bugis, bejau in Malay, and bajo in Javanese), which today is still the name of a Southwestern tribe.

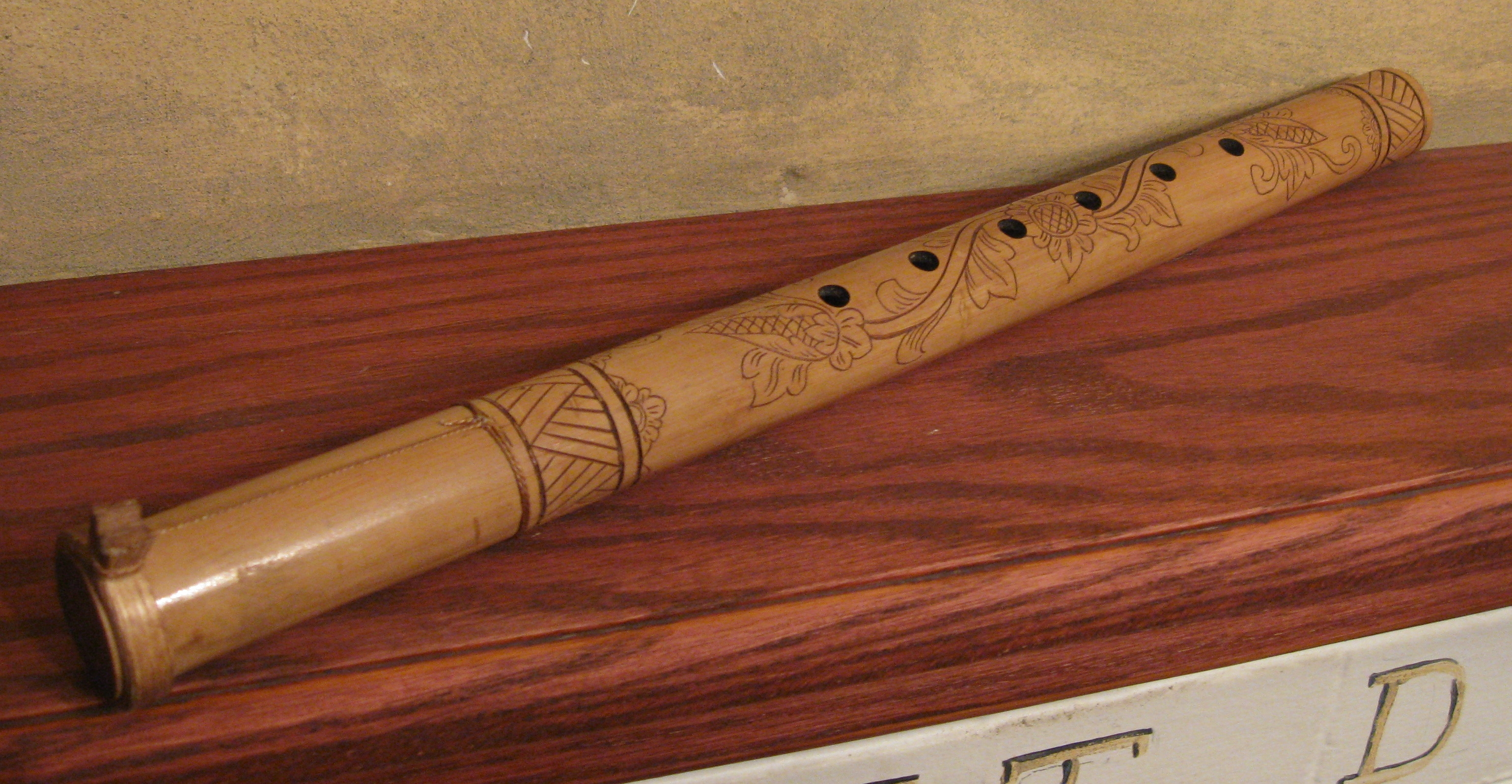
The suling is an Indonesian cousin of the sodina

After the arrival of the newcomers (see below), as growing population density necessitated higher crop yields, irrigated rice paddies emerged in Betsileo country by 1600 and were complemented with terraced paddies throughout the central highlands a century later. Zebu were introduced around 1000 by Bantu-speaking migrants from the African Great Lakes region (see below), who maintained large herds. The rising intensity of land cultivation and the ever-increasing demand for zebu pasturage in the central highlands had largely transformed the region from a forest ecosystem to barren grassland by the 17th century.

== Traders, explorers, and immigration (700–1500) ==
By the mid-first millennium (ca 700) until about 1500, the inner Vazimbas as much as the coastal Vezos clans welcomed new visitors or immigrants. These goods and/or slave traders came from the Middle East (Shirazi Persians, Omani Arabs, Arabized Jews), Africa (East African Bantus), and from Asia (Gujaratis, Malays, Javanese, Bugis). They were sometimes integrated within the coastal Vezos and the inner Vazimba clans.

=== Neo-Austronesians: Malays, Javanese, Bugis, and Orang Laut ===
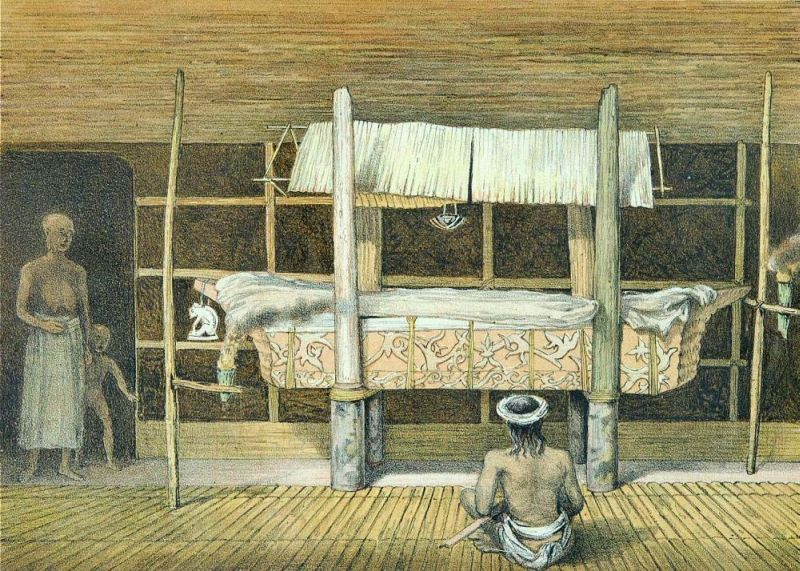
Canoe-sarcophagus of the Dayak: a burial that recalls the Malagasy tradition that former Ntaolo Vazimba and Vezo buried their dead in canoe-sarcophagi in the sea or in a lake

According to oral tradition, new Austronesian clans (Malays, Javanese, Bugis, and Orang Laut), historically referred to in general, regardless of their native island, as the "Hova" (from Old Bugis uwa, "commoner") landed in the north-west and east coast of the island. Adelaar's observations of Old Malay (Sanskritised), Old Javanese (Sanskritised) and Old Bugis borrowings in the initial Proto-Southeast-Barito language indicate that the first Hova waves came probably in the 7th century at the earliest. Marre and Dahl pointed out that the number of Sanskrit words in Malagasy is very limited compared with the large number now found in Indonesian languages, which means that the Indonesian settlers must have come at an early stage of Hindu influence, that is ca. 400 AD.

The Hova were probably derived from Indonesian thalassocracies. Their leaders were known as the diana in the Southeast and andriana or raondriana in the Center and the West (from (ra)-hadi-an, "lord" or "master" in Old Javanese, modern Javanese raden, also found in the Bugis noble title andi and the Tagalog word for "king" hari). They for the most part allied with Vazimba clans:

- In the Northwest area of the current Ankoala (from kuala, "estuary" in Malay and Indonesian) where the Hova Orang Laut (Antalaotra in Malagasy) had probably established their base for their Indian Ocean operations.
- On the east coast (Betsimisaraka) where the Hova leaders were also called Filo (ha) be by the "neo-Vezo" clans.
- In the southeast where the leaders ("Diana") of the Zafiraminia and Zafikazimambo clans allied with the "neo-Vezo" and founded the later Antaisaka, Antaimoro and Antambahoaka kingdoms.
- In the west: the Maroserana dynasty which founded the Sakalava Kingdom is itself a result of Zafiraminia on the east coast.
- In the Center where repeated alliances among the Hova leaders (the andriana) (such as Andrianerinerina, Andriantomara and their descendants) with the chiefs of Vazimba clans (such as Rafandrana and his descendants) led to the Merina and Betsileo Kingdoms.

With the arrival of Islam, Persian, Arab, and Swahili traders soon supplanted the Indonesians on the coast of Africa and eventually extended control over the Comoro Islands and parts of the coast of Madagascar. Meanwhile, with competition in the new joint naval powers of Song China and Chola South India, the thalassocracies of Indonesia were in rapid decline, though the Portuguese still encountered Javanese sailors in Madagascar in the sixteenth century.

=== East African Bantus ===
There is archaeological evidence that Bantu peoples, agro-pastoralists from East Africa, may have begun migrating to the island as early as the 6th and 7th centuries. Other historical and archaeological records suggest that some of the Bantus were descendants of Swahili sailors and merchants who used dhows to traverse the seas to the western shores of Madagascar. Finally, some sources theorize that during the Middle Ages, Arab, Persian and Neo-Austronesian slave-traders brought Bantu people to Madagascar, transported by Swahili merchants to feed foreign demand for slaves. Years of intermarriages with other peoples of the island created the Malagasy peoples, who primarily speak Malagasy, an Austronesian language with Bantu influences. There are consequently many (Proto-)Swahili borrowings in the initial Proto-SEB Malagasy language. This substratum is especially significantly present in the domestic and agricultural vocabulary (e.g. omby or aombe, "beef", from Swahili ng'ombe; tongolo "onion" from Swahili kitunguu; Malagasy nongo "pot" from nunggu in Swahili).

=== Arabs ===
The written history of Madagascar begins in the 7th century when Omanis established trading posts along the northwest coast and introduced Islam, the Arabic script (used to transcribe the Malagasy language in a form of writing known as the sorabe alphabet), Arab astrology and other cultural elements. During this early period, Madagascar served as an important transoceanic trading port for the East African coast that gave Africa a trade route to the Silk Road and served simultaneously as a port for incoming ships.

According to the traditions of some Malagasy peoples, the first Bantus and Arabs to settle in Madagascar came as refugees from the civil wars that followed the death of Muhammad in 632.^{[improper citation]} Beginning in the 10th or 11th century, Arab and traders worked their way down the Swahili coast in their dhows and established settlements on the west coast of Madagascar. Notably they included the Zafiraminia, traditional ancestors of the Antemoro, Antanosy and other east coast ethnicities. The last wave of Arab immigrants, the Antalaotra, immigrated from Swahili colonies. They settled the northwest of the island (the Mahajanga area) and introduced, for the first time, Islam to Madagascar.^{[improper citation]}

Arab immigrants, though few in number compared to the native Austronesians and Bantus, nevertheless left a lasting impression. The Malagasy names for seasons, months, days, and coins in certain regions have Arabic origins, as do cultural features such as the practice of circumcision, the communal grain-pool, and different forms of salutation (such as salama).

=== Europeans (from 1500) ===
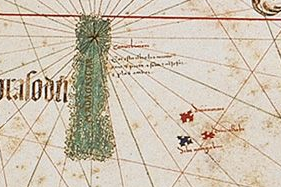
Map of Madagascar and the Mascarene Islands (1502)

Europe knew of Madagascar through Arab sources; thus The Travels of Marco Polo claimed that "the inhabitants are Saracens, or followers of the law of Mohammed", without mentioning other inhabitants. Other than its size and location, everything about the island in the book describes southeastern Africa, not Madagascar. European contact began on 10 August 1500, when the Portuguese sea captain Diogo Dias sighted the island after his ship separated from a fleet going to India. The Portuguese traded with the islanders and named the island São Lourenço (Saint Lawrence). In 1666, François Caron, the director general of the newly formed Louis XIV's East India Company, sailed to Madagascar. The company failed to establish a colony on Madagascar but established ports on the nearby islands of Bourbon (now Réunion) and Isle de France (now Mauritius). In the late 17th century, the French established trading posts along the east coast. On Nosy Borah, a small island 12 miles (19 km) off the northeastern coast of Madagascar, Captain Misson and his pirate crew allegedly founded the famous pirate utopia of Libertatia in the late 17th century. From about 1774 to 1824, Madagascar was a favourite haunt for pirates. Many European sailors were shipwrecked on the coasts of the island, among them Robert Drury, whose journal is one of the few written depictions of life in southern Madagascar during the 18th century. Sailors sometimes called Madagascar "Island of the Moon".

==== European settlements ====
By the 15th century, Europeans had wrested control of the spice trade from the Muslims. They did this by bypassing the Middle East and sending their cargo ships around the Cape of Good Hope to India. The Portuguese mariner Diogo Dias became the first European to set foot on Madagascar when his ship, bound for India, blew off course in 1500. In the ensuing 200 years, the English and French tried (and failed) to establish settlements on the island.

Fever, dysentery, hostile Malagasy, and the trying arid climate of southern Madagascar soon terminated the English settlement near Toliara in 1646. Another English settlement in the north in Île Sainte-Marie came to an end in 1649. The French colony at Tôlanaro (Fort Dauphin) fared a little better: it lasted thirty years. On Christmas night 1672, local Antanosy tribesmen, perhaps angry because fourteen French soldiers in the fort had recently divorced their Malagasy wives to marry fourteen French orphan-women sent out to the colony, massacred the fourteen grooms and thirteen of the fourteen brides. The Antanosy then besieged the stockade at Tôlanaro for eighteen months. A ship of the French East India Company rescued the surviving thirty men and one widow in 1674.

==== Pirates and slave-traders ====
Map of Madagascar and surroundings, circa 1702–1707

Map of Madagascar and the western portion of the East Indies, circa 1702–1707

Between 1680 and 1725, Madagascar became a pirate stronghold. Many unfortunate sailors became shipwrecked and stranded on the island. Those who survived settled among the natives, or more often, found French or English colonies on the island, or even pirate havens, and thus became pirates themselves. One such case, that of Robert Drury, resulted in a journal giving one of the few written depictions of southern Madagascar in the 18th century.

Notable pirates, including William Kidd, Henry Every, John Bowen, and Thomas Tew, made Antongil Bay and Nosy Boraha their bases of operations. The pirates plundered merchant ships in the Indian Ocean, the Red Sea, and the Persian Gulf. They deprived Europe-bound ships of their silks, cloth, spices, and jewels. Vessels captured while travelling in the opposite direction (to India) lost their cargo, including coin, gold, and silver. The pirates robbed the Indian cargo ships that traded between ports in the Indian Ocean as well as ships commissioned by the East India Companies of France, England, and the Netherlands. The pilgrim fleet sailing between Surat in India and Mokha on the tip of the Arabian Peninsula was a favourite target, because the wealthy Muslim pilgrims often carried jewels and other finery with them to Mecca. Merchants in India, various ports of Africa, and Réunion showed willingness to fence the pirates' stolen goods. The low-paid seamen who manned merchant ships in the Indian Ocean hardly put up a fight, seeing as they had little reason or motivation to risk their lives. The pirates often recruited crewmen from the ships they plundered.

With regard to piracy in Malagasy waters, note the (semi-)legendary accounts of the alleged pirate-state of Libertalia.

Prior to the arrival of the Europeans, certain Malagasy tribes occasionally waged wars to capture and enslave prisoners. They either sold the slaves to Arab traders or kept them on-hand as laborers. Following the arrival of European slavers, human slaves became more valuable, and the coastal tribes of Madagascar took to warring with each other to obtain prisoners for the lucrative slave-trade. Instead of spears and cutlasses, the tribesmen fought with muskets, musket balls, and gunpowder that they obtained from the Europeans, conducting fierce and brutal wars. On account of their relationship to the pirates, the Betsimisaraka in eastern Madagascar had more firearms than anyone else. They overpowered their neighbors, the Antankarana and Tsimihety, and even raided the Comoro Islands. As the tribe on the west coast with the most connections to the slave trade, the Sakalava people also had access to guns and powder.

Today, the people of Madagascar can be considered as the product of mixing between the first occupants, the vahoaka ntaolo Austronesians (Vazimba and Vezo) and those arrived later (Hova neo-Austronesians, Persians, Arabs, Africans and Europeans).

Genotypically, the original Austronesian heritage is more or less evenly distributed throughout the island. Researchers have noticed the "Polynesian motif" everywhere: an old marker of Austronesian populations from before the great immigration to the islands of Polynesia and Melanesia. This fact would require a common starting point among the Proto-Malagasy' vahoaka ntaolo' (who migrated west to Madagascar) and the ancestors of the current Polynesians (who left for the Pacific Islands in the East) between 500 BCE and 1 CE.

== Feudal era (1500–1895) ==
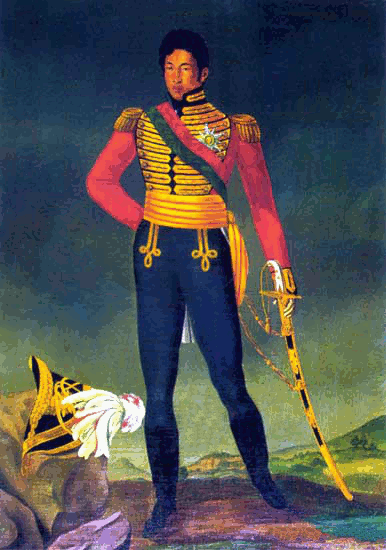
Radama I, the first monarch of the kingdom unified central Madagascar.

=== Rise of the great kingdoms ===
Those new immigrants of the Middle Ages were a minority in numbers, yet their cultural contributions, political and technological to the neo-Vazimba and neo-Vezo world substantially altered their society and is the cause of the major upheavals of the sixteenth century that led to the Malagasy feudal era.

On the coasts, the integration of the East Asians, Middle Easterns, Bantus and Portuguese led to the establishment of the kingdoms of the Antakarana, Boina, Menabe and Vezo on the west coast, the Mahafaly and Antandroy in the south, and the Antesaka, Antambahoaka, Antemoro, Antanala and Betsimisaraka on the east coast.

In the interior, the struggle for hegemony between the different Neo-Vazimba clans of central highlands, called the Hova by the coastal Neo-Vezo clans, led to the creation of the Merina, Betsileo, Bezanozano, Sihanaka, Tsimihety and Bara kingdoms.

The birth of these kingdoms/tribes essentially altered the political structure of the ancient world of the Vahoaka Ntaolo, but for the most part the common language, customs, traditions, religion and economy was preserved.

Among the Central Kingdoms, the most important were the Betsileo kingdoms (Fandriana, Fisakana, Manandriana, Isandra) to the south, and the Merina kingdoms to the north. These were definitively unified in the early 19th century by Andrianampoinimerina. His son and successor Radama I (reigning 1810–1828) opened his country to foreign influence. With the support of the British, he extended its authority over much of the island. From 1817, the central Merina kingdoms, Betsileo, Bezanozano, and Sihanaka, unified by Radama I were known to the outside world as the Kingdom of Madagascar.

=== Sakalava ===
The island's West clan chiefs began to extend their power through trade with their Indian Ocean neighbors, first with Arab, Persian and Somali traders who connected Madagascar with East Africa, the Middle East and India, and later with European slave traders. The wealth created in Madagascar through trade created a state system ruled by powerful regional monarchs known as the Maroserana. These monarchs adopted the cultural traditions of subjects in their territories and expanded their kingdoms. They took on divine status, and new nobility and artisan classes were created. Madagascar functioned as a contact port for the other Swahili seaport city-states such as Sofala, Kilwa, Mombasa and Zanzibar. By the Middle Ages, large chiefdoms began to dominate considerable areas of the island. Among these were the Betsimisaraka alliance of the eastern coast and the Sakalava chiefdoms of the Menabe (centered in what is now the town of Morondava) and of Boina (centered in what is now the provincial capital of Mahajanga). The influence of the Sakalava extended across what are now the provinces of Antsiranana, Mahajanga and Toliara.

The island's chiefs began to extend their power through trade with their Indian Ocean neighbours, notably East Africa, the Middle East and India. Large chiefdoms began to dominate considerable areas of the island. Among these were the Sakalava chiefdoms of the Menabe, centred in what is now the town of Morondava, and of Boina, centered in what is now the provincial capital of Mahajanga (Majunga). The influence of the Sakalava extended across what are now the provinces of Antsiranana, Mahajanga and Toliara.

According to local tradition, the founders of the Sakalava kingdom were Maroseraña (or Maroseranana, "those who owned many ports") princes, from the Fiherenana (now Toliara). They quickly subdued the neighbouring princes, starting with the southern ones, in the Mahafaly area. The true founder of Sakalava dominance was Andriamisara; his son Andriandahifotsy (c. 1610–1658) then extended his authority northwards, past the Mangoky River. His two sons, Andriamanetiarivo and Andriamandisoarivo, extended gains further up to the Tsongay region (now Mahajanga). At about that time, the empire's unity starts to split, resulting in a southern kingdom (Menabe) and a northern kingdom (Boina). Further splits resulted, despite continued extension of the Boina princes' reach into the extreme north, in Antankarana country.

The Sakalava rulers of this period are known through the memoirs of Europeans such as Robert Drury, James Cook, Barnvelt (1719), Valentyn (1726).

=== Merina monarchy ===
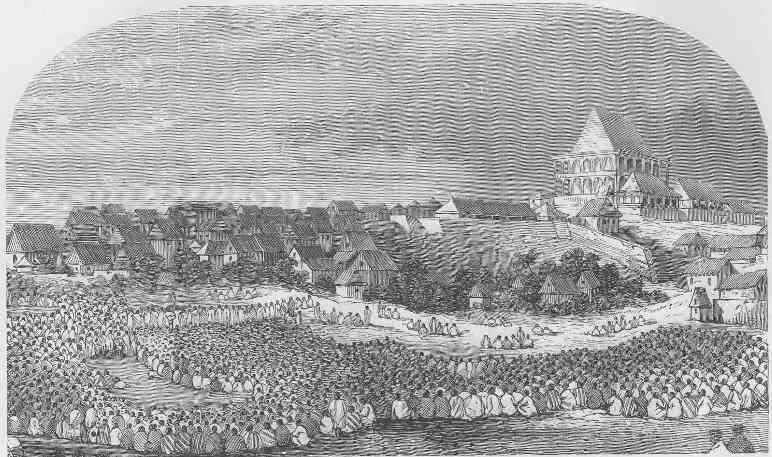
Madagascar—Gathering of The People for The Making of Laws (LMS, 1869, p.52)

King Andrianampoinimerina (1785–1810) and his son, Radama I (1810–1828) succeeded in uniting nearly all of Madagascar under Merina rule. These kings and their successors descended from a line of ancient Merina royalty who ruled the lands of Imerina in the central Highlands of Madagascar since at least the 16th century. Even prior to their eventual domination and unification of the entire island, the political and cultural activities of Merina royalty were to leave an indelible mark on contemporary Malagasy identity.

With the establishment of dominion over the greater part of the Highlands, Andrianampoinimerina became the first Merina monarch to be considered a king of Madagascar. The island continued to be ruled by a succession of Merina monarchs until the last of them, Ranavalona III, was deposed and exiled to Algeria by French forces who conquered and colonized the island in 1895.

==== King Andrianampoinimerina ====
Andrianampoinimerina, grandson of King Andriambelomasina and successor to his uncle King Andrianjafy, successfully reunited the fragmented Merina kingdom through a combination of diplomacy, strategic political marriages and successful military campaigns against rival princes. Andrianampoinimerina distinguished himself from other kings by codifying laws and supervising the building of dikes and trenches to increase the amount of arable land around his capital at Antananarivo in a successful bid to end the famines that had wracked Imerina for decades. The king ambitiously proclaimed: Ny ranomasina no valapariako (“the sea is the boundary of my rice-field”), and by the time of his death in 1810 he had conquered the Bara and Betsileo highland tribes, laying the groundwork for expansion of his kingdom to the shores of the island.

==== King Radama I (1810–1828) ====
Andrianampoinimerina's son Radama I (Radama the Great) assumed the throne during a turning-point in European history that had repercussions for Madagascar. With the defeat of Napoléon in 1814/1815, the balance of power in Europe and overseas shifted in Britain's favor. The British, eager to exert control over the trade routes of the Indian Ocean, had captured the islands of Réunion and Mauritius from the French in 1810. Although they returned Réunion to France, they kept Mauritius as a naval base which would maintain trade links throughout the British Empire. Mauritius's governor, in a bid to woo Madagascar from French control, recognized Radama I as King of Madagascar, a diplomatic maneuver meant to underscore the idea of the sovereignty of the island and thus to preclude claims by any European powers.

Radama I signed treaties with the United Kingdom outlawing the slave trade and admitting Protestant missionaries into Madagascar. As a result of these treaties Protestant missionaries from Britain would spread British influence in Madagascar; while outlawing the slave trade would weaken Réunion's economy by depriving the island of slave laborers for France's sugar plantations. In return for outlawing the slave trade, Madagascar received what the treaty called "The Equivalent": an annual sum of a thousand dollars in gold, another thousand in silver, stated amounts of gunpowder, flints, and muskets, plus 400 surplus British Army uniforms. The governor of Mauritius also sent military advisers who accompanied and sometimes led Merina soldiers in their battles against the Sakalava and Betsimisaraka. In 1824, having defeated the Betsimisaraka, Radama I declared, "Today, the whole island is mine! Madagascar has but one master." The king died in 1828 while leading his army on a punitive expedition against the Betsimisaraka.

==== Queen Ranavalona I (1828–1861) ====
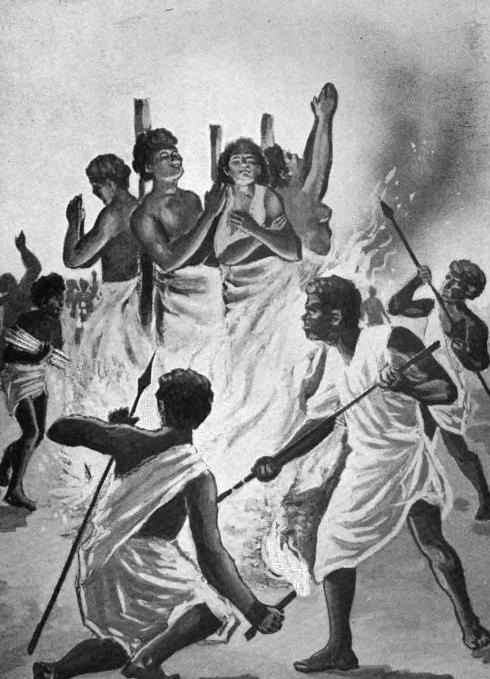
Christians burned at the stake by Ranavalona I

The 33-year reign of Queen Ranavalona I, the widow of Radama I, was characterized by an increase in the size of the Kingdom of Madagascar as it conquered neighboring states as well as an effort to maintain the cultural and political sovereignty of Madagascar in the face of increasing foreign influence. The queen repudiated the treaties that Radama I had signed with Britain and, in 1835 after issuing a royal edict prohibiting the practice of Christianity in Madagascar, she expelled British missionaries from the island and began persecuting Christian converts who would not renounce their religion. Malagasy Christians would remember this period as ny tany maizina, or "the time when the land was dark".

During her reign, constant warfare, disease, slave labor, and harsh measures of justice resulted in a high mortality rate among the Malagasy population; the population of the island is estimated to have declined by half from 5 million to 2.5 million between 1833 and 1839.

Unbeknownst to the queen, her son and heir, the crown-prince (the future Radama II), attended Roman Catholic masses in secret. The young man grew up under the influence of French nationals in Antananarivo. In 1854, he wrote a letter to Napoléon III inviting France to invade and uplift Madagascar. On 28 June 1855 he signed the Lambert Charter. This document gave Joseph-François Lambert, an enterprising French businessman who had arrived in Madagascar only three weeks before, the exclusive right to develop all minerals, forests, and unoccupied land in Madagascar in exchange for a 10-percent royalty payable to the Merina monarchy. In years to come, the French would show the Lambert Charter and the prince's letter to Napoléon III to explain the Franco-Hova Wars and the annexation of Madagascar as a colony. In 1857, the queen uncovered a plot by her son (the future Radama II) and French nationals in the capital to remove her from power. She immediately expelled all foreigners from Madagascar, sparing her son. Ranavalona died in 1861.

==== King Radama II (1861–1863) ====
In his brief two years on the throne, King Radama II re-opened trade with Mauritius and Réunion, invited Christian missionaries and foreigners to return to Madagascar, and re-instated most of Radama I's reforms. His liberal policies angered the aristocracy, however, and Rainivoninahitriniony, the prime minister, engineered a coup d'état in which Radama II was strangled to death.

==== Queen Rasoherina (1863–1868) ====
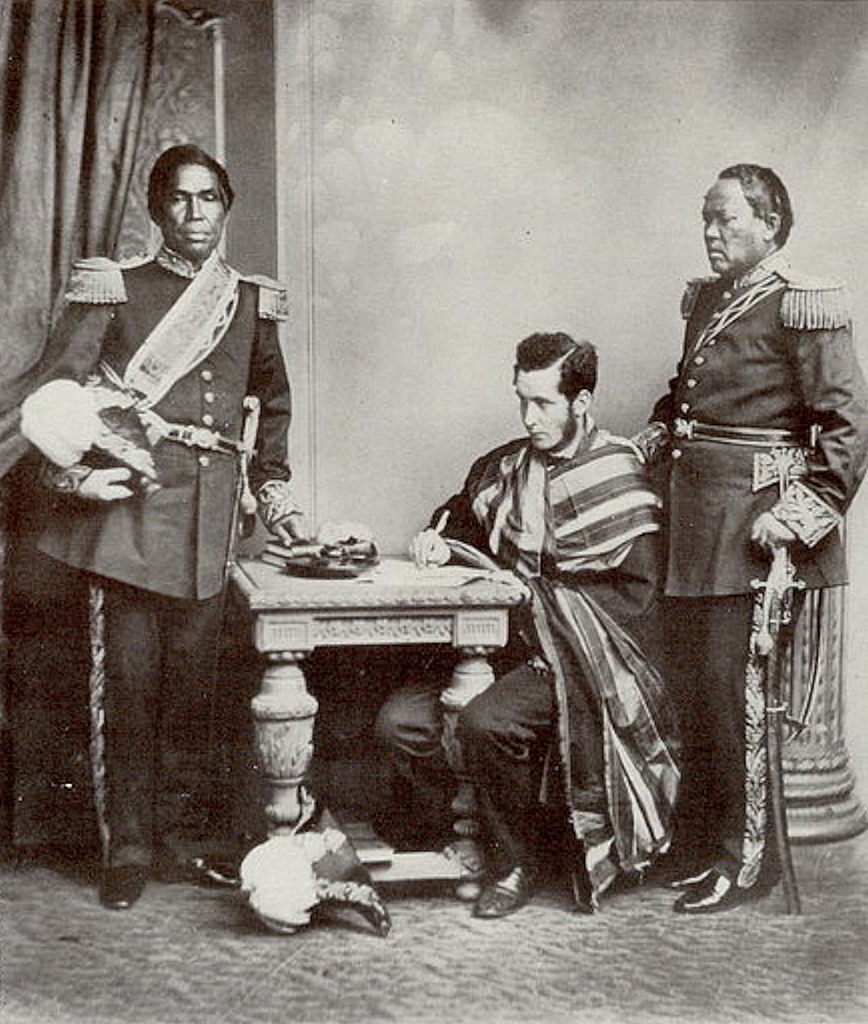
Malagasy Embassy to Europe in 1863. Left to right: Rainifiringa Ralaimaholy, Rev. John Duffus and Rasatranabo aka Rainandrianandraina.

A council of princes headed by Rainilaiarivony approached Rabodo, the widow of Radama II, the day after the death of her husband. They gave her the conditions under which she could succeed to the throne. These conditions included the suppression of trial by ordeal as well as the monarchy's defense of freedom of religion. Rabodo, crowned queen on 13 May 1863 under the throne name of Rasoherina, reigned until her death on 1 April 1868.

The Malagasy people remember Queen Rasoherina for sending ambassadors to London and Paris and for prohibiting Sunday markets. On 30 June 1865, she signed a treaty with the United Kingdom giving British citizens the right to rent land and property on the island and to have a resident ambassador. With the United States of America she signed a trade agreement that also limited the importation of weapons and the export of cattle. Finally, with France the queen signed a peace between her descendants and the descendants of the Emperor of France. Rasoherina married her prime minister, Rainivoninahitriniony, but public outcry against his involvement in the murder of Radama II soon forced his resignation and exile to Betsileo country south of Imerina. She then married his brother, Rainilaiarivony, head of the army at the time of Radama II's murder who was promoted to the post of Prime Minister upon the resignation and exile of his older brother. Rainilaiarivony would rule Madagascar from behind the scenes for the remaining 32 years of the Merina monarchy, marrying each of the final three queens of Madagascar in succession.

==== Queen Ranavalona II (1868–1883) ====
In 1869, Queen Ranavalona II, previously educated by the London Missionary Society, underwent baptism into the Church of England and subsequently made the Anglican faith the official state religion of Madagascar. The queen had all the sampy (traditional royal idols) burned in a public display. Catholic and Protestant missionaries arrived in numbers to build churches and schools. The reign of Queen Ranavalona II proved the high water mark of British influence in Madagascar. British goods and weapons arrived on the island by way of South Africa.

==== Queen Ranavalona III (1883–1897) ====
Her public coronation as queen took place on 22 November 1883 and she took the name Ranavalona III. As her first order of business she confirmed the nomination of Rainilaiarivony and his entourage in their positions. She also promised to do away with the French threat.

==== End of the monarchy ====
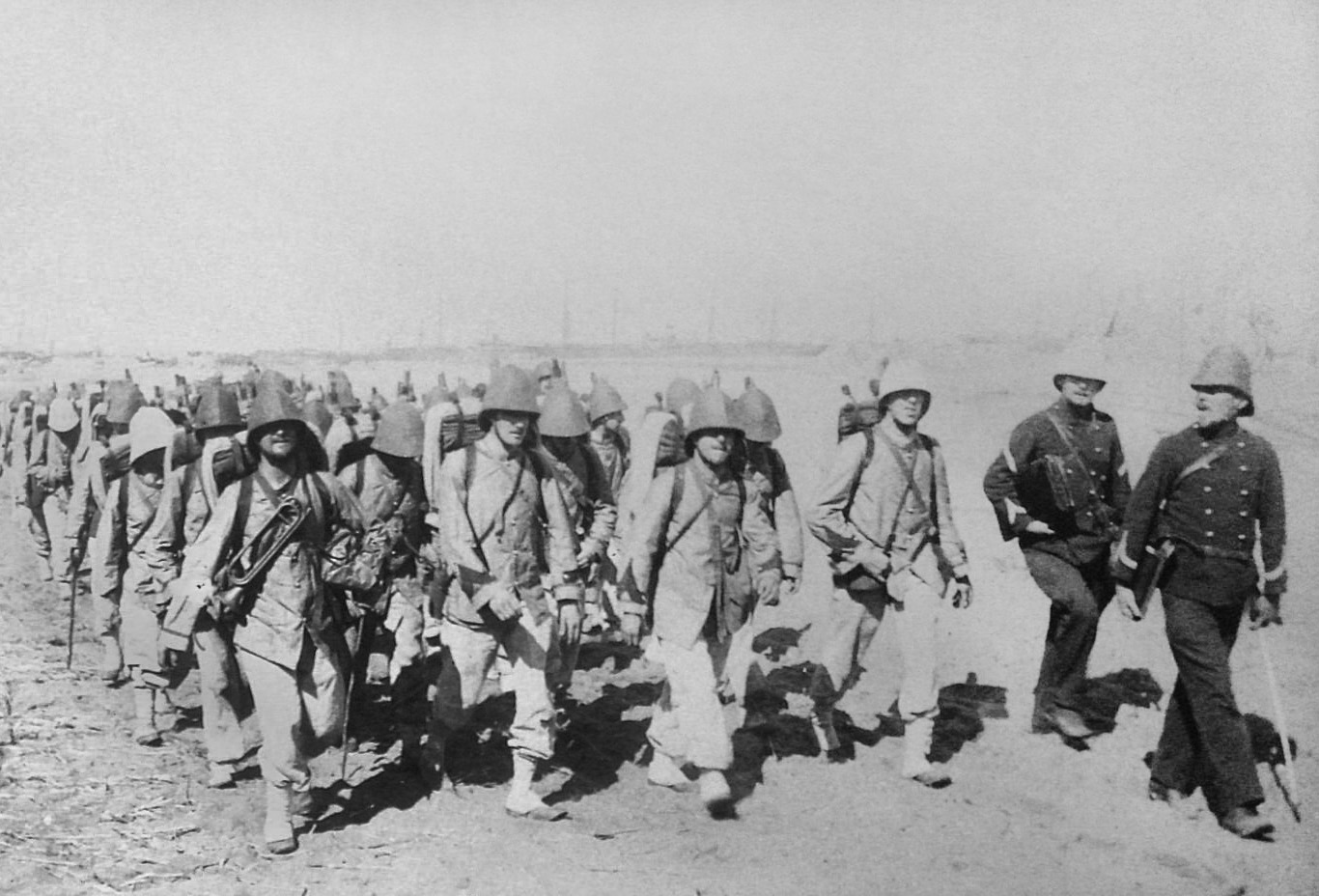
Landing of the 40th Bataillon de Chasseur à Pieds in Majunga, between 5 May and 24 May 1895.

Angry at the cancellation of the Lambert Charter and seeking to restore property seized from French citizens, France invaded Madagascar in 1883 in what became known as the first Franco-Hova War (Hova as a name referring to the Merina aristocrats). At the war's end, Madagascar ceded Antsiranana (Diégo Suarez) on the northern coast to France and paid 560,000 gold francs to the heirs of Joseph-François Lambert. In Europe, meanwhile, European diplomats had worked out an agreement whereby Britain, in order to establish control over the Sultanate of Zanzibar, ceded its rights over the island of Heligoland to Germany and renounced all claims of influence in Madagascar in favor of France. The agreement spelled the end of the Malagasy political independence. Rainilaiarivony had succeeded in playing the various European powers against one another, but now France could act without fear of British support towards the Malagasies.

In 1895, a French flying column landed in Mahajanga (Majunga) and marched by way of the Betsiboka River to the capital, Antananarivo, taking the city's defenders by surprise (they had expected an attack from the much closer east coast). Twenty French soldiers died fighting and 6,000 died of malaria and other diseases before the second Franco-Hova War ended. In 1896 the French Parliament voted to annex Madagascar. The 103-year-old Merina monarchy ended with the royal family sent into exile in Algeria.

=== International recognition and modernization of the Kingdom (1817–1895) ===
The kingdom of Madagascar continued its transformation throughout the 19th century from a locally grown monarchy into a modern state.

Before Radama I the Malagasy language was written in a script known as sorabe. In 1820 under the direction of David Jones, a Welsh missionary of the London Missionary Society, Radama I codified the new Malagasy Latin alphabet of 21 letters which replaced the old sorabe alphabet. By 1830 the Bible was the first book written in this new Malagasy Latin alphabet. It is the oldest complete translation of the bible into a sub-Saharan African language.

The United States and the Kingdom of Madagascar concluded a commercial convention in 1867 after which Queen Rasoherina and Prime Minister Rainilaiarivoy exchanged gifts with president Andrew Johnson. A treaty of peace, friendship, and commerce was then signed in 1881.

During the reign of Ranavalona I, early attempts at industrialization took place from 1835 under the direction of the French Jean Laborde (a survivor of a shipwreck off the east coast), producing soap, porcelain, metal tools and firearms (rifles, cannons, etc.)..

In 1864 Antananarivo opened the first hospital and a modern medical school. Two years later appeared the first newspaper. A scientific journal in English (Antananarivo Annual) was released from 1875. In 1894, on the eve of the establishment of colonial rule, the schools of the kingdom, mainly led by the Protestant missions, were attended by over 200,000 students.

== French colonization ==
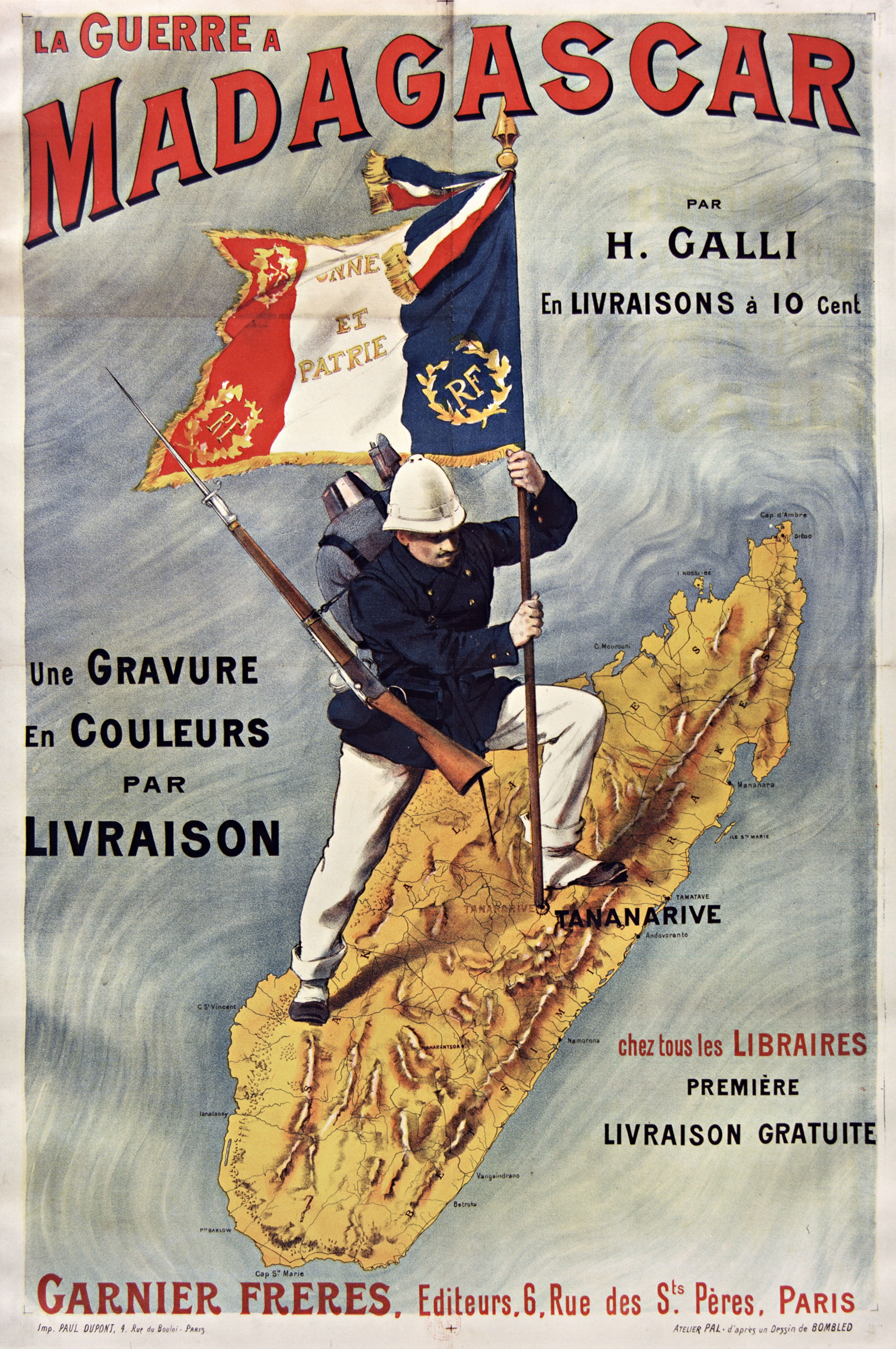
Poster of the French war in Madagascar

In 1750, the ruler of the Kingdom of Betsimisaraka, Bety of Betsimisaraka, ceded the island Nosy Boraha (Île Sainte-Marie) to the Kingdom of France. However, in 1752 the French Colonists were massacred when the local population rebelled. France left the settlement abandoned for roughly half a century until returning in 1818.

In 1840 Tsiomeko, the ruler of Nosy Be island, accepted French protection in 1840. The French took possession of the island in 1841, and in 1849 an unsuccessful attempt was made to expel them.

In the Berlin Treaty, the British accepted the claims of France to exert its influence on Madagascar, and after the first Franco-Hova Wara treaty of alliance between France and Madagascar was signed on 17 December 1885 by Queen Ranavalona III, granting France a protectorate over the Diego-Suarez bay and surrounding territory, as well as the islands of Nosy-Be and Île Sainte-Marie.

Disagreements on the implementation of this treaty served as a pretext for the French invasion of 1895, which first met little resistance. The authority of the prime minister Rainilaiarivony, in power since 1864, had become very unpopular with the public.

The British accepted the imposition of a French protectorate over Madagascar in 1890 in return for recognition of British sovereignty over Zanzibar (subsequently part of Tanzania) and as part of an overall definition of spheres of influence in the area. The intention of the French was initially to maintain the protectorate in order to control the economy and foreign relations of the island. But later, the outbreak of the Menalamba rebellion and the arrival of General Gallieni (responsible for "pacifying" the country) in 1896 led to the colonization of the island and the exile of the queen to Algeria.

In 1904–1905 Madagascar was the scene of a large-scale uprising by various tribes and tribal leaders, among whom Kotavy, a former French corporal who defected to the rebels, filled a preponderant role.

Malagasy troops fought in France, Morocco, and Syria during World War II. Prior to the implementation of the Final Solution, Nazi Germany had considered the Madagascar Plan, which would have relocated European Jews to Madagascar. After France fell to the Germans in 1940, the Vichy government administered Madagascar until 1942, when British and Commonwealth troops occupied the strategic island in the Battle of Madagascar. The United Kingdom handed over control of the island to Free French Forces in 1943.

== Revolt and decolonization (1947–1960) ==
In 1948, with French prestige at a low ebb, the French government, headed by Prime Minister Paul Ramadier of the French Section of the Workers' International (SFIO) party, suppressed the Madagascar revolt, a nationalist uprising.

The French subsequently established reformed institutions in 1956 under the Loi Cadre (Overseas Reform Act), and Madagascar moved peacefully toward independence. The Malagasy Republic, proclaimed on 14 October 1958, became an autonomous state within the French Community. On 26 March 1960 France agreed to Madagascar becoming fully independent. On 26 June 1960 Madagascar became an independent country and Philibert Tsiranana became its first president.

== Independence ==
=== First Republic (1960–1972) ===
Tsiranana's rule represented continuation, with French settlers (or colons) still in positions of power. Unlike many of France's former colonies, the Malagasy Republic strongly resisted movements towards communism.

In 1972, protests against these policies came to a head and Tsiranana had to step down. He handed power to General Gabriel Ramanantsoa of the army and his provisional government. This régime reversed previous policy in favour of closer ties with the Soviet Union.

On 5 February 1975, Colonel Richard Ratsimandrava became the President of Madagascar. After six days as head of the country, he died in an assassination while driving from the presidential palace to his home. Political power passed to Gilles Andriamahazo.

=== Second Republic (1975–1991) ===
On 15 June 1975, Lieutenant-Commander Didier Ratsiraka (who had previously served as foreign minister) came to power in a coup. Elected president for a seven-year term, Ratsiraka moved further towards socialism, nationalising much of the economy and cutting all ties with France. These policies hastened the decline in the Malagasy economy that had begun after independence as French immigrants left the country, leaving a shortage of skills and technology behind. Ratsiraka's original seven-year term as president continued after his party (Avant-garde de la Révolution Malgache or AREMA) became the only legal party in the 1977 elections.

In the 1980s, Madagascar moved back towards France, abandoning many of its communist-inspired policies in favour of a market economy, though Ratsiraka still kept hold of power.

Eventually, opposition, both within and without, forced Ratsiraka to consider his position and in 1992 the country adopted a new and democratic constitution.

=== Third Republic (1991–2002) ===
The first multi-party elections came in 1993, with Albert Zafy defeating Ratsiraka. Despite being a strong proponent of a liberal, free-market economy, Zafy ran on a ticket critical of the International Monetary Fund (IMF) and the World Bank. During his presidency the country struggled to implement IMF and World Bank guidelines that were, on the short term, suicidal politically.

As president Zafy was frustrated by the restraints placed upon the powers of his office by the new constitution. His quest for increased executive power put him on a collision course with the parliament led by then prime minister Francisque Ravony. Zafy eventually won the power he sought after but suffered impeachment at the hands of the disenfranchised parliament in 1996 for violating the constitution by refusing to promulgate specific laws.

The ensuing elections saw a turnout of less than 50% and unexpectedly resulted in the re-election of Didier Ratsiraka. He moved further towards capitalism. The influence of the IMF and the World Bank led to widespread privatisation.

Opposition to Ratsiraka began to grow again. Opposition parties boycotted provincial elections in 2000, and the 2001 presidential election produced more controversy. The opposition candidate Marc Ravalomanana claimed victory after the first round (in December) but the incumbent rejected this position. In early 2002 supporters of the two sides took to the streets and violent clashes took place. Ravalomanana claimed that fraud had occurred in the polls. After an April recount the High Constitutional Court declared Ravalomanana president. Ratsiraka continued to dispute the result but his opponent gained international recognition, and Ratsiraka had to go into exile in France, though forces loyal to him continued activities in Madagascar.

=== Post-Ratsiraka ===
Ravalomanana's Tiako I Madagasikara party achieved overwhelming electoral success in December 2001 and he survived an attempted coup in January 2003. He used his mandate to work closely with the IMF and the World Bank to reform the economy, to end corruption and to realise the country's potential. Ratsiraka went on trial (in absentia) for embezzlement (the authorities charged him with taking $8m of public money with him into exile) and the court sentenced him to ten years' hard labour.

Ravalomanana is credited with improving the country's infrastructure, such as roads, along with making improvements in education and health, but has faced criticism for his lack of progress against poverty; purchasing power is said to have declined during his time in office. On 18 November 2006, his plane was forced to divert from Madagascar's capital during a return trip from Europe following reports of a coup underway in Antananarivo and shooting near the airport; however, this alleged coup attempt was unsuccessful.

Ravalomanana ran for a second term in the presidential election held on December 3, 2006. According to official results, he won the election with 54.79% of the vote in the first round; his best results were in Antananarivo Province, where he received the support of 75.39% of voters. He was sworn in for his second term on January 19, 2007.

Ravalomanana dissolved the National Assembly in July 2007, prior to the end of its term, following a constitutional referendum earlier in the year. Ravalomanana said that a new election needed to be held so that the National Assembly would reflect the changes made in this referendum.

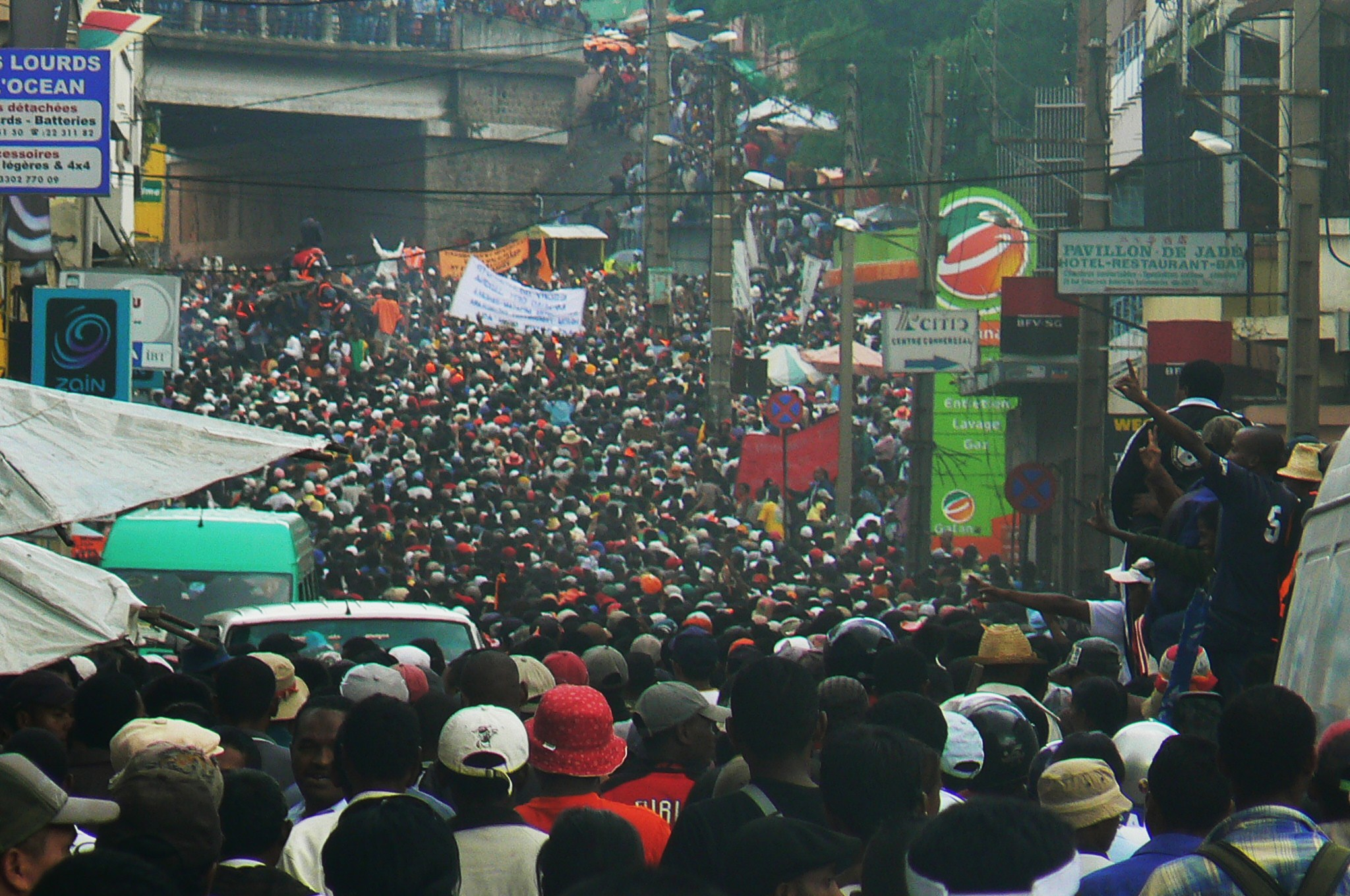
Protesters in Antananarivo, 24 January 2009

He became involved in a political standoff after he closed the TV station belonging to Antananarivo mayor Andry Rajoelina. In January 2009, protests which then turned violent were organized and spearheaded by Andry Rajoelina, the mayor of the capital city of Antananarivo and a prominent opponent of President Ravalomanana.

The situation fundamentally changed on 10 March 2009 when army leaders forced the recently appointed defense secretary to resign (the previous one had decided to resign after the killings by the presidential guard on 7 February 2009). They also announced that they gave the opponents 72 hours to dialogue and find a solution to the crisis before they would take further action. This move came after the leaders of the main military camp had announced a day earlier that they would not execute orders coming from the presidency any more since their duty was to protect the people, and not to oppress them, as groups of the military had done over the last few days.

On 16 March 2009, the army seized the presidential palace in the centre of Antananarivo. Ravalomanana was not in the palace at the time. He handed his resignation to the army, which then decided to hand over power to his fierce political rival, Andry Rajoelina. The second round of the postponed presidential elections was held in December 2013 and the results were announced in January 2014. The winner and the next president was Hery Rajaonarimampianina. He was backed by Rajoelina who led the 2009 coup and still was very influential political figure.

In 2018 the first round of the presidential election was held on 7 November and the second round was held on 10 December. Three former presidents and the most recent president were the main candidates of the elections. Former president Andry Rajoelina won the second round of the elections. He was previously president from 2009 to 2014. Former president Marc Ravalomanana lost the second round and he did not accept the results because of allegations of fraud. Ravalomanana was president from 2002 to 2009. The most recent president Hery Rajaonarimampianina received very modest support in the first round. In January 2019 the High Constitutional Court declared Rajoelina as the winner of the elections and the new president.

In 2019, an epidemic of measles killed 1,200 people.

In 2021, Madagascar's worst drought in 40 years left more than a million people in southern Madagascar food insecure. This forced thousands of people to leave their homes to search for food.

In November 2023, Andry Rajoelina was re-elected to another term with 58.95% of the vote in the first round of the election. Turnout was 46.36%, the lowest in a presidential election in the country's history.

In June 2025, the Franco-Malagasy Joint Commission will meet. This commission is responsible for deciding on the return of the Scattered Islands to Madagascar.

In September 2025, widespread protests erupted against frequent water and power cuts, causing the deaths of over 20 people. In response, Rajoelina sacked Prime Minister Christian Ntsay on 29 September 2025. He said, without providing evidence, that some politicians were plotting to take advantage of the protests and had considered staging a coup while he was addressing the United Nations. On 12 October, Rajoelina's office said that an attempt to topple his government was underway; a statement said the situation was under control. However, on 13 October, an opposition lawmaker reported that Rajoelina had fled the country. Rajoelina addressed the nation later that day, saying that he fled "in fear for his life" but remained defiant, saying that he "would not allow Madagascar to be destroyed" and refusing to step down. After attempting to dissolve the National Assembly, he was impeached and removed from office as the military said that they have seized power. On 17 October 2025, Colonel Michael Randrianirina was sworn in as the new president of Madagascar.

== See also ==
- Ethnic groups of Madagascar
- History of Africa
- History of Southern Africa
- List of Imerina monarchs
- List of presidents of Madagascar
- Politics of Madagascar
- Antananarivo history and timeline
