= Anjajavy Forest =

Coordinates: 15°02′4″S 47°13′28″E

The Anjajavy's Protected Area is located on a peninsula of the town of Antonibe, in the district of Analalava and in the north-west region of Madagascar. It is part of the Sofia region of the independent province of Mahajanga and its position is between 47°13’ at 44°22’ of longitude east and 14°58 at 15°07’ of latitude south..

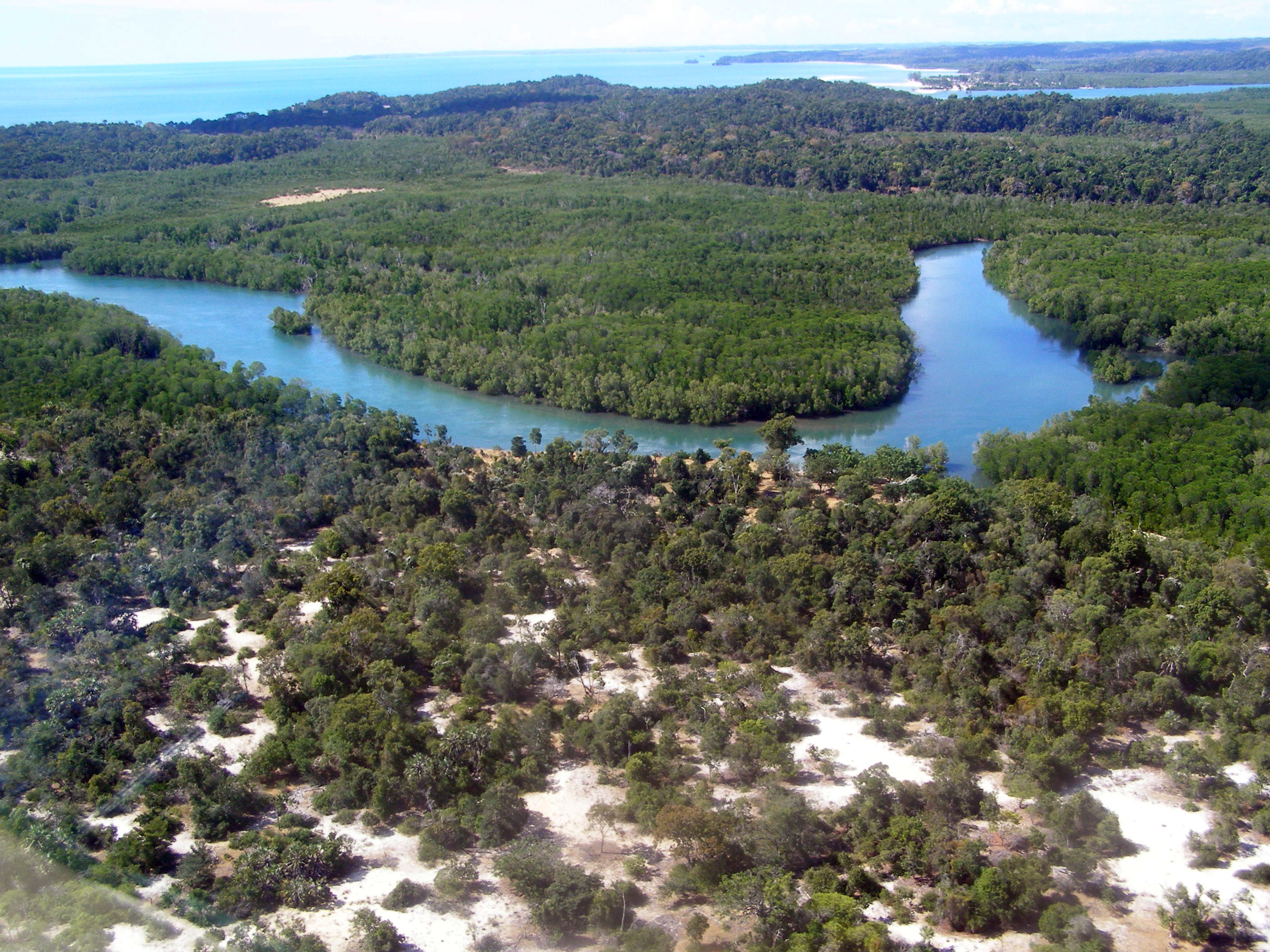
Aerial photo of a portion of the Anjajavy Forest, inset by a swath of mangrove riparian forest.

It can be accessed by an unpaved provincial road from Antonibe and Anjiamangirana I (RN 6).

Anjajavy's Protected Area is an element of the Madagascar dry deciduous forests situated on the Indian Ocean of northwest Madagascar. The Anjajavy Forest surrounds the village of Anjajavy and provides a habitat for many rare and endangered species. It covers roughly fifty square kilometres, and occupies a continuous portion of the peninsula upon which Anjajavy village lies. The peninsula is bounded by Majajamba Bay to the south and Narinda Bay to the north. Anjajavy Forest has much in common with other dry deciduous forests rising out of the tsingy limestone formations of western Madagascar. It is due to the presence of expansive tsingy outcrops as well as the remoteness of this part of Madagascar from the population center of the country at Antananarivo that the forest here has been less disturbed than many other forests in the country. For example, the central highland plateau, readily accessible from the population center, has been decimated by decades of slash-and-burn farming by indigenous peoples, leading to massive desertification and erosion. The incidence of species endemism in the western dry forests is very high, including ten of the fourteen known lemur genera, five of the eight tenrec genera and 16 of the 17 Chiroptera genera of Madagascar represented. There are a variety of mammals, birds, reptiles and arthropods present within the Anjajavy Forest.

Like most of Madagascar's dry deciduous forests, the upper canopy is composed of trees which shed their leaves in the winter months (May through September), including at least two species of baobabs endemic to the western part of the island. Trees here have adapted to the warm arid climate by shedding leaves in the dry season to reduce evapotranspiration, and some species such as the baobab store large amounts of water in their bulbous trunks.

There is a very high rate of species endemicity in all the western dry deciduous forests of Madagascar, for both flora and fauna; this rate is thought to be higher than for the eastern rainforests, although the biodiversity, while extremely high, is slightly less than the eastern counterparts. Geologically the tsingy formations have numerous caverns (used by early tribesmen) and karst formations, which provide underground water storage.

== Flora & Natural Habitats ==
A critically endangered habitat, Anjajavy's Protected Area is a rare and precious dry deciduous forest.

Madagascar is a botanical paradise, with more than 13,000 indigenous species including 900 orchid varieties, 200 palm tree species and 130 species of aloes. The island is so large and has such a diversity of habitats and climates that each corner of Madagascar has its own special community of plants. The forest canopy contains numerous species of deciduous trees, including at least two species of baobab, Adansonia rubrostipa and Adansonia madagascariensis. In addition, trees such as Grewia ciclea (Malagasy name, andilambarika) and Terminalia catappa (Malagasy name: antafana) occur. The latter tree provides a favourite food supply to the Coquerel's lemur, with both fruits and leaves being appealing. Anjajavy finds itself amongst the community of the dry deciduous forests of the North-West; an eco-region recognised by the major international organisations of nature conservation as a global critical priority for conservation. For naturalists and amateurs of plants, there is a lot to see: aloes, euphorbias, bottle-creepers, giant vanilla beans growing on the sharp limestone formations of the Tsingy. The endemic ebony and rosewood trees are also plentiful. Much of the flora in the Protected Area has not been identified. New species are regularly being discovered in particular from December to April throughout the rainy season. Some of the common shrubs found in the Anjajavy forest are Vepris ampody (Malagasy name: ampoly) and Rhizorphora mucronata (Malagasy name: honkovavy). There are also abundant lianas (vines) as well as numerous herbs, including the Madagascar vanilla (Vanilla madagascariensis, whose Malagasy name is vahimatso).

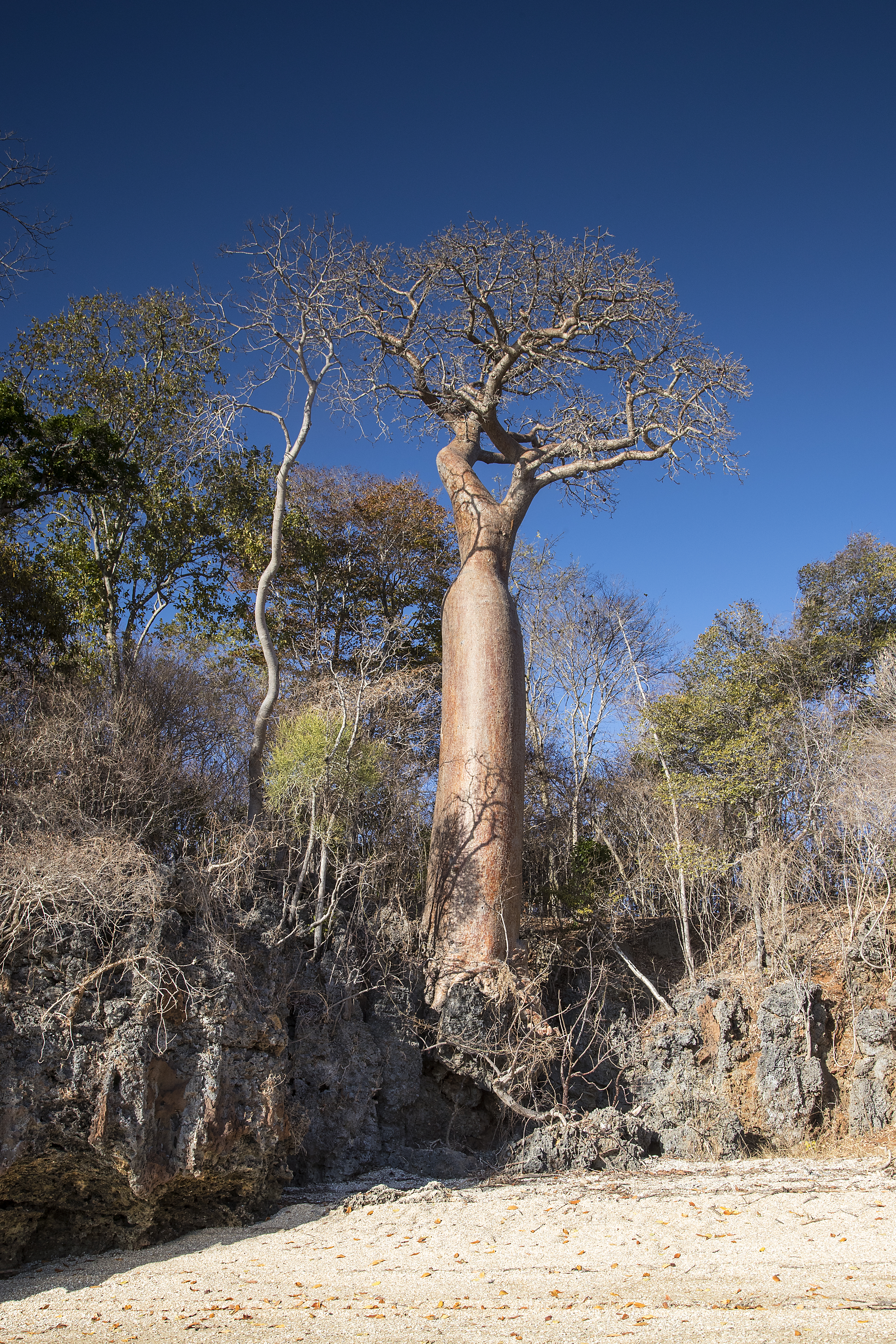
Baobabs of the Anjajavy's Protected Area

The dry forest verges on mangrove swamps in the vicinity of several coastal estuaries at the western verge of the Anjajavy Forest, where small streams discharge into the Indian Ocean.

The Anjajavy's Protected Area and its surroundings include a geological phenomena of rare beauty: the Tsingy. This karstic and highly rugged landscape is the dramatic expression of an evolutionary stage of the earth, taking the shape of a "stone forest", with limestone towers and spurs as high as 30 meters, all within the forest and in the middle of the sea. Nature has adapted itself to these labyrinths for millions of years and has formed unique natural shows of caves, grottos, highland areas, gorges and walls of rugged rocks. Due to their inaccessibility and their resistance to fire, the Tsingy has provided protection for numerous parts of the primary forest.

The baobab tree is an emblem of Madagascar. The large island is home to seven species of baobabs, of which six are endemic. In Anjajavy, there is three species of baobabs: the Grey (Adansonia madagascariensis), the African (Adansonia digitata) and the Fony Baobab (Adansonia rubrostipa). The latter, endemic to the eco-region is red and gold in color with patterns looking as if they were hand-painted. The baobab trees clinging to the Tsingy islands in the turquoise waters of Moramba Bay shape one of Madagascar's most spectacular and magical landscapes. These swollen giants have many outstanding qualities. They are the longest living flowering plants on earth - with some living up to 2,000 years. These trees are true survivors, withstanding terrible droughts and fierce storms, and they can grow on bare rock on sea isles. They can even live and grow wrapped around each other, as if in love. Every baobab has its own shape, its own character, its own story. It is therefore not surprising that these incredible trees are revered by the local people, and that some of them are held as sacred. People make offerings at the base of the baobab, such as zebu horns, coins, rum or honey in the hope of receiving protection from the ancestors.

The Moramba Bay, the malagasy Halong Bay, is a diverse karstic land formation where Anjajavy meets the Mozambique Channel. Along the coast, the jagged cliffs of many marine Tsingy rise close to 30m out of the water.

The Anjajavy Protected Area is protected to the north and west by three wide, separate mangroves and their winding tidal channels. These wetland ecosystems are an example of the vital service nature provides to human beings on a global scale. The mangrove rivers flanking the Anjajavy Forest form excellent natural borders to the Protected Area and convenient transportation routes to visit. The mangroves of Anjajavy comprise a great number of species of trees and shrubs adapted to salty water. One of them, the Jajavy (Salvador angustifolia) has given its name to the village. The root entanglement forming stilts or buttresses, the thick mud and the daily tidal action forms an excellent haven, nursery and larder for terrestrial and aquatic fauna. Hundreds of species of fish, shellfish, insects and birds depend on this habitat for food and shelter. In Anjajavy, the mangrove swamps protect the natural Reserve of dry deciduous forest as well as the Marine Reserve. This biotope simultaneously serves as a curtain of protection against strong and salty winds, a fire-wall, a damp buffer useful to the forest during the dry season and as filter against the turbidity of the coastal waters. The two rivers of mangroves on both sides of the Anjajavy forest constitute excellent natural borders for the Protected Area as well as practical transportation routes which allow for better exploration. In general, the mangroves also provide human beings with vital services; the pneumatophore roots help to stabilise the soft soils and to protect the coast line against erosion and natural catastrophes. On a global scale, these habitats capture carbon in their sediments, where it can remain for centuries. The mangroves are therefore one of the most efficient natural carbon sinks in the world, with rates or carbon sequestration up to 50 times greater than those of tropical forests. The phytoplankton and plankton of the mud constitute the point of origin of food supply chains which provide to the precious fish needed for the second economic source of Anjajavy: the traditional fishing industry.

== Fauna & Exceptional Biodiversity ==
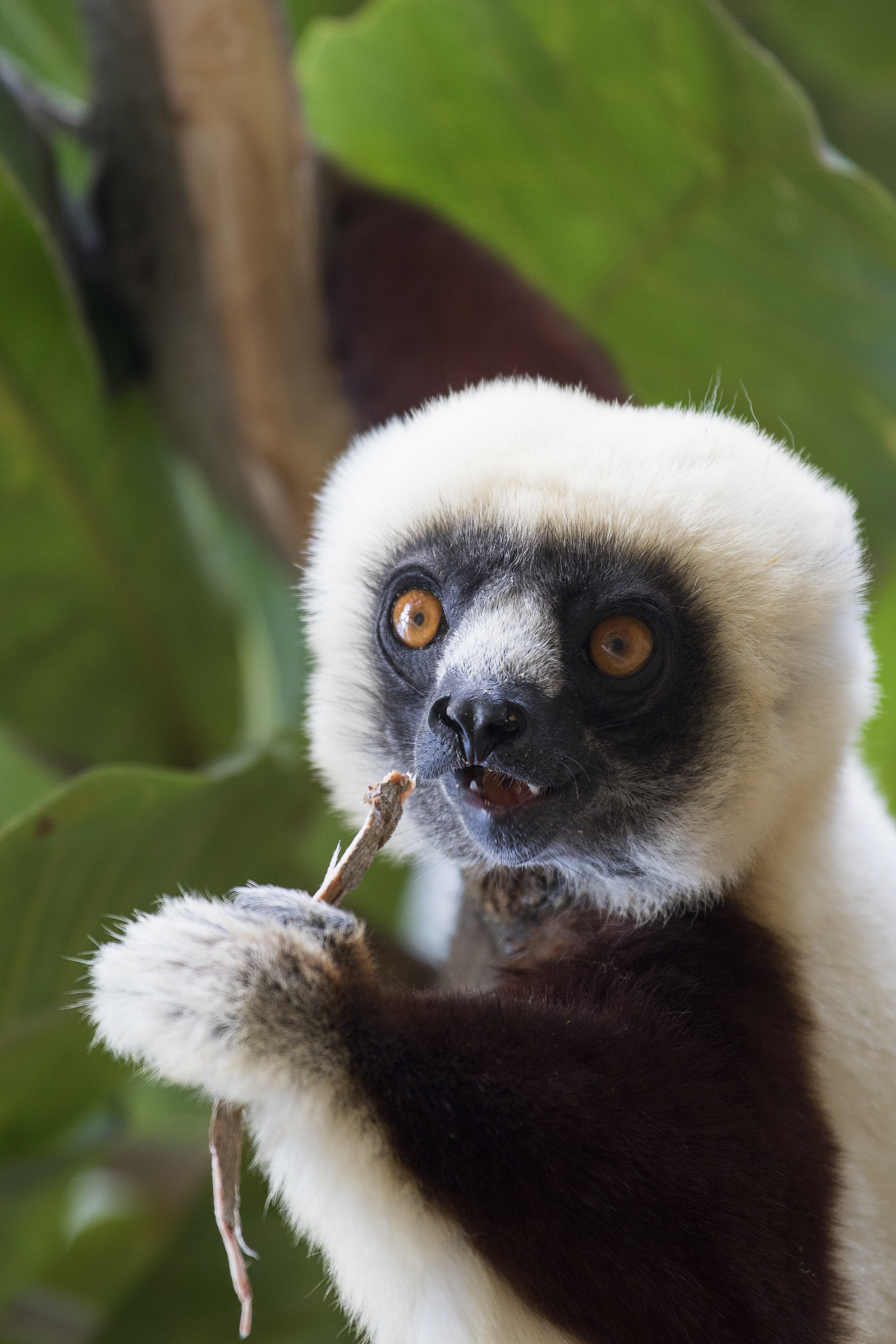
Coquerel's sifaka in the wild, Anjajavy Forest

The inventories and observations of the animal and plant species of Anjajavy are testimony to its great biological wealth, with no fewer than five critically endangered species, 15 in danger of extinction and 13 vulnerable to extinction. The large majority of these species are endemic to Madagascar or to the nearby region.

=== Lemurs ===
The lemurs are easy to observe in their natural environment. Lemurs are a noted species in the Anjajavy Forest, since they are abundant in the trees and even sometimes on the forest floor . The most frequently seen diurnal species are Coquerel's sifaka and the common brown lemur both of which are completely wild but show no fear of humans gardens. Other, nocturnal lemurs of the Anjajavy Forest include three species of mouse lemur (Microcebus spp.), one species of sportive lemur (Lepilemur sp.) and the fat-tailed dwarf lemur (Cheirogaleus medius). Since none of these nocturnal lemur populations have been researched by specialists, it is possible that some may represent new, undescribed species.

Lemurs of the Anjajavy Forest are:

- Milne Edward sportive lemur (Lepilemur edwardsi)
- Coquerel's sifaka (Propithecus coquereli)
- Fat-tailed dwarf lemur (Cheirogaleus medius)
- Golden brown mouse lemur (Microcebus ravelobensis)
- Danfoss mouse lemur (Microcebus danfossi)
- Gray mouse lemur (Microcebus murinus)
- Common brown lemur (Eulemur fulvus)
- Aye-Aye (Daubentonia madagascariensis)

=== Bats ===
The tsingy caves provide special habitat for the bats of this region, offering cool shelter. Probably the most common member of the chiroptera family locally is the Commerson's leaf-nosed bat (Hipposideros commersoni). The cave explorers will also sight Tiavato bats (Paremballonura tiavato) in flight and some hanging from the ceiling on stalactite formations of the limestone cave interiors. A cruise on the mangrove before sunset often shows skies with many Madagascar flying foxes (Pteropus rufus).

=== Fossa ===
Also seen in the Anjajavy Forest area is the endangered Fossa (Cryptoprocta ferox), the largest mammalian carnivore is endemic to the island. Even though it looks similar to a puma, it is actually more closely related to the mongoose and civet. Very comfortable in trees, its long tail helps the animal to balance itself on the branches and its very flexible legs allow it to go down tree trunks head down. The main predator of the lemurs, this mammal is essential to the health of the lemur population as it kills the sick or weakest. Its territory is between 1,300 and 2,600 hectares in size. The Fossa is vulnerable to extinction. As a chicken and cattle hunter, it is seldom welcome around homes.

=== Birds ===
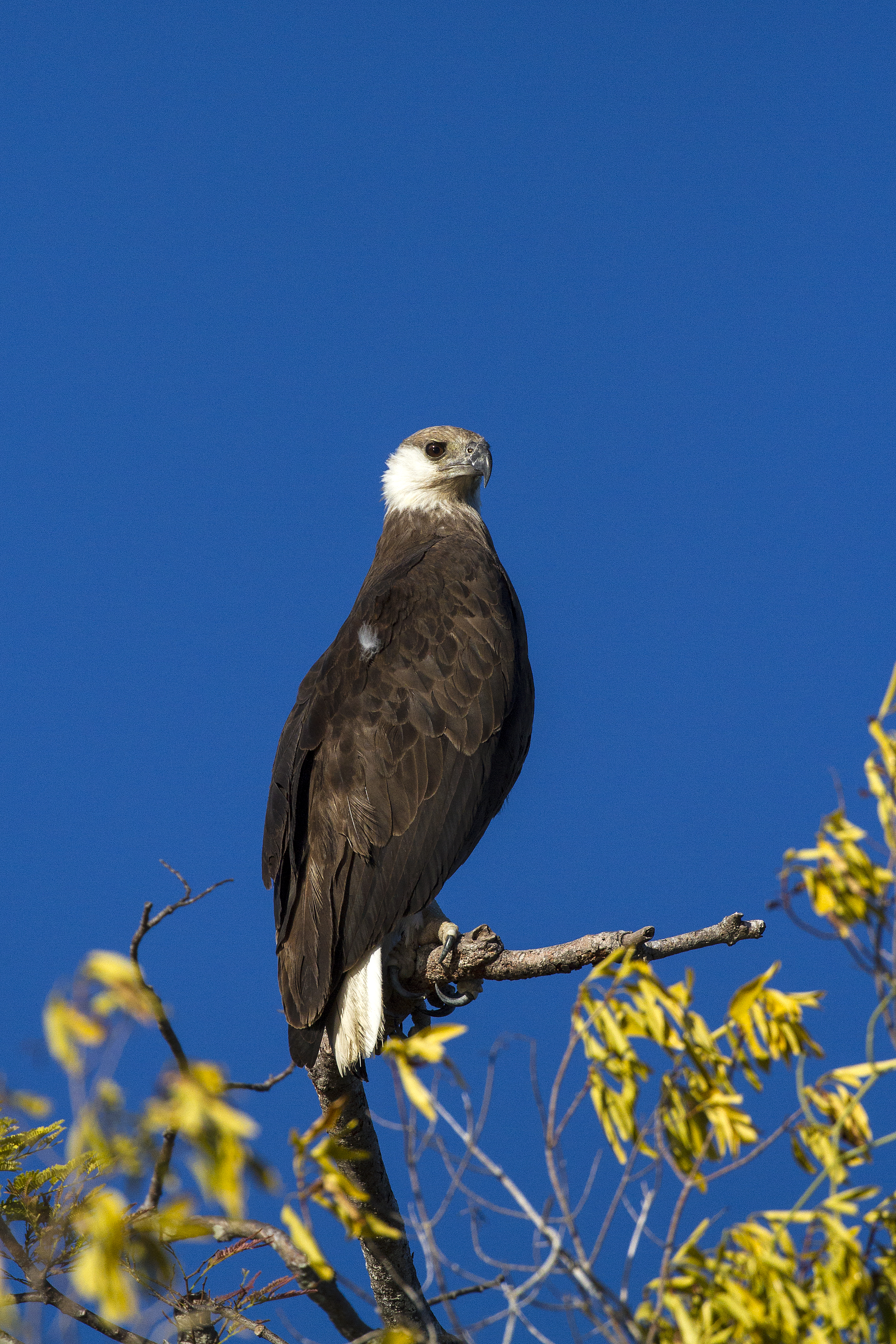
The Malagasy Fish Eagle (Halliaeetus vociferoides) seen in Anjajavy's Protected Area.

There is abundandant birdlife present in the Anjajavy Forest, a paradise for birds and bird watchers. Inventories have documented the presence in the Protected Area of more than 134 different bird species. One of the most emblematic is the Madagascar fish eagle, which has four breeding pairs in the Anjajavy Forest according to Garbutt and Hogan. This very large bird of prey is endemic to western Madagascar, and the species is critically endangered.

The Malagasy Fish Eagle (Haliaeetus vociferoides) called «Ankoay» in Malagasy, is a large bird of prey endemic to the coastal strip North-West of Madagascar. Various estimations place the number of remaining breeding pairs to be between 40 and 150. This bird may therefore be one of the rarest on Earth. We must act fast in order to protect the three to six pairs between Anjajavy's Protected Area and Moramba Bay.

According to Anjajavy le Lodge continuous nature inventory bird species frequenting the Anjajavy Forest are:

- Madagascar fish eagle (Haliaeetus vociferoides)
- Madagascar buzzard (Buteo brachypterus)
- Yellowbilled kite (Milvus migrans )
- Madagascar harrier hawk (Polyboroides radiatus)
- Frances's sparrowhawk (Accipiter francesiae)
- Henst's goshawk (Accipiter henstii)
- Madagascar cuckoo hawk (Aviceda madagascarienis)
- Madagascar sparrowhawk (Accipiter madagascariensis)
- Madagascar lark (Mirafra hova)
- Madagascar kingfisher (Alcedo vintsioides)
- Madagascar pygmy kingfisher (Ispidina madagascariens)
- Redbilled teal (Anas erythorhyncha)
- Blue-billed teal (Anas hottentota)
- Fulvous whistling duck (Dendrocygna bicolor)
- White-faced whistling duck (Dendrocygna viduata)
- Knobbilled duck (Sarkidiornis melanotos)
- Pygmy goose (Nettapus auritus)
- Whitebacked duck (Thalassornis leuconotus)
- African darter (Anhinga rufa)
- African palm swift (Cypsiurus parvus)
- Madagascar black swift (Apus balstoni)
- Alpine swift (Apus melba)
- Madagascar spinetailed swift (Zoonevena grandidieri)
- Cattle egret (Bubulcus ibis)
- Dimorphic egret (Egretta dimorpha)
- Great white egret (Casmerodius albus)
- Goliath héron (Ardea goliath)
- Purple heron (Ardea purpurea)
- Madagascar squacco heron (Ardeola idae)
- Common squacco heron (Ardeola ralloides)
- Little bittern (Ixobrychus minutus)
- Blackcrowned night heron (Nycticorax nycticorax)
- Greenbecked heron (Butorides striatus)
- Black egret (Egretta ardesiaca)
- Grey heron (Ardea cinerea)
- Humblot's heron (Ardea humbloti)
- Madagascar cuckoo shrike, ashy cuckoo shrike (Coracina cinerea)
- Madagascar nightjar (Caprimulgus madagascariensis)
- Common ringed plover (Charadrius hiaticula)
- Grey plover (Pluvialis squatarola)
- Kittlitz's plover (Charadrius pecuarius)
- White-fronted plover (Charadrius marginatus)
- Three-banded plover (Charadrius tricollaris)
- Greater sandplover (Charadrius leschenaultii)
- African openbill stork (Anastomus lamelligerus)
- Malagasy turtle dove (Nesoenas picturatus)
- Madagascar Namaqua dove (Oena capensis aliena)
- Madagascar green pigeon (Treron Australis)
- Broadbilled roller (Eurystomus glaucurus)
- Pied crow (Corvus albus)
- Madagascar lesser cuckoo (Cuculus rochii)
- Madagascar coucal (Centropus toulou)
- Crested coua (Coua cristata)
- Redcapped coua (Coua ruficeps)
- Coquerel's coua (Coua coquereli)
- Crested drongo (Dicrurus forficatus)
- Blackwinged stilt (Himantopus himantopus)
- Crab plover (Dromas ardeola)
- Madagascar kestrel (Falco newtoni)
- Peregrine falcon (Falco Peregrinus)
- Banded kestrel (Falco zonoventris)
- Eleonora's falcon (Falco eleonorae)
- Sooty falcon (Falcon concolor)
- Greater frigatebird (Fregata minor)
- Lesser frigatebird (Fregata ariel)
- Madagascar pratincole (Glareola ocularis)
- Mascarene martin (Phedina borbonica)
- Blackbillied storm petrel (Fregetta tropica)
- Whitebellied storm petrel (Fregetta grallaria)
- Madagascar jacana (Actphilornis albinucha)
- Roseate stern (Sterna dougallii)
- Madagascar cuckooroller (Leptosomus discolor)
- Madagascar bee eater (Merops ciperciliosus)
- Madagascar paradise flycatcher (Terpsiphone mutata)
- Madagascar wagtail (Motacilla flaviventris)
- Madagascar magpie robin (Copsychus albospecularis)
- Souimanga sunbird (Nectarnia souimanga)
- Madagascar green sunbird (Nectarinia notata)
- Helmeted guineafowl (Numida meleagris mitrata)
- Reed cormorant (Phalacrocorax Africanus)
- Common quail (Coturnix coturnix)
- Lesser flamingo (Phoenicopterus minor)
- Madagascar fody (Foudia madagascariensis)
- Sakalava weaver (Ploceus sakalava)
- Madagascar little grebe (Tachybaptus pelzelnii)
- Dabchick little grebe (Tachybaptus ruficollis)
- Tropical shearwater (Puffinus bailloni)
- Wedgetailed shearwater (Puffinus pacificus)
- Greyheaded lovebird (Agapornis cana)
- Greater vasa parrot (Coracopsis vasa)
- Lesser vasa parrot (Coracopsis Nigra)
- Madagascar sandgrouse (Pterocles personatus)
- Madagascar bulbul (hypsipetes madagascariensis)
- Long-billed tetraka (Phylastephus madagascariensis)
- Whitethroated rail (Dryolimnas cuvieri)
- Baillon crake (Porzana pusilla)
- Lesser Allen's gallinule (Porphyrula alleni)
- Purple gaillinule (Porphyrio porphyrio)
- Common moorhen (Gallinula chloropus)
- Greater painted snipe (Rostratula benghalensis)
- Whimbrel (Numenius phaeopus)
- Eurasian curlew (Numenius arquata)
- Common sandpiper (Actitis hypoleucos)
- Terek sandpiper (Tringa cinerea)
- Sanderling (Calidris alba)
- Curlew sandpiper (Calidris ferruginea)
- Hamerkop (Scopus umbretta)
- Greater crested tern (Sterna bergii)
- Lesser crested tern (Sterne bengalensis)
- Suanders stern (Sterne suandersi)
- Madagascar scops owl (Otus rutilus)
- Barn owl (Tyto alba)
- Common mynah (Acridotheres tristis)
- Madagascar starling (Aruaubius auratus)
- Redfooted booby (Sula sula)
- Madagascar cisticola (Cisticola cherina)
- Common newtonia (Newtonia brunnecauda)
- Madagascar brush warbler (Nesillas typica)
- Madagascar crested Iibis (Lophotibis cristata)
- Madagascar white ibis (Threskiornis bernieri)
- Glossy ibis (Plegadis falcinellus)
- African spoonbill (Platalea alba)
- Common jery (Neomixis tenella)
- Malagasy stonechat (Saxicola sibilla)
- Madagascar buttonquail (Turnix nigricollis)
- Madagascar mannikin (Lonchura nana)
- Madagascar hoopoe (Upupa marginata)
- Sicklebilled vanga (Falculea palliata)
- Whiteheaded vanga (Leptopterus viridis)
- Chabert's vanga (Leptopterus chabert)
- Madagascar blue vanga (Cyanolanius madagascaru)
- Hookbilled vanga (Vanga curvirostris)
- Madagascar whiteeye (Zosterops maderaspatanus)

=== Reptiles & Amphibians ===
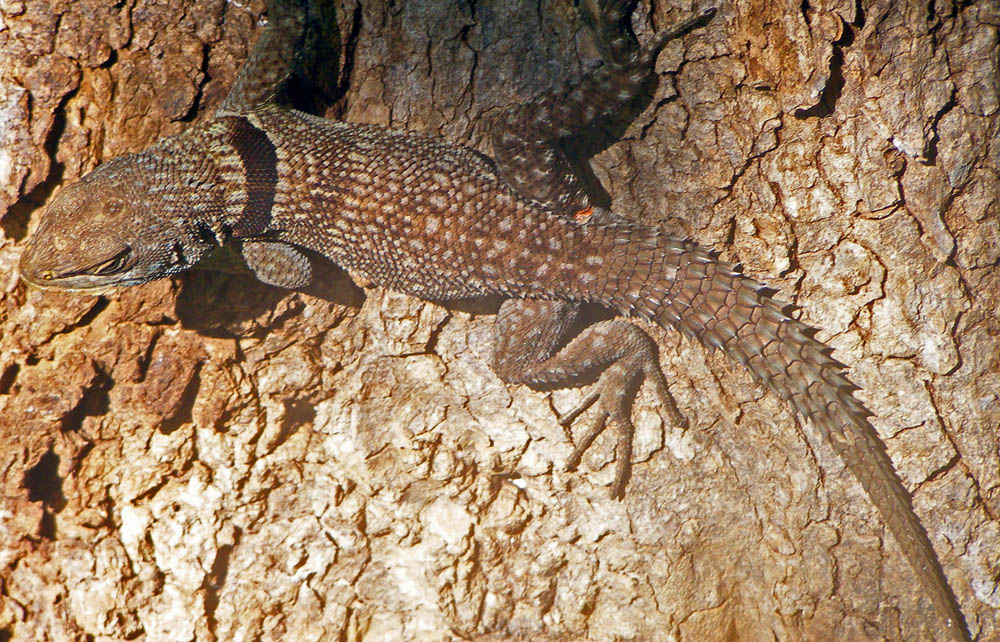
Collared iguanid lizard in the wild in Anjajavy Forest

Anjajavy is home to an amazing diversity of lizards and other reptiles: the tropical climate and regular sunshine provide the perfect environment for about 40 species. Each tree seems to accommodate a gold-flecked gecko or a chameleon. After the dry season from May to October it is easy to see an assortment of chameleons, lizards and snakes in the Anjajavy Forest.

Among the snakes (that are not dangerous) are :

- Madagascar ground boa (Acrantophis madagascariensis) that can swallow a lemur in half an hour
- Madagascar hog-nosed snake (Leioheterodon madagascariensis)=
- Madagascar tree boa (Sanzinia madagascariensis)
- Cat eye snake (Madagascarophis colubrinus)
- Red eye snake (Stenophis variabilis)
- White hognose snake (Leioheterodon modestus)
- Leaf nose snake (Langaha madagascariensis)
- Zebra snake (Langaha alluaudi)
- Sword tailed snake (Ithycyphus perineti)
- (Liophidium torquatum)
- Whip snake (Dromicodryas bernieri)
- (Dromicodryas quadrilineatus)
- Pencil snake (Mimophis mahfalensis)
- (Heteroliodon accipitalis)
- (Heteroliodon fohy)

Chameleon species present include:

- Giant chameleon (Furcifer oustaleti)
- Panther chameleon (Furcifer pardalis)
- Long nose chameleon (Furcifer angeli)
- Pygmy caméleon (Brookesia ambreensis)
- Plated leaf chameleon (Brookesia stumpffi)

==== Madagascan Big-Headed Turtle ====
This species of freshwater turtle (Erymnochelys madagascariensis) enjoys the lakes and streams of the Malagasy North-West coast. Its habitat is in great danger of destruction in favor of rice cultivation. The species is also threatened by collecting for the markets of traditional Asian pharmacopeia. It is the focus of numerous conservation programmes. Anjajavy le Lodge is pursuing a project of conservation of this turtle through monitoring of reproduction sites and through community awareness-raising campaigns.

== See also ==
- Madagascar dry deciduous forests
- Karst topography
