= Our Madagascar =

Political party in Madagascar

Our Madagascar (Malagasy: Madagasikarantsika) is a political party in Madagascar. The party's candidate Elia Ravelomanantsoa won 2.56% in the December 2006 presidential election. Since the 23 September 2007 Malagasy parliamentary election it is no longer represented in parliament
