= 2006 Malagasy coup attempt =

2006 attempt to overthrow President Marc Ravalomanana

2006 Malagasy coup d'état attempt
Date	November 18, 2006
Location	Antananarivo, Madagascar
Result	Failure of the coup

Belligerents
Government of Madagascar	(Madagascar) General Fidy and allies

Commanders and leaders
President Marc Ravalomanana	General Andrianafidisoa

An alleged coup d'état attempt occurred in Madagascar on November 18, 2006, during the lead-up to the December 3 presidential election, when retired army General Andrianafidisoa, also known as Fidy (and a previous Director General of OMNIS), declared military rule.

According to judicial authorities, Andrianafidisoa was not allowed to run for president after failing to pay a 25 million ariary (US$11,400) deposit. Fidy had previously supported the incumbent President Marc Ravalomanana in his successful claim to the presidency in the wake of the disputed 2001 presidential election.

== Coup events ==
General Fidy declared military rule and set up a base near the Ivato Airport in the capital, Antananarivo. There were police reports of shooting early in the morning of November 18, and that one soldier was killed and another wounded. President Ravalomanana was returning from France during the incident and his plane was diverted from Antananarivo to Mahajanga instead.

== Aftermath ==
On November 19, 2006 the government said it was searching for General Fidy, and dozens of soldiers were stationed outside his house. Secretary of State for Public Security, Lucien Victor Razakanirina, told Reuters, "We issued a wanted poster for General Fidy for an attack on state security. We went to arrest General Fidy, but he was no longer at his house. He is very mobile." Fidy told Reuters via telephone, "I am alive and I am not in hiding. Soldiers and politicians have got the message." He would not disclose his location.

In a radio interview on November 20, Fidy, who had still not been captured, said that the idea that there had been a coup attempt was a misinterpretation, but acknowledged that he had called for Ravalomanana's resignation because he considered the government to be unconstitutional. On November 22, Fidy received the backing of most of the 14 presidential candidates, who said he was defending the constitution and the interests of the nation. After the elections were held on December 3, the government unsuccessfully attempted to arrest one of these candidates, Pety Rakotoniaina, although it denied that it sought to arrest him because of his support for Fidy.

A $50,000 reward was offered for Fidy's arrest. Razakanirina said that Fidy was taken by surprise and captured on December 12 at a hotel, and that he did not resist. During his trial, he and his lawyers argued that he had not attempted a coup, but had instead attempted to alert Ravalomanana to the situation of the armed forces. He was sentenced to four years in prison on February 2, 2007. After the failed coup, over 20 different officials and individuals were arrested, "including two French nationals, a retired general, a former prime minister, a former candidate for the Madagascan presidential election in 2006, and a senior official of the Gendarmerie, or national police force.
