= Marovatolena =

Town and commune in Sofia, Madagascar

- Location in Madagascar
- Coordinates: 15°11′S 47°39′E
- Country: Madagascar
- Region: Sofia
- District: Analalava
- Elevation: 211 m (692 ft)

Population (2001)
  - Total: 9,000
- Time zone: UTC3 (EAT)

Marovatolena is a town and commune (Malagasy: kaominina) in Madagascar. It belongs to the district of Analalava, which is a part of Sofia Region. The population of the commune was estimated to be approximately 9,000 in 2001 commune census.

Primary and junior level secondary education are available in town. The majority 90% of the population of the commune are farmers, while an additional 5% receives their livelihood from raising livestock. The most important crop is rice, while other important products are cassava and seeds of catechu. Services provide employment for 5% of the population.

== Road ==
There is an unpaved provincial road from the RN 6 and Anjiamangirana I.
