= Pety Rakotoniaina =

Malagasy politician

Pety Rakotoniaina (born 14 October 1962) is a Malagasy politician. He is the President of the Union (Tambatra) association and was the Mayor of Fianarantsoa.

== Political career ==
=== Early life and first political office ===
Born in Ikalamavony, Rakotoniaina studied at the University of Fianarantsoa Madagascar. In 1993, he was elected to the National Assembly as a Deputy of the Militants for the Progress of Madagascar (MFM) for the Ikalamavony district, winning 57% of the vote. He was re-elected with 83% of the vote in 1998.

=== Governor of Fianarantsoa ===
In March 2002, during the conflicts following the December 2001 presidential election, Rakotoniaina was named President of the Special Delegation (Governor) of Fianarantsoa Province by Marc Ravalomanana. In April, forces supporting Didier Ratsiraka left the region's capital, and Rakotoniaina was able to take office. In May 2002, he founded the Union (Tambatra) political association.

=== Dismissal from office ===
Ravalomanana dismissed Rakotoniaina from his position on January 27, 2003, and replaced him with Ravelomanga Randrianarivo. Rakotoniaina attempted to hold on to power for several days, without success; objecting to his dismissal, he said: "No one, at any level of this regime, can claim to have done more for President Ravalomanana than I have." His wife was reportedly ambushed, along with other passengers in a vehicle, by gunmen in Isorana on May 31, 2003.

=== Mayor of Fianarantsoa ===
Rakotoniaina, having become an opponent of Ravalomanana and the ruling Tiako I Madagasikara (TIM) party and running as the Tambatra candidate, was elected as the Mayor of Fianarantsoa in the municipal election held on November 23, 2003; he defeated the TIM candidate, Raymond Ratovondrahona. There were rumors that the results might be cancelled and the election held over again, and Rakotoniaina said there was no valid reason for this to occur. His victory was, however, confirmed by the Fianarantsoa electoral court on December 11, 2003. An alleged assassination attempt against him also occurred on the same day.

== 2006 attempted coup and arrest ==
General Andrianafidisoa (Fidy), to whom Rakotoniaina is considered close, allegedly attempted a coup in November 2006, two weeks before the December 2006 presidential election. Rakotoniaina, who was standing as a presidential candidate, was among the majority of candidates who expressed their support for Fidy, saying that he was defending the constitution. In the election, Rakotoniaina was highly critical of Ravalomanana. He placed eighth in the December 3 election, with 1.68% of the votes cast. His only significant support was in Fianarantsoa Province, where he won 7.42% of the vote.

A few days after the election, the authorities attempted to arrest Rakotoniaina, surrounding his home at night, but he was not present and was thought to be in hiding. He had allegedly held a gathering on December 2, after the legal period for campaigning had ended, misused public property, and made death threats against officials and police officers. A warrant was issued for Rakotoniaina's arrest, and a reward of 100 million ariary was offered for information leading to his capture. On June 19, 2007, his wife, Ialy Rakotoniaina, was arrested for alleged complicity in an arson attack at the University of Fianarantsoa that occurred on June 13. Some believed that she was being used as a hostage to force her husband out of hiding.

On July 19, 2007, Rakotoniaina was captured in Fianarantsoa and held on charges of the theft of state cars. On October 8, 2007, he received a five-year prison sentence for the 2002 and 2003 theft of three of the province's vehicles. A former aide to Rakotoniaina implicated him, claiming that he had stolen vehicles for Rakotoniaina. Additional charges against Rakotoniaina related to forgery were dropped. Rakotoniaina's lawyer, Adolphe Lalao, described the trial as politically motivated and said that there had not been enough evidence for a conviction.

== Pardon ==
Ravalomanana was forced out of office by a combination of popular protests and military intervention in March 2009. Opposition leader Andry Rajoelina then took over as President of the High Authority of the Transition and promptly pardoned Rakotoniaina, along with many other political prisoners (including Andrianafidisoa), on 26 March 2009. Rajoelina also appointed Rakotoniaina's wife, Ialy Rakotoniaina, as a member of the High Authority of the Transition, and on 1 April 2009 he announced that he was restoring Rakotoniaina to his former position as Mayor of Fianarantsoa. Upon Rakotoniaina's arrival in Fianarantsoa, he received a hero's welcome.
