= Avison =

Avison is a name. Notable people with that name include:

As a surname

- Al Avison (1920–84), American comic book artist
- Charles Avison (1709–70), English composer during the Baroque and Classical periods
- David Avison (1937–2004), American photographer and physicist
- John Avison (1915–83), Canadian conductor and pianist
- Margaret Avison (1918–2007), Canadian prizewinning poet
- Oliver R. Avison (1860–1959), Canadian medical missionary

As a personal name

- André Avison Tsitohery (active 2009), Malagasy politician
- Avison Scott (1848–1925), English first class cricketer

== See also ==
- Avison Ensemble, one of England's foremost exponents of classical music on period instruments
