= Daniel Rajakoba =

Malagasy politician

Personal details
- Born: Antonibe, Sofia Region
- Party: Fihavanantsika
- Education: Antananarivo University

Daniel Rajakoba (21 October 1940 – 30 June 2024) was a Malagasy politician.

== Education ==
Born in Antonibe, Sofia Region, Rajakoba studied teaching at Antananarivo University. He became a professor before being appointed Minister of the Civil Service, Labour, and Social Laws by President Gabriel Ramanantsoa in 1972, a post he held until Didier Ratsiraka seized power in 1975. He preached on the radio every week during this period.

In 1987, Rajakoba went to study theology and linguistics in Aix-en-Provence and Montpellier. In 1999, he was made a Pastor of the Church of Jesus Christ in Madagascar, and he began preaching for the Malagasy Protestant Church of France.

== Political career ==
On August 3, 2001, the Isika Miara-Mandroso (Imima) association announced that it was presenting Rajakoba as a candidate in the December 2001 presidential election. Rajakoba returned to Madagascar in that year and received 2.0% of the votes in the election. He founded the Fihavanantsika party in 2002, and on June 14, 2006 he announced that he would run again in the December 2006 presidential election as Fihavanantsika's candidate. In the election, he placed tenth with 0.64% of the vote.

In 2011, Daniel Rajakoba openly criticized Andry Rajoelina's regime, calling it a new form of organized colonialism.

== Private life ==
He married Monique Rakoto in 1967, and together they have eight children.
