= Jean Lahiniriko =

Malagasy politician

Jean Lahiniriko (born April 1, 1956) is a Malagasy politician. He served in the government of Madagascar as Minister of Public Works from 2002 to 2003 and was president of the National Assembly of Madagascar from 2003 to 2006. Subsequently he was the second place candidate in the 2006 presidential election. He is now the president of the Socialist and Democratic Party for the Unity of Madagascar (PSDUM) and a member of the High Transitional Authority under President Andry Rajoelina.

Lahiniriko was born in Tongobory, Atsimo-Andrefana in the south of Madagascar and studied at the Lycée de génie civil d'Ampefoloha à Antananarivo. In the late 1970s, he moved to undertake further studies in civil engineering in Cuba. After working on various civil engineering projects, in 1985, he became the director of Zanatany, then from 1989 until 2003 he held various prominent civil service posts.

Under President Marc Ravalomanana, Lahiniriko was appointed as the Minister of Public Works in Prime Minister Jacques Sylla's first government, named on March 1, 2002, remaining in that position until January 2003. He was elected to the National Assembly in the December 2002 parliamentary election from the Betioky Sud district in Toliara Province under the banner of the Tiako I Madagasikara (TIM) party, receiving 56% of the vote in his district. On January 21, 2003, he was elected as president of the National Assembly, receiving 113 out of 146 votes.

In April 2006, Lahiniriko visited Iran and while there commented positively on Iran's nuclear programme. At home, his comments led to accusations of treason from members of parliament; Lahiniriko said the comments had only represented his personal views and were not intended as a statement of official policy. On May 8, the National Assembly voted Lahiniriko out of his position as its president, with 119 out of 160 legislators in favor of his removal. He was also expelled from TIM a week before he was voted out of his position. Two days after being removed from office, he announced that he would run for president in the December 2006 presidential election. According to official results, he placed second, with 11.65% of the vote, behind Ravalomanana, who received a majority in the first round. Lahiniriko received his strongest support in his home province of Toliara, where he won 45.95% of the vote, ten points more than Ravalomanana.

Lahiniriko's campaign director called the results false and said that Ravalomanana had only won about 49%. Lahiniriko claimed that there were problems with the electoral list and said that he did not accept the official results. He and third place candidate Roland Ratsiraka said that they were challenging the results in court and that they wanted the election to be held over again.

Lahiniriko opposed the constitutional changes proposed in the 2007 constitutional referendum and participated in a national committee that campaigned for a "no" vote as a coordinator of action.

Lahiniriko launched a new party, the Socialist and Democratic Party for the Unity of Madagascar (PSDUM), in early February 2007, with himself as its president. He stood for re-election to his National Assembly seat from Betioky Sud district as a PSDUM candidate in the September 2007 parliamentary election; running against him was the TIM candidate, André Avison Tsitohery, who was elected as Lahiniriko's substitute in the 2002 election. Tsitohery defeated Lahiniriko by a large margin according to provisional results, winning 52.06% of the vote against Lahiniriko's 22.39%, a difference of 11,600 votes; however, Lahiniriko's supporters disputed this, claiming he was actually ahead of Tsitohery by 2,873 votes.

Ravalomanana was forced to resign amidst a political crisis in March 2009, and opposition leader Andry Rajoelina took power. Rajoelina set up the High Authority of the Transition (HAT) as the ruling body, and Lahiniriko was appointed as one of the HAT's 44 members on March 31, 2009.

Lahiniriko is a member of the Lutheran Church of Madagascar.
