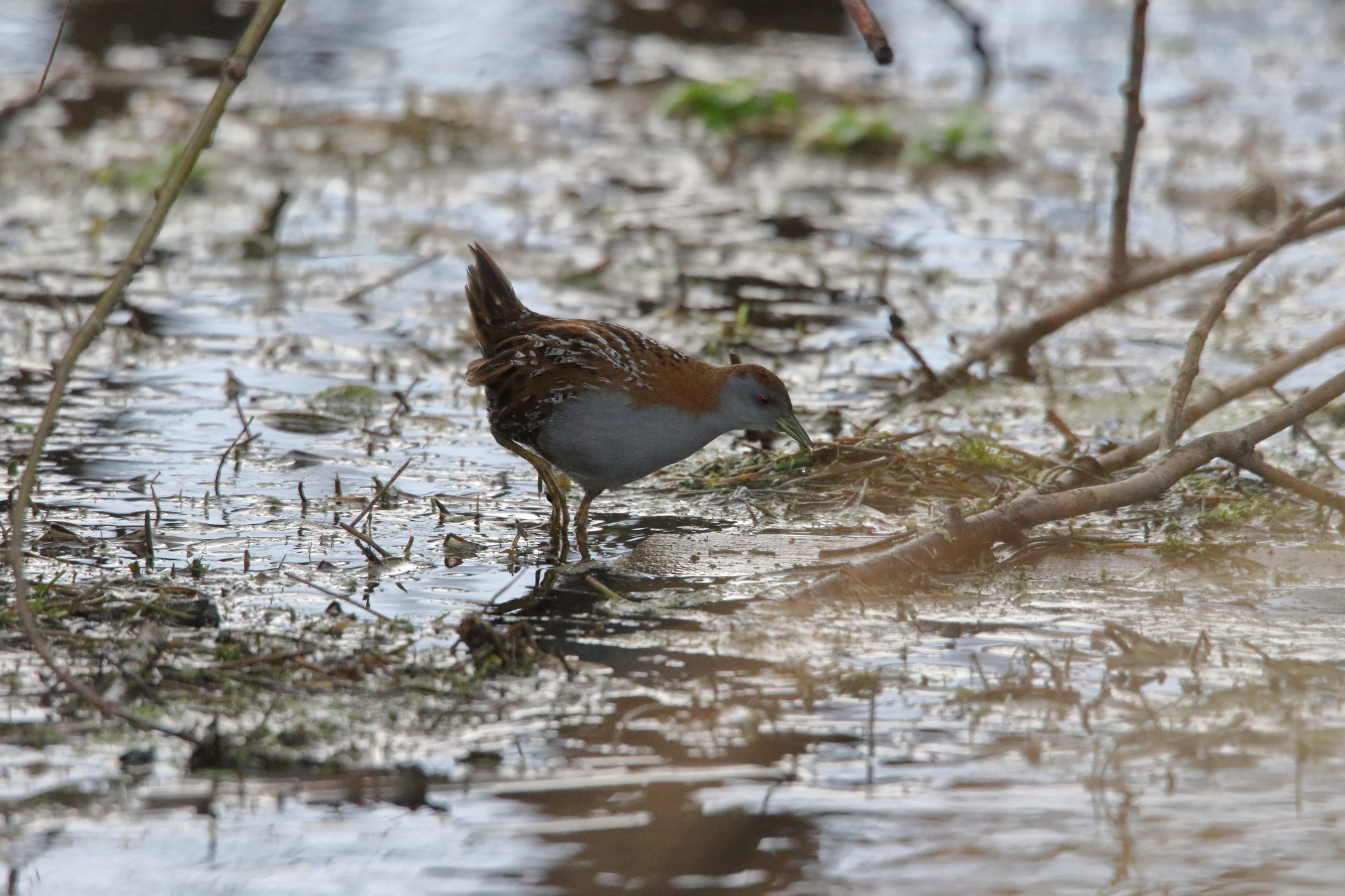
- Zapornia pusilla affinis seen near Christchurch, New Zealand

Conservation status
- Declining (NZ TCS)

Scientific classification
- Kingdom: Animalia
- Phylum: Chordata
- Class: Aves
- Order: Gruiformes
- Family: Rallidae
- Genus: Zapornia
- Species: Z. pusilla
- Subspecies: Z. p. affinis

Trinomial name
- Zapornia pusilla affinis (G. R. Gray, 1845)

Synonyms
- Porzana pusilla affinis

= Zapornia pusilla affinis =

Subspecies of bird

Zapornia pusilla affinis is a subspecies of Baillon's crake endemic to New Zealand. It is also called the marsh crake in English or koitareke in Māori.

== Description ==
The marsh crake is about half the size of a common blackbird, measuring about 15–18 cm (5.9–7.1 in) in length and weighing 30 to 40 g (1.1 to 1.4 oz). It has a short tail and long legs. It is known for its dramatic plumage: the feathers on its back are deep brown with black and white marks. The feathers on its belly are grey and white. Its eyes are bright red. Its beak and legs are green. Young birds have brown bellies instead of grey and white.

== Habitat and distribution ==
Marsh crakes live in wetlands and in reedy estuaries. They can live on flooded pastures and willow forests as well. The species occurs in both the North and South island of New Zealand, but appears to be more numerous in the latter. It is unclear whether the species migrates.

== Diet ==
The marsh crake eats invertebrates and the seeds of water plants. Because of their food requirements, scientists consider them an indicator of wetland health.

== Breeding ==
Marsh crakes form monogamous pairs to lay eggs. The males fly courtship flights to impress the females. They build nests out of dry plants and hide them in sedge. The female lays 5–7 eggs per clutch. Both the male and female crake incubate the eggs. The eggs take 16–20 days to hatch. The chicks have black and brown feathers.

== Threats ==
The population of marsh crake is declining because human beings drain their marshes. Introduced species such as cats, dogs, mustelids, and rats can kill the adult birds, eggs, and chicks. Less often, a marsh crake will be hit by a car or fly into a power line. If human beings make too much noise near a nest, the parent birds may flee, leaving the eggs to die.
