= Ambarijeby =

Ambarijeby Sud
- Location in Madagascar
- Coordinates: 14°56′S 47°42′E
- Country: Madagascar
- Region: Sofia
- District: Analalava
- Elevation: 122 m (400 ft)

Population (2001)
  - Total: 5,000
- Time zone: UTC3 (EAT)

Ambarijeby or Ambarijeby Sud is a town and commune (Malagasy: kaominina) in Madagascar. It belongs to the district of Analalava, which is a part of Sofia Region. The population of the commune was estimated to be approximately 5,000 in 2001 commune census.

Only primary schooling is available. The majority 70% of the population of the commune are farmers, while an additional 10% receives their livelihood from raising livestock. The most important crop is rice, while other important products are sugarcane, maize and cassava. Services provide employment for 3% of the population. Additionally fishing employs 17% of the population.
