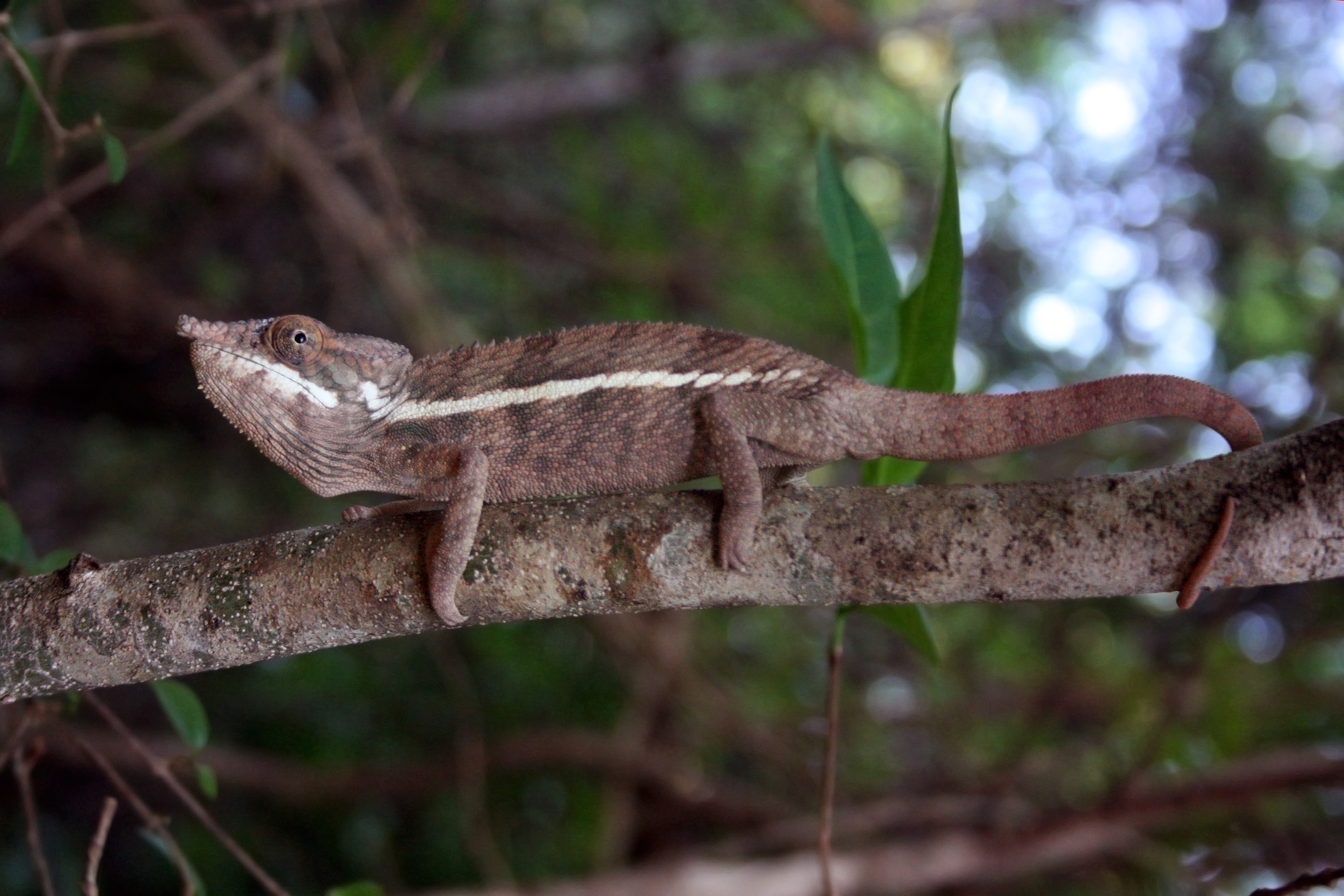
- Anjavy Forest, Madagascar

Conservation status
- Least Concern (IUCN 3.1)

Scientific classification
- Kingdom: Animalia
- Phylum: Chordata
- Class: Reptilia
- Order: Squamata
- Suborder: Iguania
- Family: Chamaeleonidae
- Genus: Furcifer
- Species: F. angeli

Binomial name
- Furcifer angeli (Brygoo & Domergue, 1968)
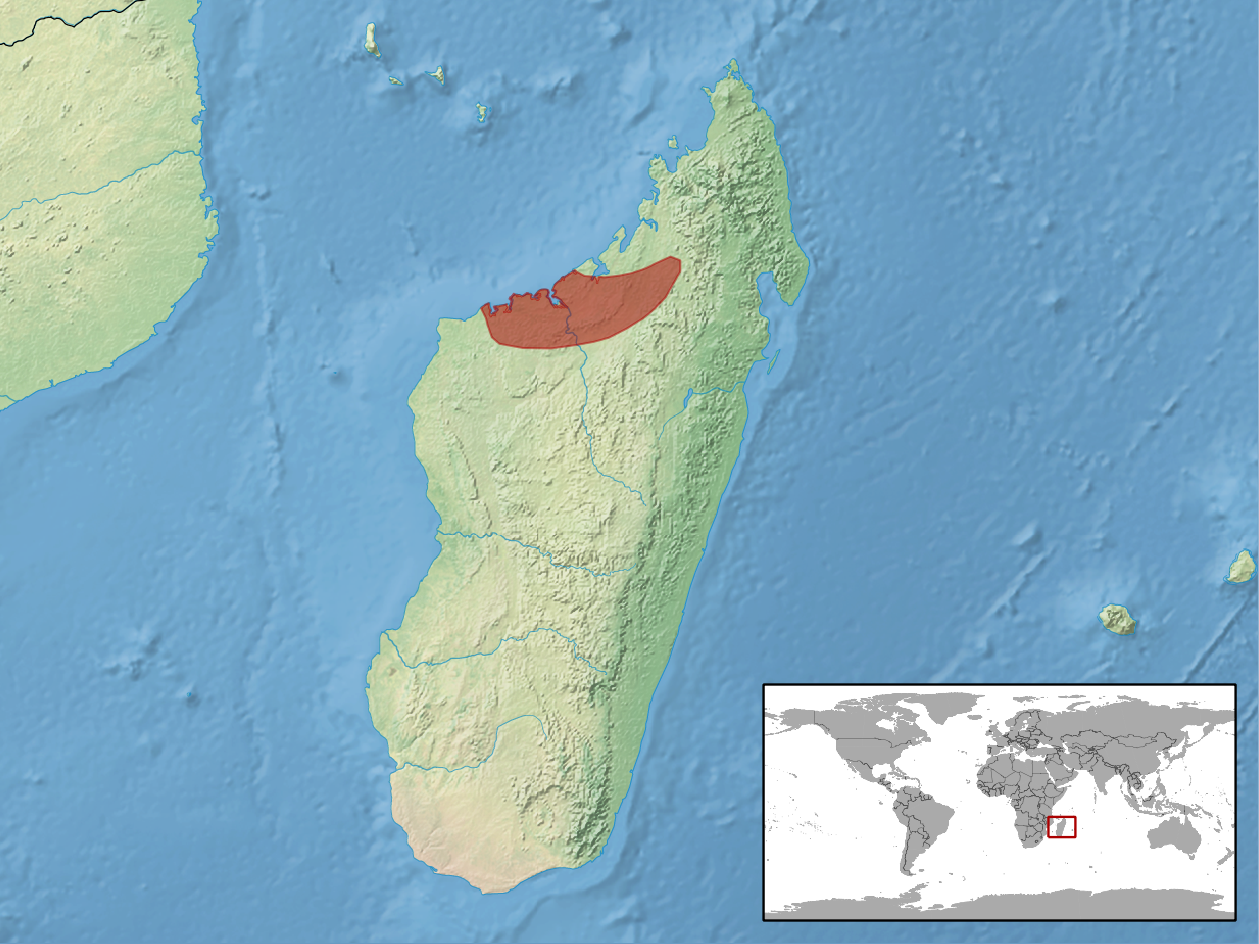

Synonyms
- Chamaeleo angeli Brygoo & Domergue, 1968; Furcifer angeli — Glaw & Vences, 1994

= Angel's chameleon =

Species of lizard

The Angel's chameleon (Furcifer angeli), initially described as Chamaeleo angeli, is a species of chameleon, a lizard in the family Chamaeleonidae. The species is endemic to Madagascar, and was originally described by Édouard-Raoul Brygoo and Charles Antoine Domergue in 1968.

== Etymology ==
The specific name, angeli, is in honour of French herpetologist Fernand Angel.

== Distribution and habitat ==
Furcifer angeli is endemic to Madagascar, and can be found in dry forest at the northwest of the country. It has been found in Bongolava, and between Anjiamangirana I and Namoroka National Park. It has also been reported to occur at Ambohibola and on the coast near Antsanitia in Mahajanga province. It has been found at between 40 and 300 metres (130 and 980 feet) above sea level. It lives in trees in dry forests and is diurnal.

== Conservation status ==
F. angeli is listed as being of Least Concern by the International Union for Conservation of Nature (IUCN). This is because it has a wide range, estimated to cover an area of 31,506 square kilometres (12,165 square miles). Although the natural habitat of this species is virgin forest, it also occurs close to roads and human habitations. The population size is unknown but is believed to be stable. The main threat to this chameleon is the destruction of forest, including illegal logging, slash-and-burn, but also wildfires.

== Description ==
F. angeli looks like a "drably coloured" version of Furcifer pardalis (the panther chameleon). It often has a white stripe down each side and can be distinguished from the otherwise similar Furcifer lateralis by the presence of a spike at the front of its head.

== Taxonomy ==
F. angeli was initially described by Brygoo and Domergue in 1968 as Chamaeleo angeli, but was later transferred to the genus Furcifer. Furcifer angeli is also known as "Angel's chameleon" after the French herpetologist Fernand Angel.
