= Maromandia =

- Location in Madagascar
- Coordinates: 14°13′S 48°5′E
- Country: Madagascar
- Region: Sofia
- District: Analalava
- Elevation: 48 m (157 ft)

Population (2001)
  - Total: 34,000
- Time zone: UTC3 (EAT)

Maromandia is a town and commune (Malagasy: kaominina) in Madagascar. It belongs to the district of Analalava, which is a part of Sofia Region. The population of the commune was estimated to be approximately 34,000 in 2001 commune census.

== Geographie ==
It is situated at the Route nationale 6.

== Education ==
Primary and junior level secondary education are available in town. The majority 60% of the population of the commune are farmers, while an additional 18% receives their livelihood from raising livestock. The most important crops are rice and coffee; also seeds of catechu are an important agricultural product. Services provide employment for 2% of the population. Additionally fishing employs 20% of the population.
