= Analalava District =

- District
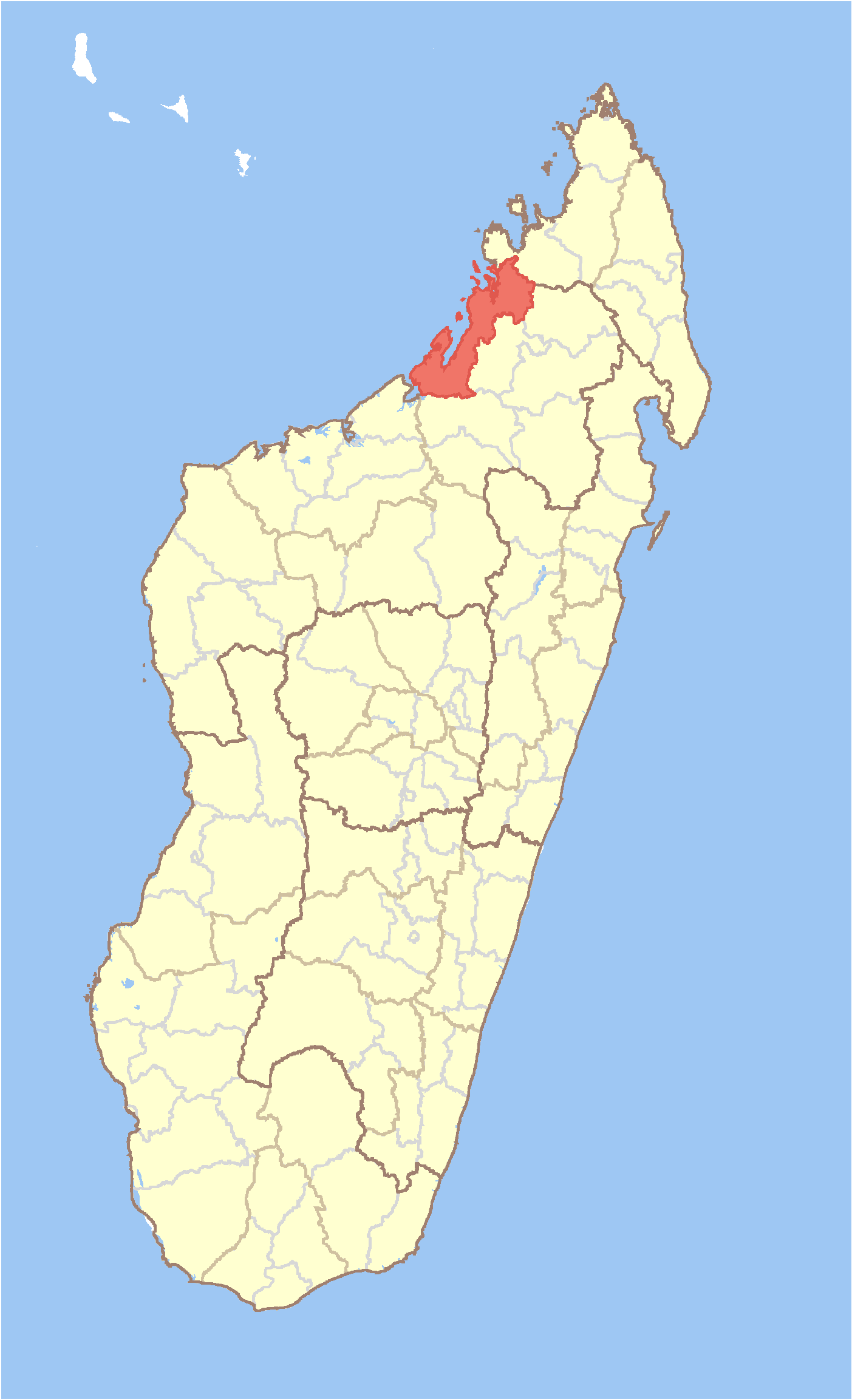
- Location in Madagascar
- Coordinates: 14°34′S 47°54′E
- Country: Madagascar
- Region: Sofia

Area
  - Total: 4,380 km^{2} (1,690 sq mi)

Population (2020)
  - Total: 176,396
  - Density: 40.3/km^{2} (104/sq mi)
  - Ethnicities: Sakalava
- Time zone: UTC3 (EAT)
- Postal code: 405

Analalava is a district in northern Madagascar. It is a part of Sofia Region and borders the districts of Ambanja in northeast, Bealanana and Antsohihy in east and Boriziny (Port-Bergé) in south. The area is 4,380 km^{2} (1,691 sq mi) and the population was estimated to be 176,396 in 2020.

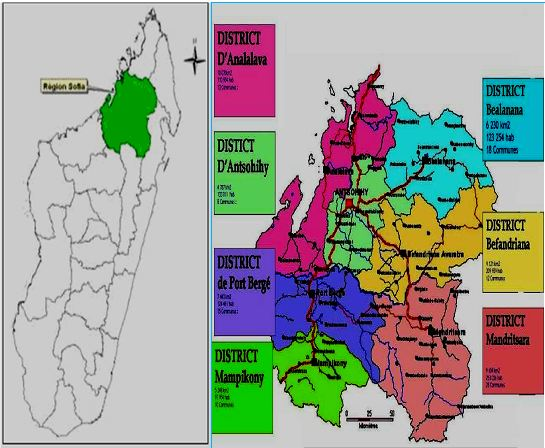
districts of Sofia

== Communes ==
The district is further divided into 11 communes:

- Ambaliha
- Ambarijeby
- Analalava
- Andriambavontsona
- Ankaramy Be
- Antonibe
- Befotaka
- Mahadrodroka
- Maromandia
- Marovantaza
- Marovatolena

== Protected areas ==
- The Sahamalaza - Radama Isles National Park is situated in the municipality of Maromandia.
- Part of Manongarivo special reserve
- Anjajavy protected harmonious landscape at Antonibe
- Nosy Ankingabe protected area
