= Befotaka, Analalava =

Befotaka
- Location in Madagascar
- Coordinates: 14°32′S 48°1′E
- Country: Madagascar
- Region: Sofia
- District: Analalava
- Elevation: 17 m (56 ft)

Population (2001)
  - Total: 17,000
- Time zone: UTC3 (EAT)

Befotaka is a rural municipality in Madagascar. It belongs to the district of Analalava, which is a part of Sofia Region. The population of the commune was estimated to be approximately 17,000 in 2001 commune census.

Befotaka has a riverine harbour. Primary and junior level secondary education are available in town. The majority 65% of the population of the commune are farmers, while an additional 4% receives their livelihood from raising livestock. The most important crop is rice, while other important products are bananas, coconuts and seeds of catechu. Services provide employment for 1% of the population. Additionally fishing employs 30% of the population.

== Geography ==
The next city to Befotaka is Antsohihy at a distance of 63 km. This municipality is crossed by the National road 6.
