= Andriambavontsona =

- Location in Madagascar
- Coordinates: 15°23′8.835″S 47°29′57.385″E
- Country: Madagascar
- Region: Sofia
- District: Analalava
- Elevation: 50 m (160 ft)

Population (2001)
  - Total: 9,000
- Time zone: UTC3 (EAT)

Andriambavontsona (also Andribavontsona or Andrimbavontsona) is a town and commune (Malagasy: kaominina) in Analalava, Sofia.

== Demographics ==
The 2001 commune census estimated the population to be approximately 9,000. Of these, 76% are farmers, 17% are engaged in raising livestock, 3% are in the fishing industry, and 4% are employed in the service industry. Rice, maize, and cassava are important crops for agriculture in the town. The town has facilities for education at the primary level.
