= Fihavanantsika =

Political party in Madagascar

Fihavanantsika is a political party in Madagascar, founded by Daniel Rajakoba in 2002. In the December 2006 presidential election, Rajakoba, the party's candidate, won 0.64% of the vote. Since the 23 September 2007 National Assembly elections it is no longer represented in parliament

== 2023 Presidential elections ==
For the 2023 presidential elections the party supported the candidate Lalaina Harilanto Ratsirahonana who obtained 0.67 % of the votes.
