= Ankaramy Be =

- Location in Madagascar
- Coordinates: 13°59′S 48°12′E
- Country: Madagascar
- Region: Sofia
- District: Analalava
- Elevation: 302 m (991 ft)

Population (2001)
  - Total: 23,000
- Time zone: UTC3 (EAT)

Ankaramy Be (also Ankaramy or Ankaramibe) is a town and commune (Malagasy: kaominina) in Madagascar. It belongs to the district of Analalava, which is a part of Sofia Region. The population of the commune was estimated to be approximately 23,000 in 2001 commune census.

Primary and junior level secondary education are available in town. The majority 90% of the population of the commune are farmers, while an additional 9% receives their livelihood from raising livestock. The most important crop is rice, while other important products are coffee and pepper. Services provide employment for 1% of the population.

Ankaramy Be is the type locality of a type of volcanic rock called ankaramite.
