= Ambaliha =

- Location in Madagascar
- Coordinates: 14°28′S 48°18′E
- Country: Madagascar
- Region: Sofia
- District: Analalava
- Elevation: 269 m (883 ft)

Population (2001)
  - Total: 12,000
- Time zone: UTC3 (EAT)

Ambaliha is a town and commune (Malagasy: kaominina) in Madagascar. It belongs to the district of Analalava, which is a part of Sofia Region. The population of the commune was estimated to be approximately 12,000 in 2001 commune census.

Primary and junior level secondary education are available in town. The majority 72% of the population of the commune are farmers, while an additional 25% receive their livelihood from raising livestock. The most important crop is rice, while other important products are coffee and pepper. Services provide employment for 1% of the population. Additionally fishing employs 2% of the population.
