= Mahadrodroka =

- Location in Madagascar
- Coordinates: 15°18′S 47°16′E
- Country: Madagascar
- Region: Sofia
- District: Analalava
- Elevation: 85 m (279 ft)

Population (2001)
  - Total: 7,000
- Time zone: UTC3 (EAT)

Mahadrodroka is a town and commune (Malagasy: kaominina) in Madagascar. It belongs to the district of Analalava, which is a part of Sofia Region. The population of the commune was estimated to be approximately 7,000 in 2001 commune census.

Mahadrodroka has a riverine harbour. Only primary schooling is available. The majority 65% of the population of the commune are farmers. The most important crop is rice, while other important products are bananas and cassava. Services provide employment for 5% of the population. Additionally fishing employs 30% of the population.
