= Ankaramite =

Type of volcanic rock

- Igneous rock

Composition
- Mafic:pyroxene, olivine and plagioclase.

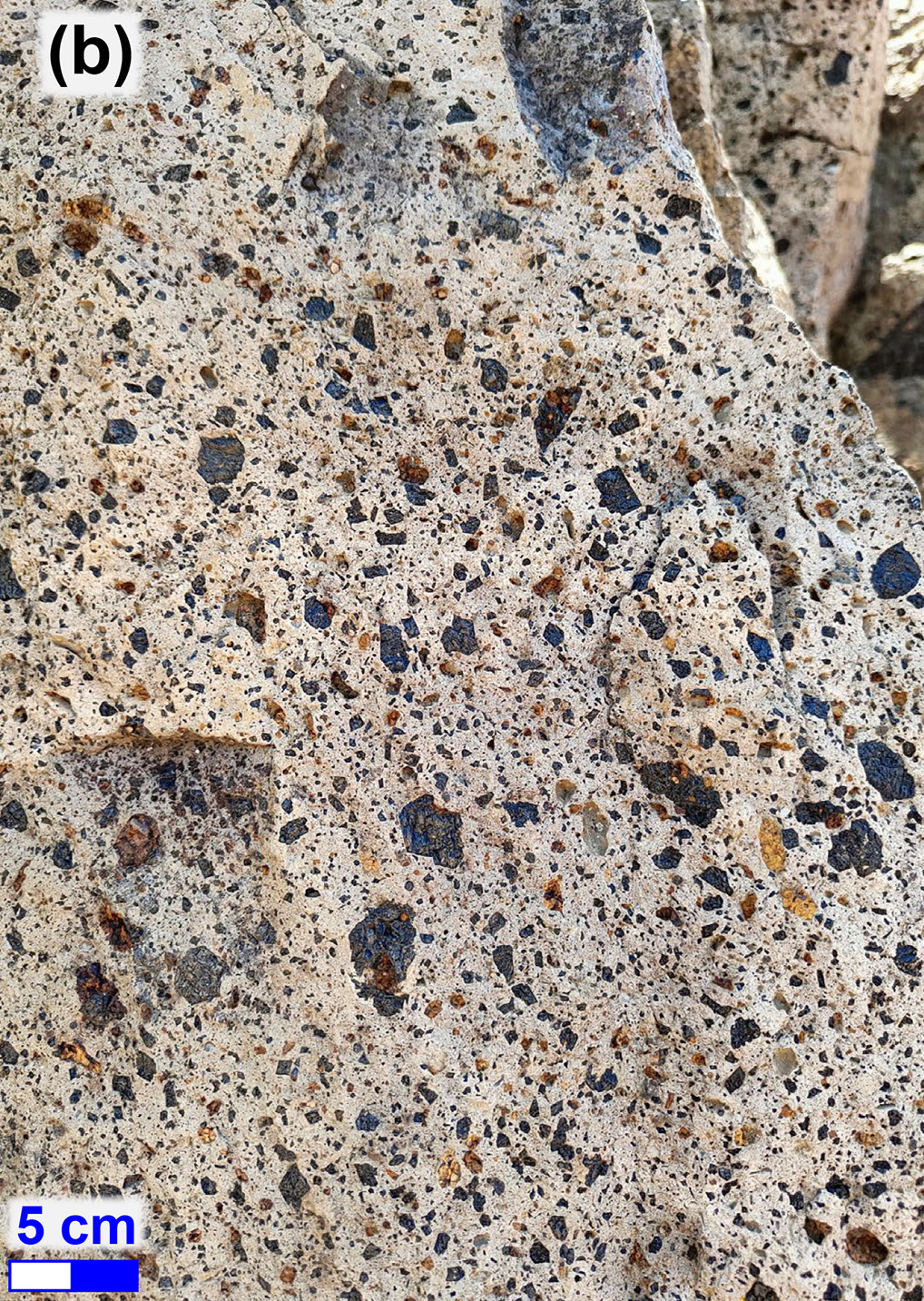
Ankaramite lava flow in the Teno massif, Tenerife

Ankaramite is volcanic rock type of ultramafic composition. It is a dark porphyritic variety of basanite containing abundant pyroxene and olivine phenocrysts. It contains minor amounts of plagioclase and accessory biotite, apatite, and iron oxides.

Its type locality is Ankaramy in Madagascar. It was first described in 1916. It is also found in the Sierra de Guanajuato of Central Mexico, the South Pacific on islands such as Tahiti, Rarotonga, Samoa and in the Zealandia, Alexandra Volcanic Group.
