= Roland Ratsiraka =

Malagasy politician

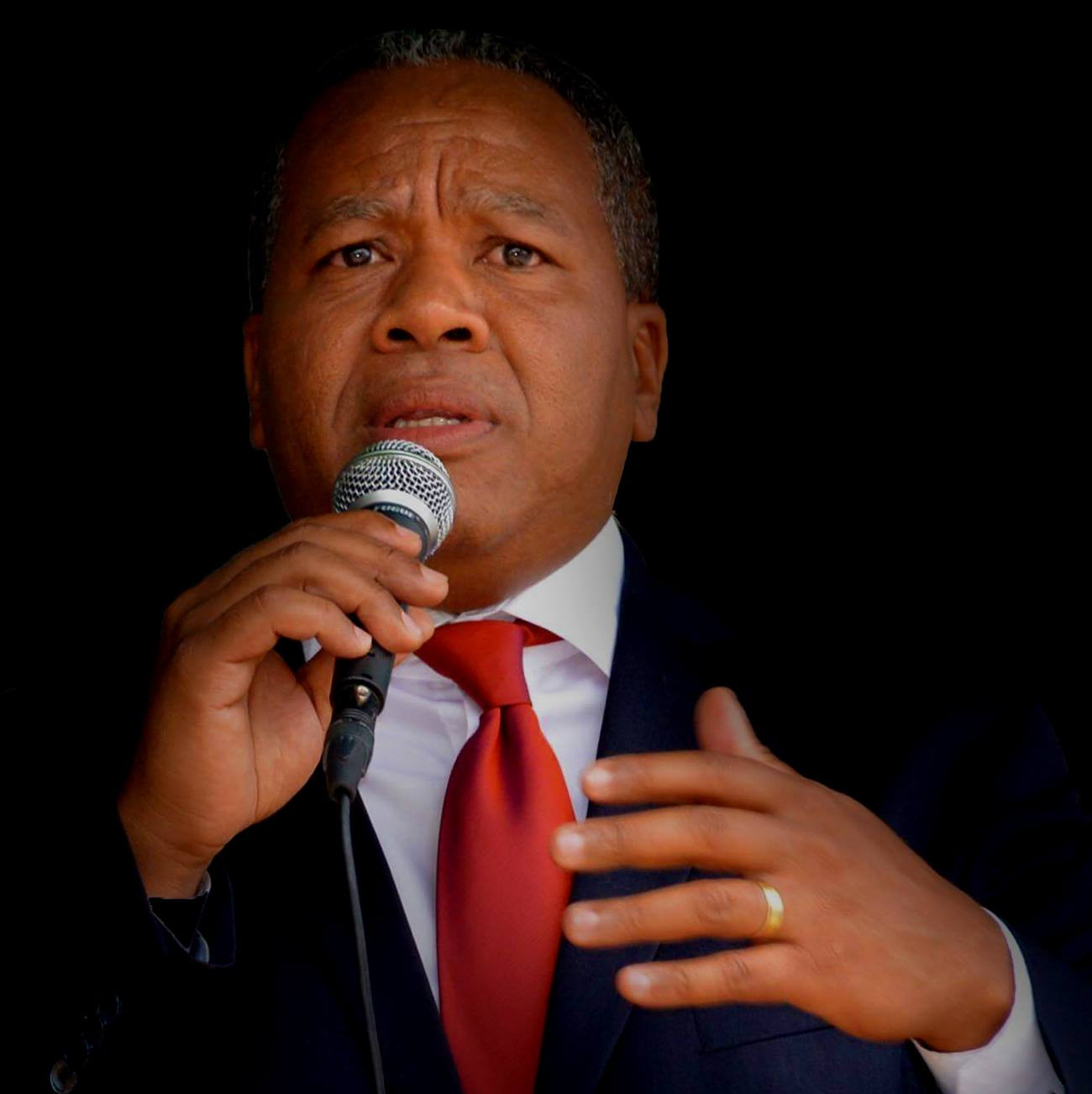
Roland Ratsiraka

Iarovana Roland Ratsiraka (born 15 August 1966) is a Malagasy politician.

In 1966 he was born in Antananarivo. Roland is the nephew of former President Didier Ratsiraka. He studied both in Madagascar and in France, before founding several companies.

In 1996, Roland's uncle appointed him as Campaign Director for the Tamatave region. In 1998, he founded the regional political association Toamsina Tonga Saina (TTS), and was elected to the National Assembly of Madagascar as a Deputy for Toamasina. In 1999, he was elected as mayor of the city, but the post was suspended in 2002.

In the municipal election held on 23 November 2003, Ratsiraka, as the TTS candidate, was victorious, regaining his position as mayor and defeating Barnest Andriamiarantsoa, the candidate of the ruling Tiako I Madagasikara (TIM). His victory was officially announced on 8 December by the provincial electoral court.

Ratsiraka stood in the presidential election held on 3 December 2006, placing third, with 10.14% of the votes cast, according to final results. In his home province of Toamasina, he won 34.74% of the vote, two points less than the winner of the election, incumbent President Marc Ravalomanana. He also received significant support in Antsiranana Province, where he won 20.39% of the vote. Following the release of the provisional results, which showed Ravalomanana winning in the first round, Ratsiraka, along with second place candidate Jean Lahiniriko, said that the results were false, and on December 11 he filed a challenge with the Constitutional High Court regarding the election.

Ratsiraka was suspended as Mayor beginning on 15 February 2007, initially for a period of one month. On 19 April 2007, he was arrested and imprisoned for alleged corruption related to garbage collection. His supporters protested on his behalf in Toamasina, but after looting occurred they were banned from doing so.

On 5 October 2007, Ratsiraka was given an 18-month deferred sentence; he was released on the same day.

President Ravalomanana was forced to resign amidst a political crisis in March 2009, and opposition leader Andry Rajoelina took power. Rajoelina set up the High Transitional Authority (HAT) as the ruling body, and Ratsiraka was appointed as one of the 44 members of HAT on 31 March 2009.
