= 2006 Malagasy presidential election =

- 3 December 2006
- Turnout: 61.93%
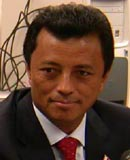

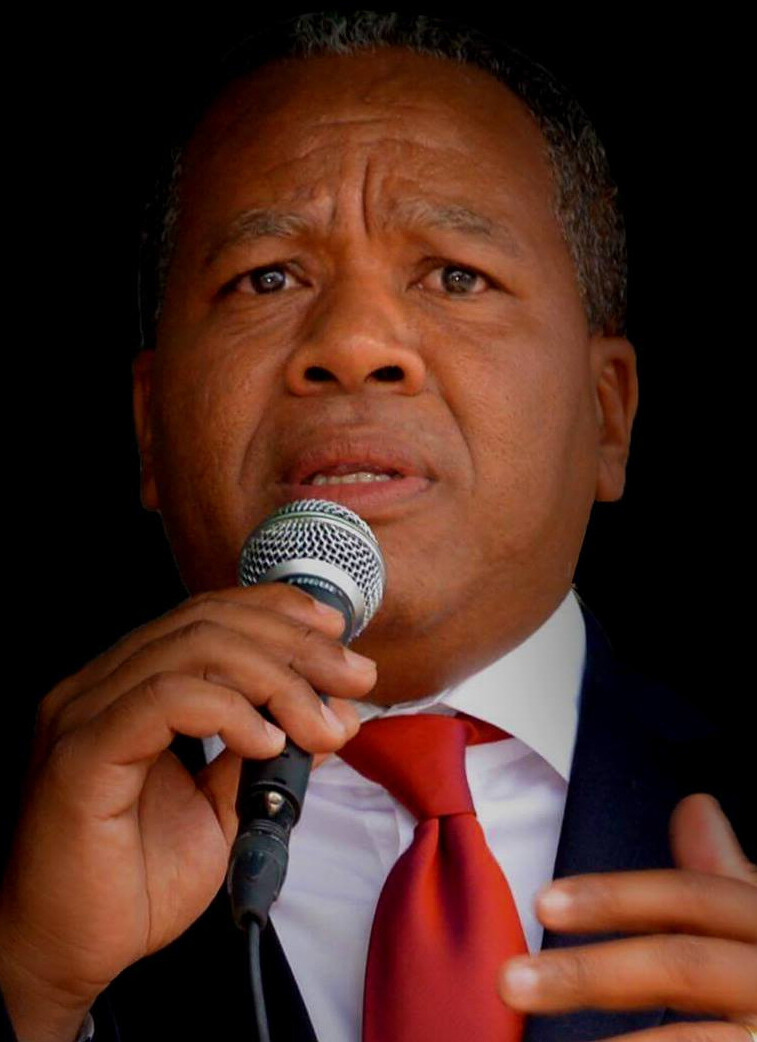

Nominee	Marc Ravalomanana	Jean Lahiniriko
Party	TIM	Independent
Popular vote	2,435,199	517,994
Percentage	54.79%	11.65%
Nominee	Roland Ratsiraka	Herizo Razafimahaleo
Party	Independent	LEADER-Fanilo
Popular vote	450,717	401,473
Percentage	10.14%	9.03%
President before election
Marc Ravalomanana
TIM
Elected President
Marc Ravalomanana
TIM

Presidential elections were held in Madagascar on 3 December 2006. President Marc Ravalomanana, in office since he prevailed in a dispute over election results in 2002, ran for re-election. On 9 December, Ravalomanana was declared to have won in the first round with 55% of the vote.

== Background ==
In May, the date of the election was moved forward to 3 December, several weeks earlier than had previously been expected. The reason given was that the earlier date could avoid having the election affected by bad weather during the rainy season; the constitutional court approved the new date, saying that it did not violate the constitution. The constitution says an election should be held between 30 and 60 days before the end of a president's mandate. Many of the opposition candidates did not like the earlier date and wanted the election to be postponed; they said that the constitution required that the election not be held before 25 December.

== Candidates ==
Exiled former deputy prime minister Pierrot Rajaonarivelo of the AREMA opposition party tried to run for president, and was considered Ravalomanana's main opponent, but he was barred from participation; he was not allowed to enter the country (on one occasion the airport at the eastern city of Toamasina was closed to keep him out, and when he tried again to enter the country he was not allowed aboard a plane in nearby Mauritius), and his registration papers, which he could not sign because he was not allowed into the country, were rejected because he had not signed them himself. During his exile, Rajaonarivelo was convicted of misuse of funds, and he could be arrested if he returns to Madagascar. Fourteen other presidential candidates were approved on 18 October, while three others were rejected for not paying a required deposit.

Aside from Ravalomanana, presidential candidates included former deputy prime minister Herizo Razafimahaleo, former prime minister and acting president Norbert Ratsirahonana, Roland Ratsiraka, nephew of former president Didier Ratsiraka and mayor of Toamasina, and Jean Lahiniriko, who was Speaker of the National Assembly from 2003 until earlier in 2006. One woman also ran for president, Elia Ravelomanantsoa.

In mid-November, retired general Andrianafidisoa, commonly known as Fidy, whose candidacy had been rejected for failing to pay the deposit, had leaflets distributed announcing a military takeover; describing Ravalomanana's government as unconstitutional, he called for the military to support him. This led to a clash at a military base in which one soldier was reported killed, and Ravalomanana's plane, carrying him back to Madagascar, had to be diverted from the capital, Antananarivo, to another part of the country. Subsequently the situation was described as calm and without any sign of a military takeover. A warrant for Fidy's arrest was issued, and Fidy subsequently denied that there had been a coup attempt, calling that a misinterpretation. On 22 November Fidy received the backing of most of the presidential candidates, who said he was defending the constitution and the interests of the nation. A few days after the election, the government unsuccessfully attempted to arrest one of the candidates who backed Fidy, Pety Rakotoniaina, the mayor of Fianarantsoa. The government denied that this was because of his support for Fidy and accused him of other crimes, including holding an illegal gathering the day before the election, after the end of campaigning. Fidy was captured on 12 December; Rakotoniaina was not captured until July 2007.

== Results ==
Results from the capital Antananarivo, Ravalomanana's main support base, were reported first, and they showed Ravalomanana with 70% of the vote. Challengers Norbert Ratsirahonana and Herizo Razafimahaleo had 11% and 7% of the vote respectively; Roland Ratsiraka had about 5%. Subsequent results from almost 14% of polling stations gave Ravalomanana 66%; Ratsiraka held second place with 9% while Razafimahaleo and Ratsirahonana had 7%. Results from 77% of polling stations showed Ravalomanana with 57% of the vote and Ratsiraka in second place with 10%. On 8 December, with votes counted from 82% of polling stations, counting was temporarily suspended due to electrical power problems. On 9 December, with votes counted from 96% of polling stations, Ravalomanana had 55% of the vote and was declared the winner. Jean Lahiniriko was in second place with 11%.

Ballot papers for the candidates Monja Roindefo, Philippe Tsiranana, Ferdinand Razakarimanana, and Manandafy Rakotonirina were not available at polling stations. They had not met the 29 October deadline for submitting the papers and, although they tried to submit them afterward, the government refused to accept them and said that anyone who attempted to distribute ballot papers to polling stations on the day of the election would be arrested.

According to results released by the Interior Ministry of Madagascar on 10 December, a total of 61% of the country's registered 7.3 million voters went to the polling stations, giving Ravalomanana 55% of the vote, 12% for Jean Lahiniriko, 10% for Roland Ratsiraka, and 9% for Razafimahaleo. The figures still needed to be confirmed by the Constitutional High Court to be official. Lahiniriko's campaign director called the results false and said that Ravalomanana had only received about 49%; both Lahiniriko and Ratsiraka said that they were challenging the official results in court.

On 23 December the Constitutional High Court confirmed that Ravalomanana won the election with 55% of the vote. The final official results gave Lahiniriko 12% and Ratsiraka 10%. Ravalomanana was sworn in for his second term on 19 January 2007.

Candidate	Party	Votes	%
Marc Ravalomanana	Tiako i Madagasikara	2,435,199	54.79
Jean Lahiniriko	Independent	517,994	11.65
Roland Ratsiraka	Independent	450,717	10.14
Herizo Razafimahaleo	LEADER–Fanilo	401,473	9.03
Norbert Ratsirahonana	Judged by Your Work Party	187,552	4.22
Ny Hasina Andriamanjato	Independent	185,624	4.18
Elia Ravelomanantsoa	Our Madagascar	113,897	2.56
Pety Rakotoniaina	Union	74,566	1.68
Jules Randrianjoary	Independent	33,463	0.75
Daniel Rajakoba	Fihavanantsika	28,363	0.64
Manandafy Rakotonirina	Movement for the Progress of Madagascar	14,712	0.33
Philippe Tsiranana	Independent	1,128	0.03
Ferdinand Razakarimanana	Independent	41	0.00
Roindefo Monja	Independent	21	0.00
Total		4,444,750	100.00
Valid votes		4,444,750	98.08
Invalid/blank votes		87,196	1.92
Total votes		4,531,946	100.00
Registered voters/turnout		7,317,790	61.93
Source: African Elections Database
