= OMNIS =

Madagascan government organisation

OMNIS, the acronym for Office des Mines Nationales et des Industries Stratégiques (English: National Military Office for Strategic Industries), formerly known as Office Militaire National pour les Industries Stratégiques, is a Malagasy government organisation, operating under the auspices of the Ministry of Energy and Hydrocarbons.

== Functions ==
OMNIS is responsible for:

Hydrocarbons:

- Putting in place and updating the legal framework for upstream oil and gas activities in Madagascar
- Acquisition of technical exploration data (geological, geophysical and drilling)
- Promotion of potentially hydrocarbon-bearing areas
- Management of existing and newly acquired exploration data
- Laboratory analysis of samples (rock, oil and gas)

Mining:

- Promotion of the Malagasy mining sector
- Development of basic sectoral infrastructure relevant to various minerals
- Undertaking of minerals research including energy minerals (radioactive minerals, fossil fuels, etc.)
- Development of and feasibility studies for mining projects, minerals production, etc.
- Assistance and support to national and international mining sector companies
- Promotion of partnership contracts

== Governance ==
As of September 2025 the interim director general of OMNIS is Nantenaina Andry Rasolonirina.
