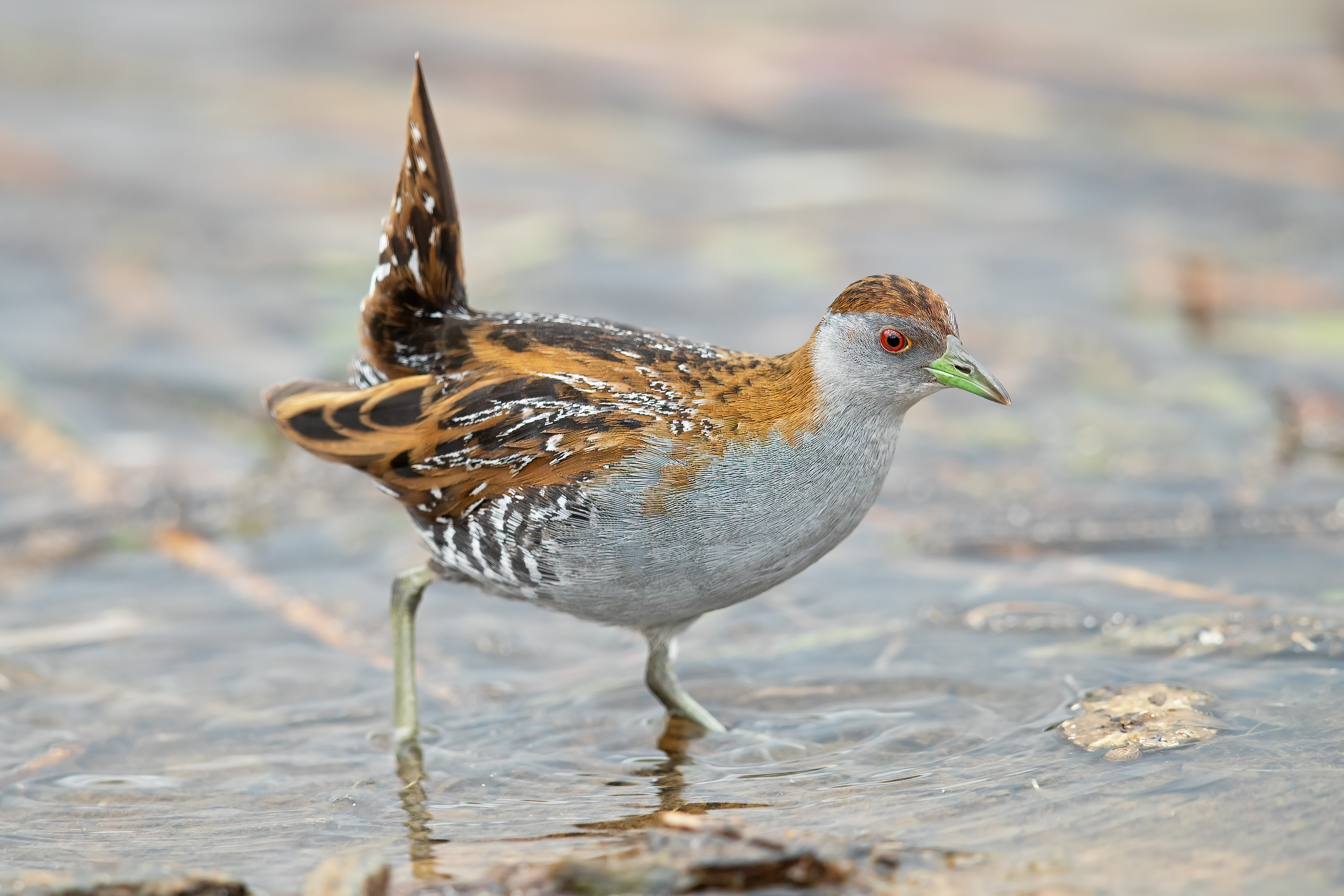

Conservation status
- Least Concern (IUCN 3.1)

Scientific classification
- Kingdom: Animalia
- Phylum: Chordata
- Class: Aves
- Order: Gruiformes
- Family: Rallidae
- Genus: Zapornia
- Species: Z. pusilla

Binomial name
- Zapornia pusilla (Pallas, 1776)
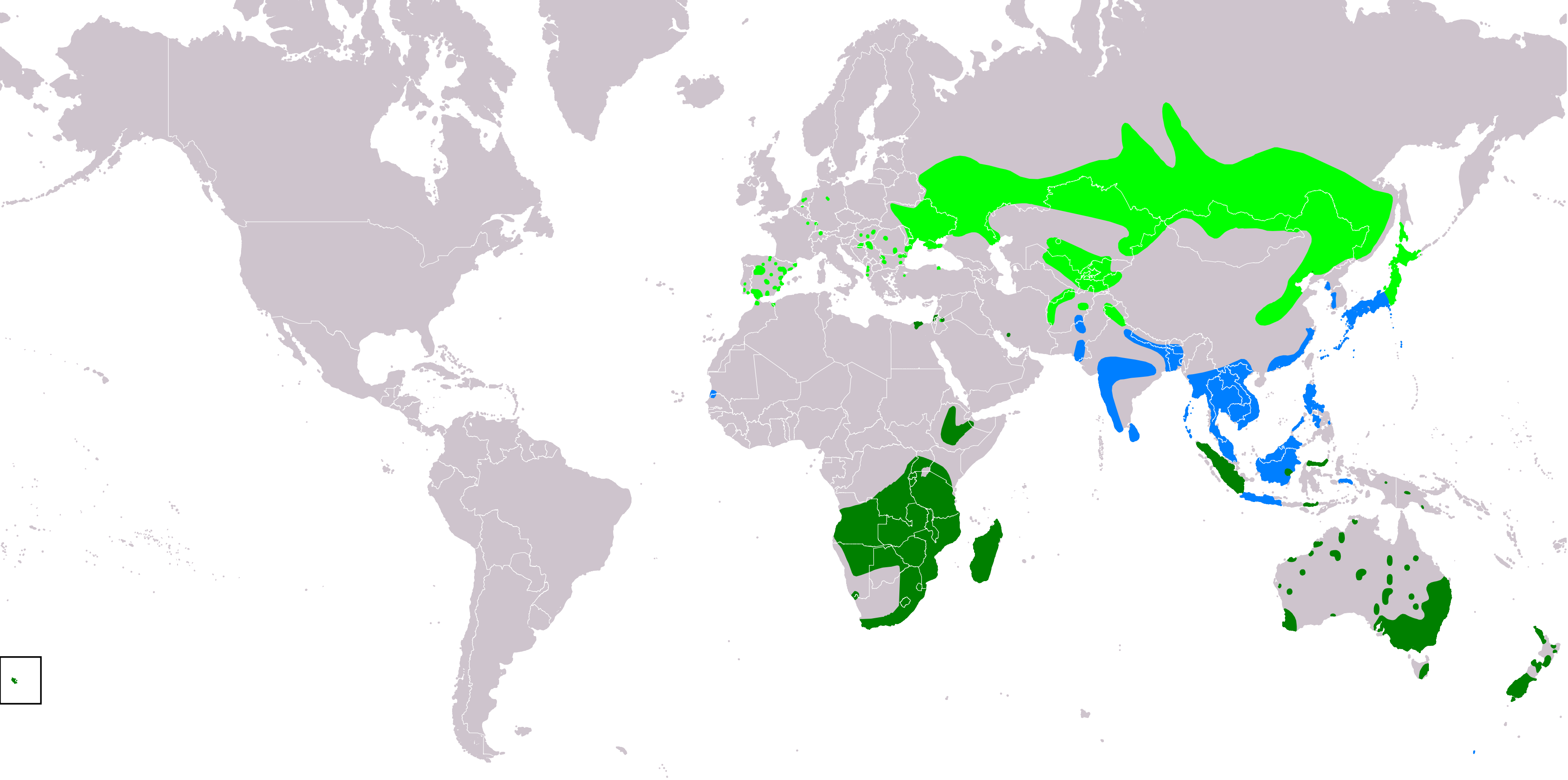
- Range of Z. pusilla Breeding Resident Non-breeding

Synonyms
- Porzana pusilla

= Baillon's crake =

Species of bird

Baillon's crake (Zapornia pusilla), also known as the marsh crake, is a small waterbird of the family Rallidae.

== Distribution ==
Their breeding habitat is sedge beds and swamps, ranging from Eastern Europe to Honshu in Japan. The total breeding population in Europe as of 2016 was suspected to be 4,000 to 9,000 individuals. They used to breed in Great Britain up to the mid-19th century, but the Hungarian population declined in the 20th century due to wetland drainage. There has been a recovery in north-western Europe in recent years, with the recolonisation of Germany and the Netherlands, and breeding suspected in Britain; an Irish record in 2012 was the first there since the 1850s. They nest in dry locations in wet sedge bogs, laying 4–8 eggs. This species is migratory, wintering in East Africa and South Asia, as well as being a resident breeder in Africa and Australasia.

There is a single North American record of this species on Attu Island in September 2000.

=== Subspecies ===
There are at least five subspecies of Baillon's crake:

- Zapornia pusilla affinis in New Zealand
- Zapornia pusilla palustris in Australia and New Guinea
- Zapornia pusilla mira in Borneo
- Zapornia pusilla intermedia in Africa
- Zapornia pusilla pusilla in Asia and other places

== Description ==
Porzana pusilla

They are 15–18 cm (5.9–7.1 in) in length, and are similar in appearance to the little crake. Baillon's crake has a short straight bill, yellow or green without a red base. Adults have mainly ochre-brown upperparts streaked through occasionally with black and white markings. Their underparts are a light blue-grey, paler on the throat, breast and abdomen. The flanks and under-tail are barred black and white. They have olive-green legs with long toes.

Immature Baillon's crakes are similar to the adults, but have extensively barred, duller underparts. The chicks are black, as with all rails.

== Behaviour ==
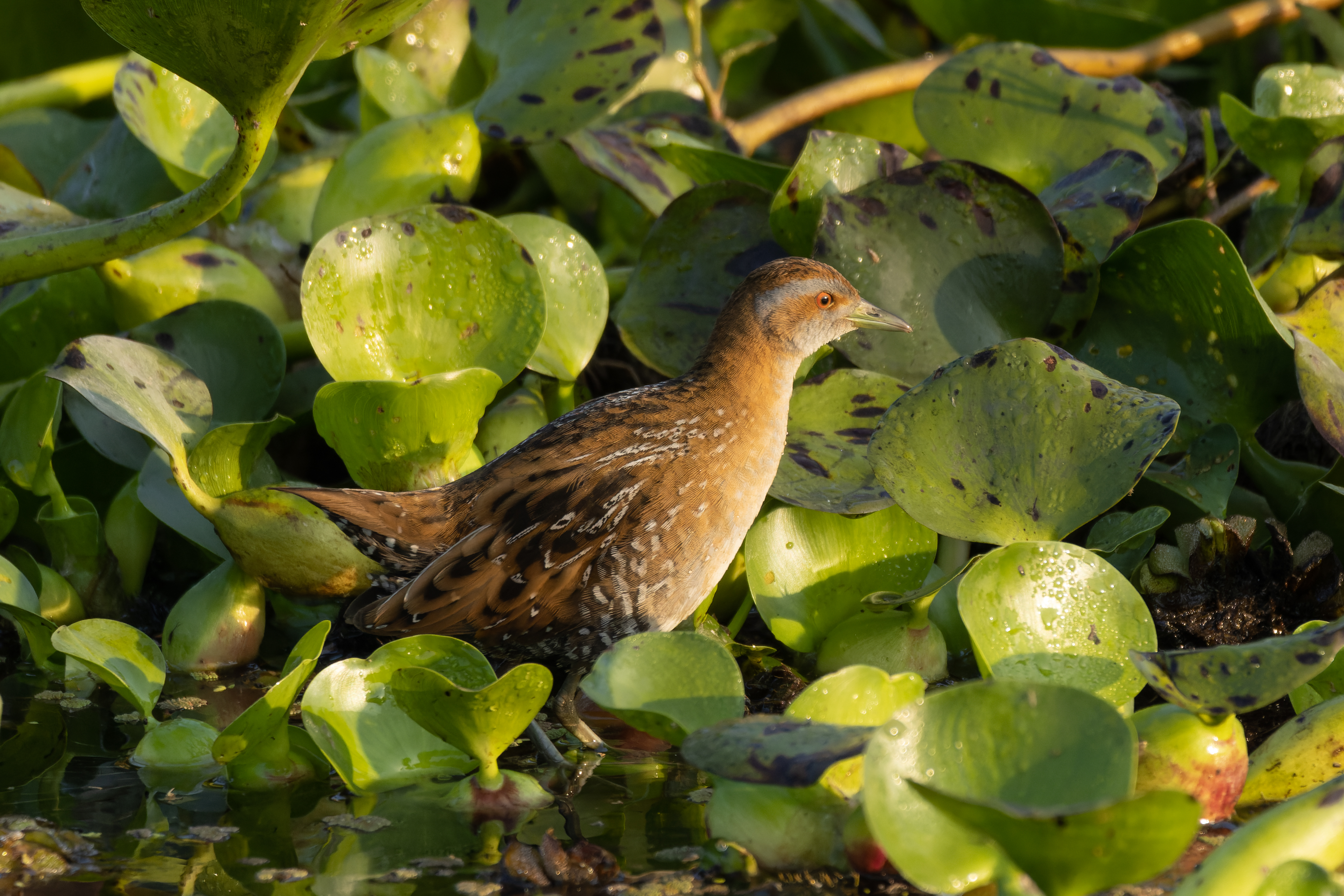
In Baruipur, West Bengal, India.

These birds probe with their bill in mud or shallow water, also picking up food by sight. They mainly eat insects and aquatic animals.

Baillon's crakes are very secretive in the breeding season, and are mostly heard rather than seen. They are noisy birds, with a rattling call like that of the edible frog, or the garganey. They are easier to see when migrating or wintering.

== Taxonomy and nomenclature ==
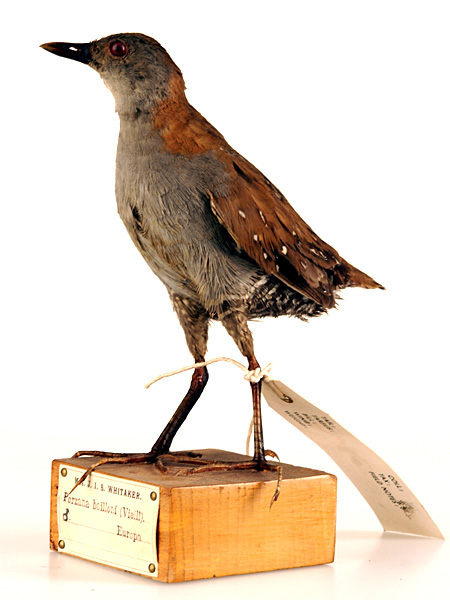
Stuffed specimen

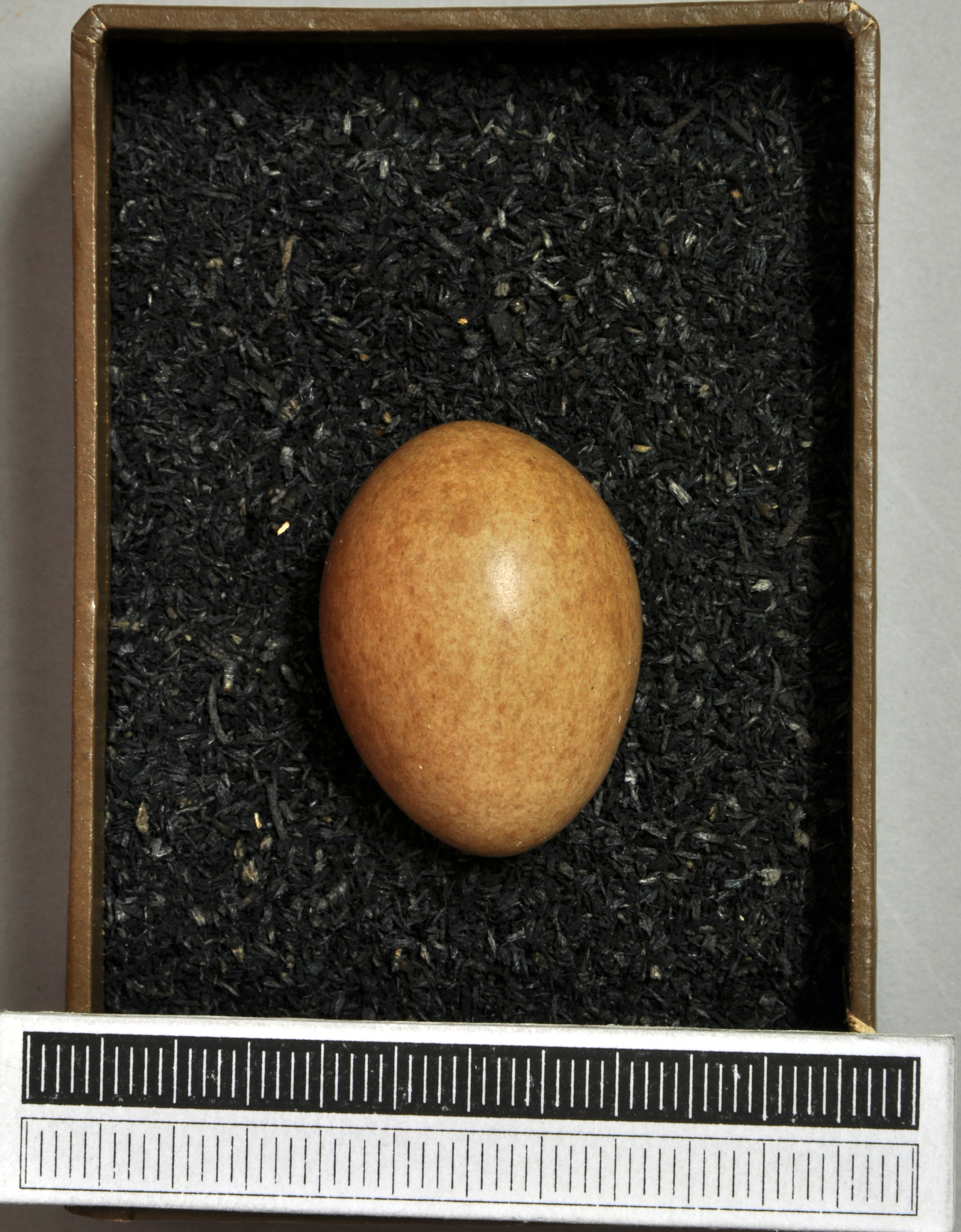
Egg, Collection Museum Wiesbaden, Germany

This bird is named after French naturalist Louis Antoine Francois Baillon. The names marsh crake and tiny crake have previously been used to refer to this species. pusillus is Latin for "very small".

== Status ==
=== International ===
Baillon's crake is one of the species to which the Agreement on the Conservation of African-Eurasian Migratory Waterbirds (AEWA) applies.

=== Australia ===
Baillon's crakes are not listed as threatened on the Australian Environment Protection and Biodiversity Conservation Act 1999. However, their conservation status varies from state to state within Australia. For example:

- Baillon's crake is listed as threatened on the Victorian Flora and Fauna Guarantee Act (1988). Under this Act, an Action Statement for the recovery and future management of this species has not yet been prepared.
- On the 2007 advisory list of threatened vertebrate fauna in Victoria, Baillon's crake is listed as vulnerable.
