= Elia Ravelomanantsoa =

Malagasy politician

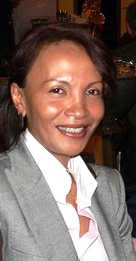
Elia Ravelomanantsoa in September 2006.

Elia Ravelomanantsoa (born 1960) is a Malagasy politician and the director of Synergy-FCB.

Born in Antananarivo, Ravelomanantsoa set herself up in business at the age of seventeen. She founded the Manja festival of fashion in 1986. From 1990 until 1993, she was on the Committee of the Group of Reflection and Action for the Development of Madagascar. In 1996, she founded Democratic Participation for Economic and Social Redress in Madagascar. This had limited success, winning the commune of Moramanga.

In 2004, Ravelomanantsoa was appointed Chair of the Global Congress of Black Women. She is currently president of Femmes entrepreneurs de Madagascar. She is also the vice-president of the French Carrefour des entrepreneurs.

In 2006, Ravelomanantsoa became the first ever woman to stand to be President of Madagascar, when she took part in the presidential election held in December of that year. She took seventh place with 2.56% of the vote.
