= Antonibe =

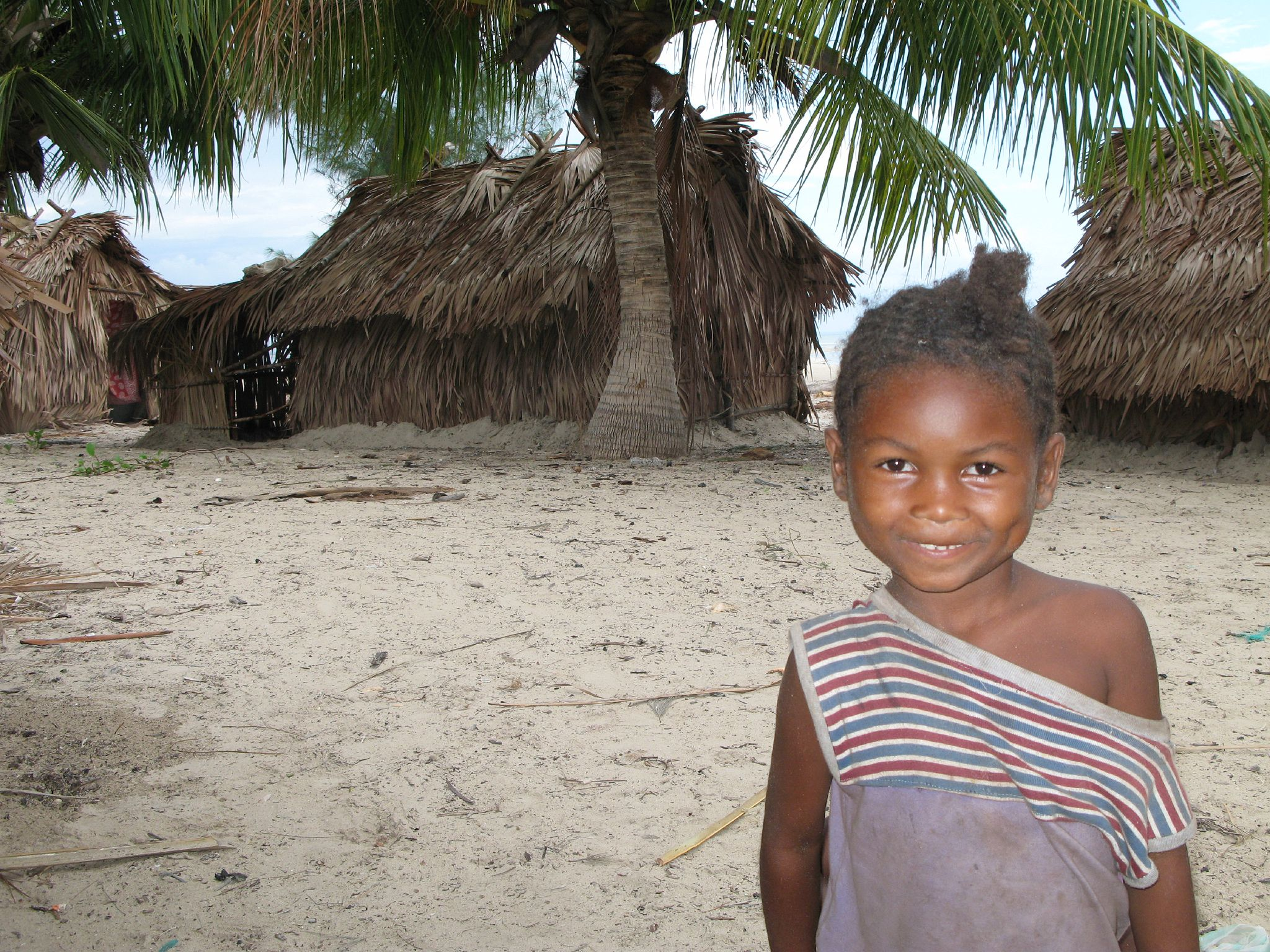
- girl in Anjajavy, a village of this municipality

- Location in Madagascar
- Coordinates: 15°7′S 47°24′E
- Country: Madagascar
- Region: Sofia
- District: Analalava
- Elevation: 17 m (56 ft)

Population (2001)
  - Total: 24,000
- Time zone: UTC3 (EAT)

Antonibe is a municipality in Madagascar. It belongs to the district of Analalava, which is a part of Sofia Region. The population of the commune was estimated to be approximately 24,000 in 2001 commune census.

Antonibe is served by a local airport and riverine harbour. Primary and junior level secondary education are available in town. The majority 60% of the population of the commune are farmers, while an additional 20% receives their livelihood from raising livestock. The most important crop is rice, while other important products are coconuts and cassava. Services provide employment for 5% of the population. Additionally fishing employs 15% of the population.

== Road ==
There is an unpaved provincial road from the RN 6 at Anjiamangirana I.

== Protected areas ==
The Anjajavy Forest.
