= André Avison Tsitohery =

Malagasy politician

Avison André Tsitohery is a Malagasy politician. A member of the National Assembly of Madagascar, he was elected as a member of the Tiako I Madagasikara party in the 2007 Malagasy parliamentary elections; he represents the constituency of Betioky Sud.

He was the chief of the region Atsimo-Andrefana before 2006.
