= Anjiamangirana I =

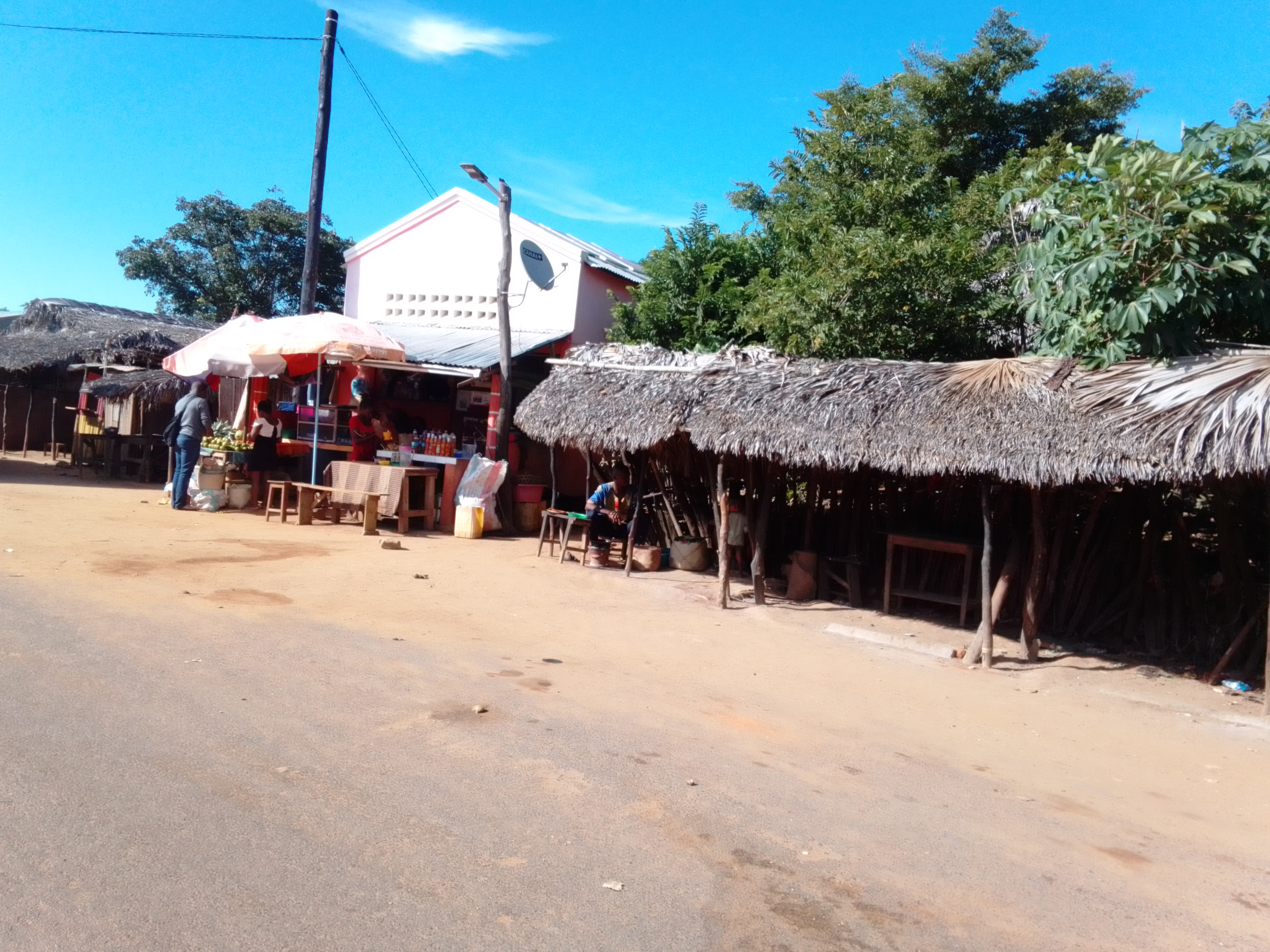
- Anjiamangirana is situated at the RN 6, between Antsohihy and Port Bergé

- Location in Madagascar
- Coordinates: 15°10′S 47°47′E
- Country: Madagascar
- Region: Sofia
- District: Antsohihy
- Elevation: 68 m (223 ft)

Population (2001)
  - Total: 12,000
- Time zone: UTC3 (EAT)

Anjiamangirana I is a rural municipality in Madagascar. It belongs to the district of Antsohihy, which is a part of Sofia Region. The population of the commune was estimated to be approximately 12,000 in 2001 commune census.

Primary and junior level secondary education are available in town. The majority 60% of the population of the commune are farmers, while an additional 30% receives their livelihood from raising livestock. The most important crop is rice, while other important products are peanuts, maize and cassava. Services provide employment for 7% of the population. Additionally fishing employs 3% of the population.

== Roads ==
Anjiamangirana I is situated at the junction of RN 6 and a provincial road to Antonibe and the Anjajavy Forest.
