= Beryozka (Russian retail store) =

Grocery store chain in Soviet Union

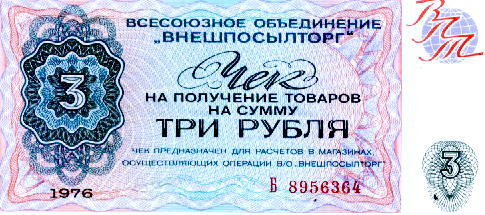
A Vneshposyltorg cheque used for payment in Beryozka stores

Beryozka, or Beriozka, (Russian: Берёзка, lit. "little birch") was the common name of two chains of state-run retail stores in the Soviet Union that sold goods in exchange for foreign currency. Beriozkas sold luxury goods such as chocolate and caviar that were often unavailable or unaffordable in traditional Soviet markets and shops. Beryozka stores existed between 1964 and 1990, up to the point of the Soviet Union dissolution.

== Background ==
From 1921 until 1927 during the New Economic Policy trading of foreign currency in Soviet Union was legal. In 1927 however it became illegal to possess and trade foreign currencies (unless specified by the law otherwise) with a punishment up to six month of imprisonment. Businessmen that were often referred as NEPmen during this period of time were banned from using it in everyday commerce. As result of this policy it became necessary to have places where goods could be purchased for foreign currency. The money were usually spent by workers who earned abroad or by tourists and westerners who visited the Soviet Union.

== Overview ==
The Soviet ruble was not internationally convertible and the government was desperate for foreign hard currency to buy goods and services from abroad. The Beryozka shops were an efficient source of this currency.

One chain belonged to the Vneshposyltorg (Foreign Mail Order Trade) and was intended for Soviet citizens who were paid some of their salary in foreign currency or received remittances from relatives or friends abroad. The foreign currency had to be exchanged for ruble-denominated Vneshposyltorg cheques, either by the recipient or by government intermediaries.

The other chain sold goods directly for foreign currency and for Vneshtorgbank series D cheques. Only foreigners and Party apparatchiks were allowed access to these shops.

Initially the shops only carried the Beriozka branding in the territory of the RSFSR and Kazakhstan. In other republics of the Soviet Union different "national tree" names were used. For example, in the Ukrainian SSR they were called Kashtan (chestnut), Ivushka (a tender diminutive for "iva", willow) in the Byelorussian SSR, Chinara (Oriental plane) in the Azerbaijan SSR, and Dzintars (amber) in the Latvian SSR. Eventually all of these shops rebranded under the Beriozka name. Beriozka stores were present only in the major cities, most prominently Moscow.

There were also separate Albatross stores in Soviet port cities, such as Vladivostok, that sold goods to Soviet sailors returning from abroad. The Albatross stores sold goods for Torgmortrans cheques issued to the sailors by the Merchant Maritime Transport department (Torgmortrans) of the Soviet Ministry of the Maritime Fleet in exchange for foreign currency earned by the sailors.

Beriozka stores were opened in 1964. Their predecessors were Torgsin stores of the 1930s and the highly ineffective Vneshposyltorg departments of the large Soviet department stores (e.g. State Universal Store) that allowed catalog mail order from abroad by customers paying in hard currency.

Beriozka stores became obsolete in the early 1990s when the ruble became convertible with other currencies. The stores were privatized and in the mid-1990s most were closed as uncompetitive.

== Similar chains ==
Many other socialist countries had similar retail chains, such as Intershops in the German Democratic Republic, Tuzex in the Czechoslovak Socialist Republic, Comturist in the Socialist Republic of Romania, Corecom in the People's Republic of Bulgaria, Pewex and Baltona in the Polish People's Republic, Dollar stores in the Republic of Cuba and Friendship Stores in the People's Republic of China, though some of these systems allowed anyone with foreign currency to shop there.

== See also ==
- Eastern Bloc economies
- Torgsin - A predecessor which operated in the 1930's
- Fartsovka
- Friendship store
