= Soviet ruble =

Currency of the Soviet Union (1922)

Ruble
Pубль (Russian) 14 other official names: карбованець (Ukrainian); сўм (Uzbek); сом (Kazakh); рубель (Belarusian); манат (Azerbaijani); მანეთი (Georgian); сӯм (Tajik); рублэ (Romanian); rublă (Romanian); сом (Kyrgyz); rublis (Lithuanian); манат (Turkmen); ռուբլի (Armenian); rublis (Latvian); rubla (Estonian)
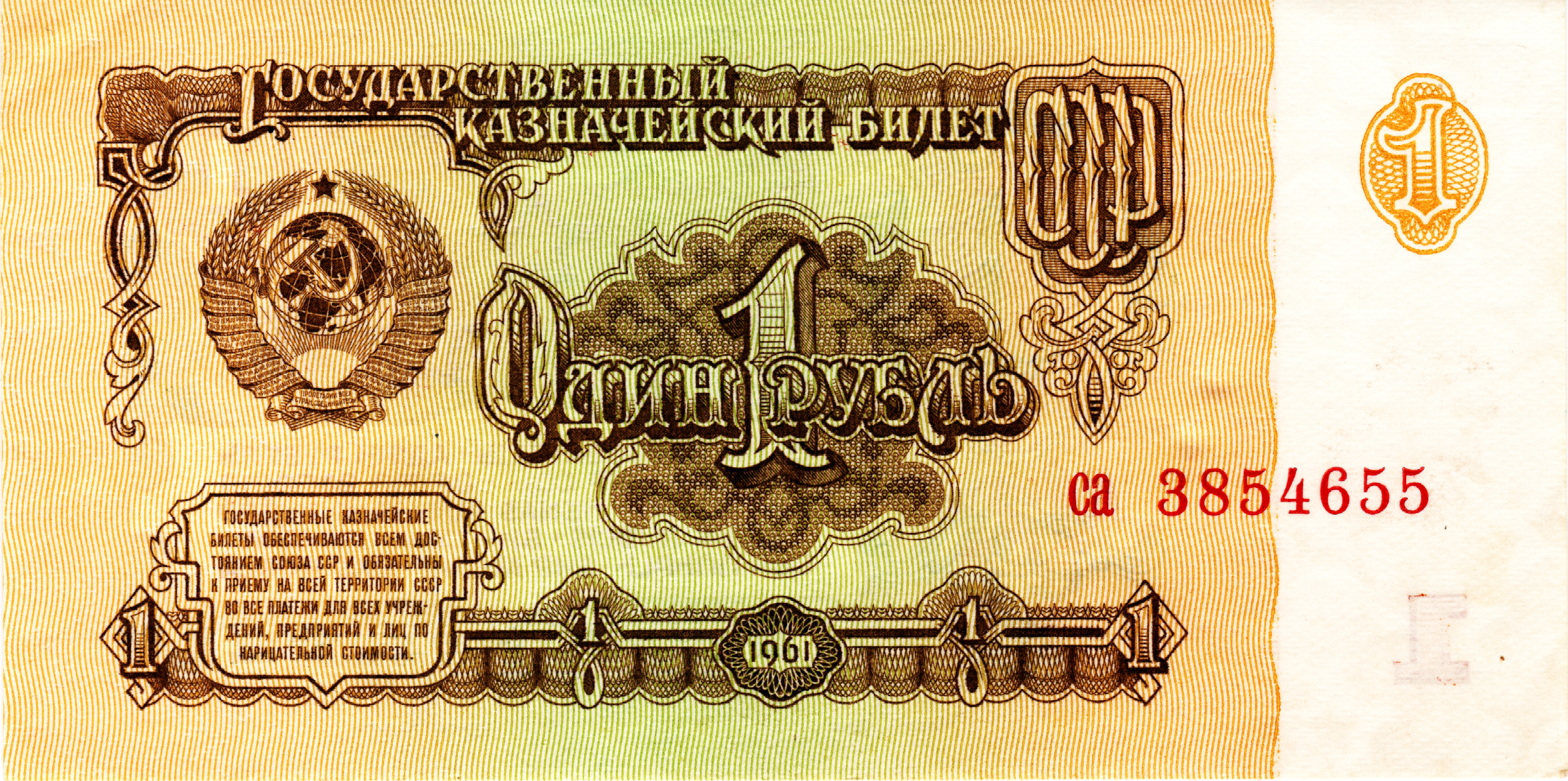
Obverse of Rbl 1 banknote (1961)
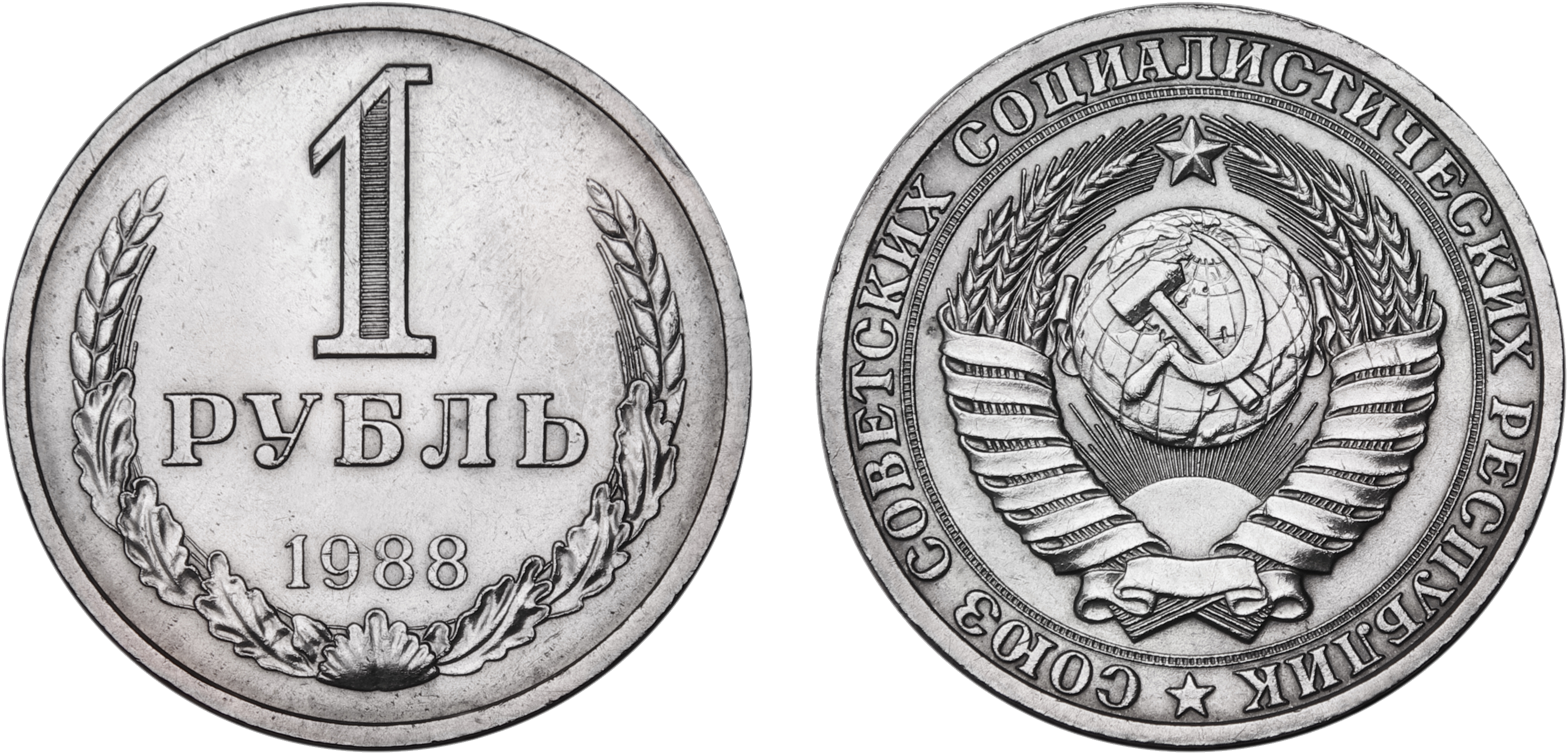
Rbl 1 coin (1988)

ISO 4217
- Code: SUR

Units of account
- Plural: rubli (nom. pl.), rubley (gen. pl.)
- Symbol: руб or р (in Cyrillic); Rbl/Rbls or R (in Latin)
- Subunit
- 1/100: kopeck (копейка)
- Plural
- kopeck (копейка): kopeyki (nom. pl.), kopeyek (gen. pl.)
- Symbol
- kopeck (копейка): коп. or к. in Cyrillic kop., cop. or k (in Latin)

Denominations
- Banknotes: Rbl 1, Rbls 3, Rbls 5, Rbls 10, Rbls 25, Rbls 50, Rbls 100, Rbls 200, Rbls 500, Rbls 1,000
- Coins: 1 kop, 2 kop, 3 kop, 5 kop, 10 kop, 15 kop, 20 kop, 50 kop, Rbl 1, Rbls 3, Rbls 5, Rbls 10

Demographics
- Date of introduction: 1922
- Replaced: Imperial Russian ruble
- Date of withdrawal: 31 December 1993
- Replaced by: Russian ruble and 4 other: see below
- User(s): 1922–1991: Soviet Union; until 1992: Armenia; Azerbaijan; Belarus; Estonia; Georgia; Kazakhstan; Kyrgyzstan; Lithuania; Latvia; Moldova; Russia; Tajikistan; Turkmenistan; Ukraine; Uzbekistan

Issuance
- Central bank: State Bank of the Soviet Union Central Bank of Russia (1992–1993)
- Printer: Goznak
- Mint: Leningrad (1921–1941; 1946–1991); Krasnokamsk (1941–46); Moscow (1982–1991)
- This infobox shows the latest status before this currency was rendered obsolete.

The Soviet ruble or rouble (/ˈruːbəl/; Russian: рубль, romanized: rubl', IPA: [rublʲ]) was the currency of the Soviet Union. It was introduced in 1922 and replaced the Imperial Russian ruble. One ruble was divided into 100 kopecks (копейка, pl. копейки – kopeyka, kopeyki). Soviet banknotes and coins were produced by Goznak in Moscow and Leningrad.

In addition to regular cash rubles, other types of rubles were also issued, such as several forms of convertible ruble, transferable ruble, clearing ruble, Vneshtorgbank cheque, etc.; also, several forms of virtual rubles (called "cashless ruble", безналичный рубль) were used for inter-enterprise accounting and international settlement in the Comecon zone.

In 1991, after the dissolution of the Soviet Union, the Soviet ruble was replaced by the first Russian ruble by 1993, and continued to be used in eleven post-Soviet states, forming a "ruble zone" until 1993.

== Etymology ==
The word ruble is derived from the Russian verb рубить, rubit', i.e., 'to chop'. Historically, a "ruble" was a piece of a certain weight chopped off a silver ingot (grivna), hence the name.

The word kopeck or copeck (in Russian: копейка kopeyka) is a diminutive form of the Russian kop'yo (копьё)—a spear. The reason for this is that a horseman armed with a spear was stamped on one of the faces of the coin. The first kopeck coins, minted at Novgorod and Pskov from about 1534 onwards, show a horseman with a spear. From the 1540s onwards the horseman bears a crown, and doubtless the intention was to represent Ivan the Terrible, who was Grand Prince of all Russia until 1547, and Tsar thereafter. Subsequent mintings of the coin, starting in the eighteenth century, bear instead Saint George striking down a serpent.

== Ruble in the Soviet Union ==
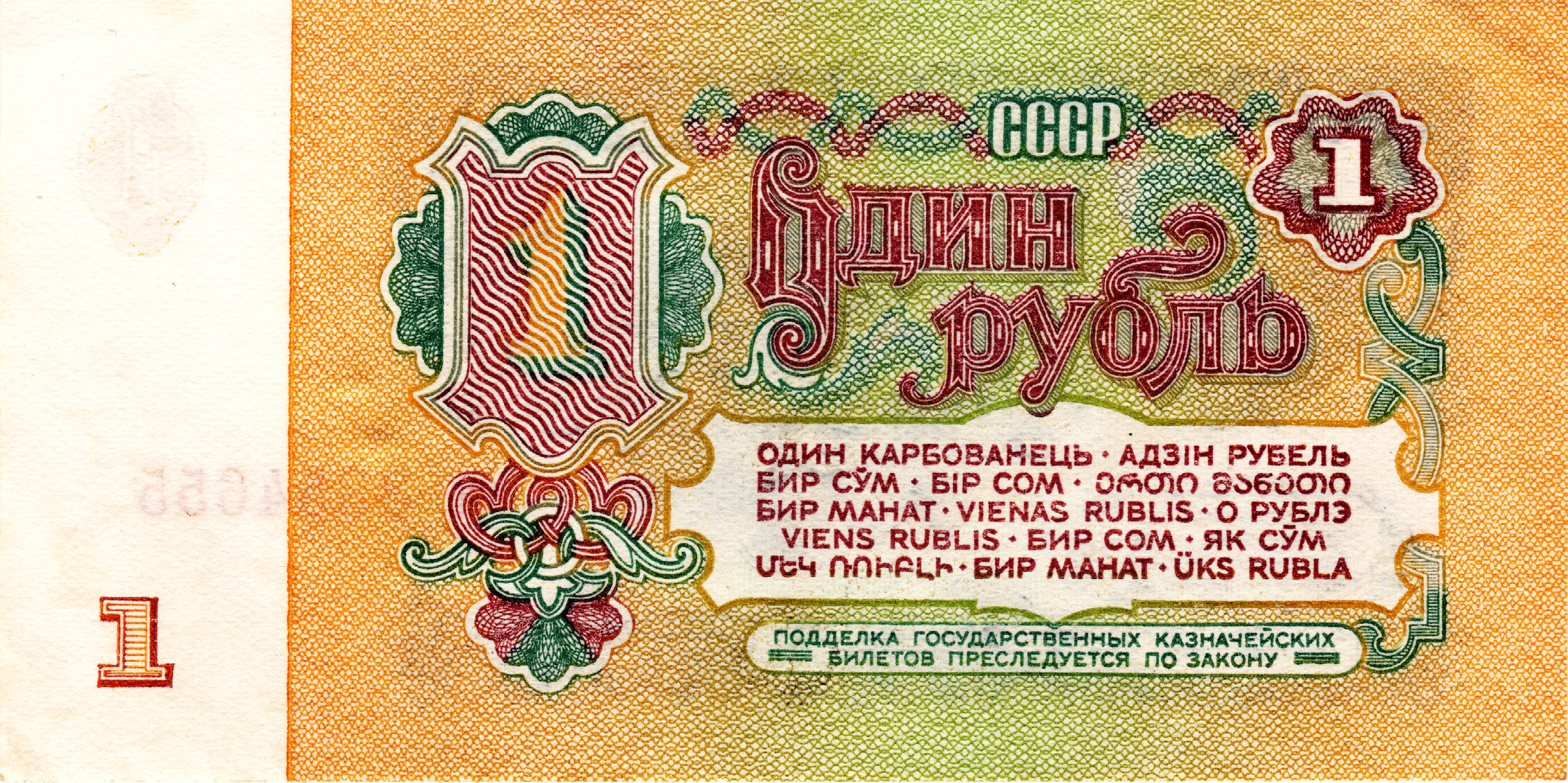
Reverse of the 1-ruble note of the 1961 series, with the value in all the official languages of the Union Republics

The Soviet currency had its own name in all the languages of the Soviet Union, often different from its Russian designation. All banknotes had the currency name and their nominal printed in the languages of every Soviet Republic. This naming is preserved in modern Russia; for example: Tatar for 'ruble' and 'kopeck' are сум (sum) and тиен (tiyen). The current names of several currencies of Central Asia are simply the local names of the ruble.

The name of the currency in the languages of the fifteen republics (plus the Karelo-Finnish SSR), in the order they appeared in the banknotes:

| Language | In local language | | IPA transcription | |
| Language | ruble | kopeck | ruble | kopeck |
|---|---|---|---|---|
| Russian | рубль | копейка | [ˈrublʲ] | [kɐˈpʲejkə] |
| Ukrainian | карбованець | копійка | [kɐrˈbɔwɐnetsʲ] | [koˈpijkɐ] |
| Belarusian | рубель | капейка | [ˈrubʲɛlʲ] | [kaˈpʲɛjka] |
| Uzbek | сўм | тийин | [som] | [tijin] |
| Kazakh | сом | тиын | [swʊm] | [tɪjən] |
| Kyrgyz | сом | тыйын | [som] | [ˈtɯjɯn] |
| Tajik | сӯм | тин | [sɵm] | [tin] |
| Georgian | მანეთი | კაპიკი | [manetʰi] | [kʼapʼikʼi] |
| Azerbaijani | манат | гәпик | [mɑnɑt] | [ɡæpik] |
| Turkmen | манат | көпүк | [mɑnɑt] | [kœpʏk] |
| Lithuanian | rublis | kapeika | [ˈrʊbɫɪs] | [kɐˈpɛɪkɐ] |
| Latvian | rublis | kapeika | [ˈrublis] | [ˈkapɛika] |
| Estonian | rubla | kopikas | [ˈrublɑ] | [ˈkopikɑs] |
| Finnish | rupla | kopeekka | [ˈruplɑ] | [ˈkopeːkːɑ] |
| Romanian | рублэ/rublă | копейкэ/copeică | [ˈrublə] | [koˈpejkə] |
| Armenian | ռուբլի | կոպեկ | [ˈrubli] | [ˈkɔpɛk] |

Note that the scripts for Uzbek, Azerbaijani, Turkmen and gradually Kazakh have switched from Cyrillic to Latin since the breakup of the Soviet Union. Moldovan has switched to Latin and is once again referred to as Romanian. Finnish last appeared on 1947 banknotes since the Karelo-Finnish SSR was dissolved in 1956.

These sixteen names derive from four roots:

- Slavic verb рубить, rubit', "chop"
- Turkic root som, "pure"
- Latin monēta, "coin"
- Old Ruthenian karbuvaty, "carve", "emboss", "mint"

== Historical Soviet rubles ==
=== First Soviet ruble (paper), 1917–1922 ===
The first ruble issued for the Soviet government was a preliminary issue still based on the previous issue of the ruble prior to the Russian Revolution of 1917. They are all in banknote form and started their issue in 1919. At this time other issues were made by the white Russian government and other governing bodies. During that time, the Russian economy suffered from hyperinflation.

Denominations were as follows: 1, 2, 3, 5, 10, 15, 25, 50, 60, 100, 250, 500, 1,000, 5,000, 10,000, 25,000, 50,000, and 100,000 rubles. Short-term treasury certificates were also issued to supplement banknote issue in 1,000,000, 5,000,000, and 10,000,000 rubles. These issue was printed in various fashions, as inflation crept up the security features were few and some were printed on one side, as was the case for the German inflationary notes.

Banknotes: In 1918, state credit notes were introduced by the RSFSR for 1, 3, 5, 10, 25, 50, 100, 250, 500, 1,000, 5,000, and 10,000 rubles. These were followed in 1919 by currency notes for 1, 2, 3, 15, 20, 60, 100, 250, 500, 1,000, 5,000, and 10,000 rubles, and in 1921 with notes for 5, 50, 25,000, 50,000, 100,000, 1,000,000, 5,000,000, and 10,000,000 rubles were added.

=== Gold ruble (chervonets), 1921–1924 ===
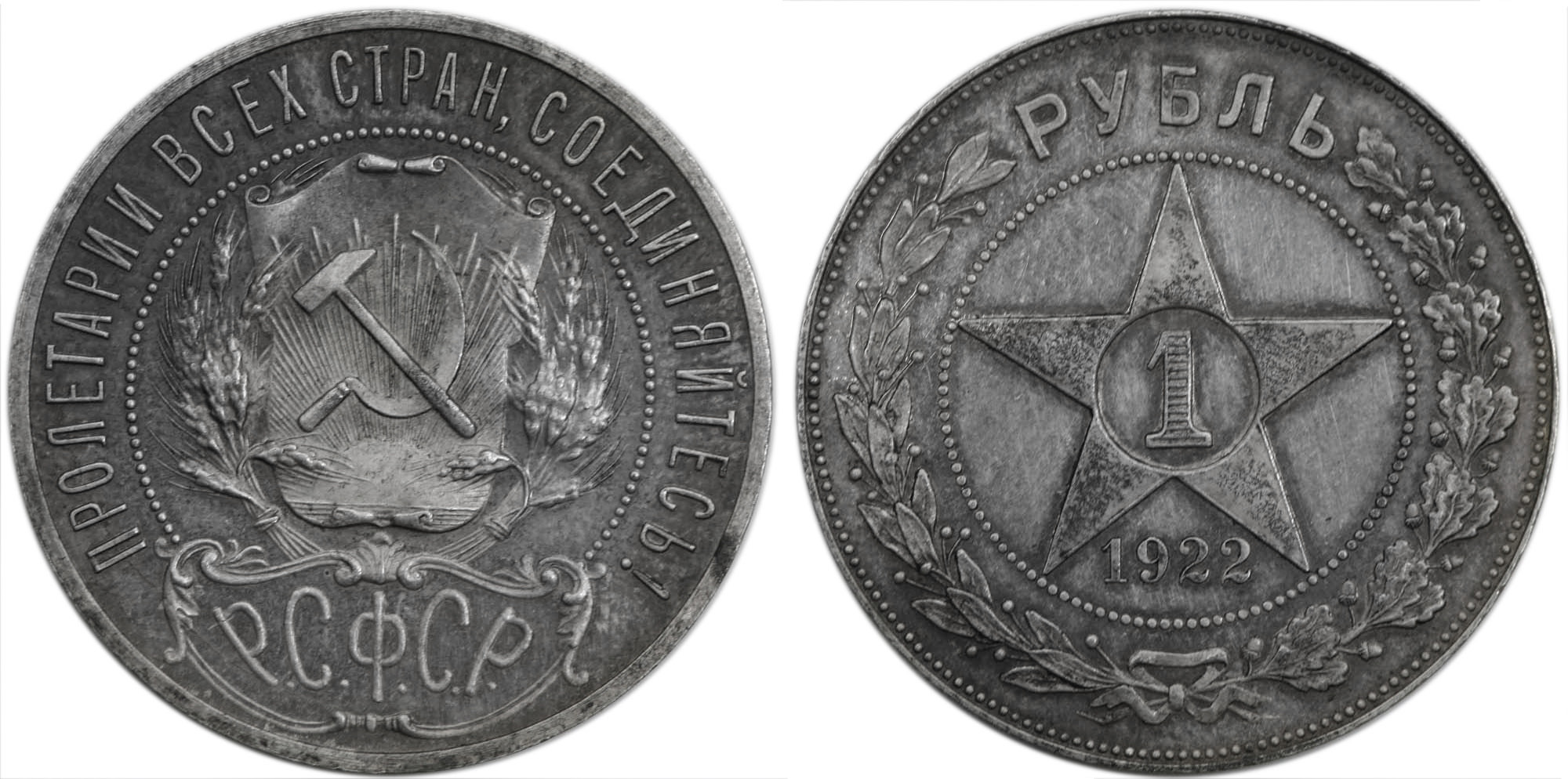
Silver ruble of 1922

Upon launch of the New Economic Policy in 1921 came efforts to revive as currency and accounting unit the pre-war gold standard ruble, equal to 1/10 of a chervonets (with Rbls 10. equal to 8.602 g of 90% fine gold, then equal to US$5.14). The gold ruble existed in parallel with the paper ruble of 1917–1922, which continued to depreciate versus the former, climbing to 50 billion paper rubles per gold ruble in March 1924.

Coins: The first coinage after the Russian Civil War was minted in 1921–1923 according to pre-war Tsarist standards, with silver coins of 10, 15 and 20 kopecks minted in 50% silver, 50 kopecks ("poltinnik" or 1/2 ruble) and 1 ruble in 90% silver, and 10 rubles (one chervonets) in 90% gold. These coins bore the emblem and legends of the RSFSR (Russian Soviet Federative Socialist Republic) and depicted the famous slogan, "Workers of the world, Unite!". These coins would continue to circulate after the RSFSR was consolidated into the USSR with other Soviet Republics until the discontinuation of silver coinage in 1931.

=== Third Soviet ruble, 1 January 1923 – 6 March 1924 ===
The third Soviet ruble was issued equal to 1,000,000 paper rubles of 1917–1922, simply to handle the unwieldiness over the number of digits in the first currency. Again it continued to depreciate versus the gold ruble until the latter climbed to Rbls 50,000 in 1924. Only paper money was issued, in the form of state currency notes in denominations of 50 kopecks and 1, 5, 10, 25, 50, 100, 250, 500, 1,000, 5,000, and 10,000 rubles.

In early 1924, just before the next redenomination, the first paper money was issued in the name of the USSR, featuring the state emblem with six bands around the wheat, representing the languages of the then four constituent republics of the Union: Russian SFSR, Transcaucasian SFSR (Azerbaijani, Armenian, and Georgian), Ukrainian SSR and Byelorussian SSR. They were dated 1923 and were in denominations of 10,000, 15,000, and 25,000 rubles.

=== Fourth Soviet ruble, 7 March 1924 – 1947 ===
After Joseph Stalin's consolidation of power following the death of Lenin, a final redenomination occurred which replaced all previously issued currencies. The fourth Soviet ruble was equal to 50,000 rubles of the third issue, or 50 billion paper rubles of the first issue, and began at par with the gold ruble (1/10 chervonets). It built on the stability in the exchange value of the third ruble which happened towards the end of 1923.

Coins began to be issued again in 1924, while paper money was issued in rubles for values below 10 rubles and in chervontsy for higher denominations. No chervontsy were issued in gold, just decrees on the parity of circulating rubles with the gold ruble, which already failed to take hold as early as 1925.

==== Coins, 1924–1961 ====
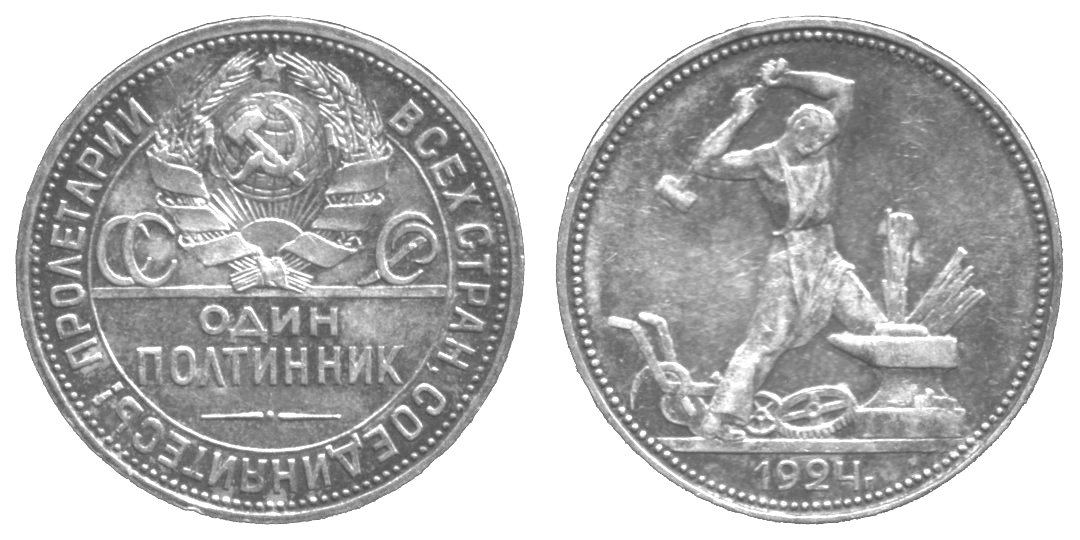
1924 poltinnik (Rbl 1/2)

In 1924, copper and silver coins were again minted to pre-war Tsarist standards, in denominations of 1/2, 1, 2, 3 and 5 kopecks in copper, 10, 15 and 20 kopecks in 50% silver, and 50 kopecks and 1 ruble in 90% silver. From this issue onward, the coins were minted in the name of the USSR (Union of the Soviet Socialist Republics). The "Workers of the World" slogan was carried forward. Coins issued 1921–1923 representing the gold ruble continued to circulate at par with this post-1924 ruble.

Copper coins were minted in two types; plain edge and reeded edge, with the plain-edged types being the fewest in number. The 1 Rbl coin was only issued in 1924, the poltinnik (or Rbl 1/2) was issued 1924–27, and the denga (or 1/2 kop) was issued from 1925 to 1928. In 1926, smaller aluminium-bronze coins were minted to replace the large copper ones (1 to 5 kopecks), but were not released until 1928. The larger coins were then melted down.

Stalin failed to maintain the ruble's value versus the gold ruble as early as 1925, and by 1930 its value even struggled to stay above the melt value of the silver 10-, 15- and 20-kopeck coins. Soviet authorities scapegoated "hoarders" and "exchange speculators" as responsible for the shortages, and confiscatory measures were taken. In 1931, the remaining silver coins were replaced with redesigned cupro-nickel coins depicting a male worker holding up a shield which contained the denominations of each. All silver coins were to be returned and melted down.

1926 and 1931 issues
| Image | Value | Diameter | Mass | Minted |
|---|---|---|---|---|
| | 1 kop | 15 | 1 | 1926–1935 |
| | 2 kop | 18 | 2 | 1926–1935 |
| | 3 kop | 22 | 3 | 1926–1935 |
| | 5 kop | 25 | 5 | 1926–1935 |
| | 10 kop | 17,27 | 1,8 | 1931–1934 |
| | 15 kop | 19,56 | 2,7 | 1931–1934 |
| | 20 kop | 21,84 | 3,6 | 1931–1934 |

In 1935, the reverse of the 10-, 15- and 20-kopeck coins were redesigned again with a simpler Art Deco-inspired design, with the obverse of all denominations also redesigned, having the "Workers of the world, unite!" slogan dropped. The change of the obverse designs did not affect the smaller coins immediately, as some 1935 issues bore the "Workers of the World" design while some bore the new "СССР" design. The state emblem also went through a series of changes between 1935 and 1957 as new Soviet republics were added or created, this can be noted by the number of "ribbons" wrapped around the wheat sheaves. This coin series remained in circulation during and after the monetary reform of 1947 and was finally discontinued in 1961.

1935 issue
| Image | Value | Diameter | Mass | Minting |
|---|---|---|---|---|
| | 1 kop | 15 | 1 | 1935–1941 1945–1946 1948–1957 |
| | 2 kop | 18 | 2 | 1935–1941 1945–1946 1948–1957 |
| | 3 kop | 22 | 3 | 1935–1941 1943 1945–1946 1948–1957 |
| | 5 kop | 25 | 5 | 1935–1941 1943 1945–1946 1948–1957 |
| | 10 kop | 17,27 | 1,8 | 1935–1946 1948–1957 |
| | 15 kop | 19,56 | 2,7 | 1935–1946 1948–1957 |
| | 20 kop | 21,84 | 3,6 | 1935–1946 1948–1957 |

In August 1941, the wartime emergency prompted the minting facilities to be evacuated from the Neva district in Moscow and relocated to Permskaya Oblast as German forces continued to advance eastward. It only became possible to resume coin production in the autumn of 1942, for one year the country was using coins made before the war. Furthermore, the coins were made of what had suddenly become precious metals – copper and nickel, which were needed for the defense industry. This meant many coins were being produced in only limited quantities, with some denominations being skipped altogether until the crisis finally abated in late 1944. These disruptions led to severe coin shortages in many regions. Limits were put in place on how much change could be carried in coins with limits of 3 Rbls for individuals and 10 Rbls for vendors to prevent hoarding as coins became increasingly high in demand. Only high inflation and wartime rationing helped ease pressure significantly. In some instances, postage stamps and coupons were being used in place of small denomination coins. It was not until 1947 that there were finally enough coins in circulation to meet economic demand and restrictions could be eased.

==== Banknotes, 1924–1947 ====
In 1924, state currency notes were introduced for 1, 3, and 5 gold rubles (рубль золотом). These circulated alongside the chervonets notes introduced in 1922 by the State Bank in denominations of 1, 3, 5, 10 and 25 chervontsy. State Treasury notes replaced the state currency notes after 1928. In 1938, new notes were issued for 1, 3 and 5 rubles, dropping the word "gold".

1938 Series
| Image | Denomination | Obverse | Reverse |
|---|---|---|---|
| | Rbl 1 | Miner | |
| | Rbls 3 | Soldiers | |
| | Rbls 5 | Pilot | |
| | 1 чрв | Lenin | |
| | 3 чрв | Lenin | |
| | 5 чрв | Lenin | |
| | 10 чрв | Lenin | |

=== Fifth Soviet ruble, 1947–1961 ===
Following World War II, the Soviet government implemented a confiscatory redenomination of its currency (decreed on December 14, 1947) to reduce the amount of money in circulation. The main purpose of this change was to prevent peasants who had accumulated cash by selling food at wartime prices from using this to buy consumer goods as the postwar recovery took hold. Old rubles were revalued at one tenth of their face value. This mainly affected paper money in the hands of private individuals. Amounts of Rbls 3,000 or less in individual private bank accounts were not revalued, while salaries remained the same. This revaluation coincided with the end of wartime rationing and efforts to lower prices and curtail inflation, though the effects in some cases actually resulted in higher inflation. Unlike other reforms, this one did not affect coins.

==== Banknotes ====
In 1947, State Treasury notes were introduced in denominations of 1, 3 and 5 rubles, along with State Bank notes for denominations of 10, 25, 50 and 100 rubles. The State Bank notes depicted Lenin while the Treasury notes depicted floral artistic designs. All denominations were colored and patterned in a similar fashion to late Tsarist notes.

In 1957, all these notes were reissued with the old date but modified design: following the abolition of the Karelo-Finnish SSR, the number of ribbons on the state emblem was reduced from 16 to 15, and the nominal in Finnish was removed from the obverse.

1947 Series
| Image | Denomination | Obverse | Reverse |
|---|---|---|---|
| | Rbl 1 | State Emblem of the Soviet Union | |
| | Rbls 3 | State Emblem of the Soviet Union | |
| | Rbls 5 | State Emblem of the Soviet Union | |
| | Rbls 10 | Vladimir Lenin | |
| | Rbls 25 | Vladimir Lenin | |
| | Rbls 50 | Vladimir Lenin | |
| | Rbls 100 | Vladimir Lenin | Moscow Kremlin |

=== Sixth Soviet ruble, 1961–1991, (Identified as ISO code SUR) ===
The 1961 redenomination introduced 1 new ruble equal to 10 old rubles and restated all wages, prices and financial records into new rubles. It differed from the confiscatory nature of the 1947 reform when banknotes were reduced to 1/10 of their value but wages and prices remained the same. Its parity to the US dollar underwent a devaluation, however, from US$1 = 4 old rubles (0.4 new ruble) to US$1 = 0.9 new ruble (or 90 kopecks). It implies a gold parity of Rbls 31.50 per troy ounce or Rbl 1 = 0.987412 gram of gold, but this exchange for gold was never available to the general public. Banknotes and coins of this series were designed by Ivan Dubasov.

==== Coins ====
Two Rbls 10 coins introduced in 1978 to commemorate the 1980 Summer Olympics

The 1958 pattern series: by 1958, plans for a monetary reform were underway and a number of coin pattern designs were being experimented with before implementation. The most notable of these was the 1958 series, in denominations of 1, 2, 3 and 5 kopecks in copper-zinc, and 10, 15, 20 and 50 kopecks and 1, 3 and 5 rubles in copper nickel. These coins all had the same basic design and became the most likely for release. Indeed, they were mass-produced before the plan was scrapped and a majority of them were melted down. During this time, 1957 coins would continue to be restruck off old dies until the new coin series was officially released in 1961. This series is considered the most valuable of Soviet issues due to their scarcity.

On 1 January 1961, the currency was revalued again at a rate of 10:1, but this time a new coinage was introduced in denominations of 1, 2, 3 and 5 kopecks in aluminium-bronze, and 10, 15, 20 and 50 kopecks and 1 ruble in cupro-nickel-zinc. Like previous issues, the front featured the state arms and title while the back depicted date and denomination. The 50-kopeck and 1-ruble coins dated 1961 had plain edges, but starting in 1964, the edges were lettered with the denomination and date. All 1926–1957 coins were then withdrawn from circulation and demonetized, with the majority melted down.

Commemorative coins of the Soviet Union: in 1965, the first circulation commemorative ruble coin was released celebrating the 20th anniversary of the Soviet Union's victory over Nazi Germany, during this year the first uncirculated mint-coin sets were also released and restrictions on coin collecting were eased. In 1967, a commemorative series of 10-, 15-, 20- and 50-kopeck and 1-ruble coins was released, celebrating the 50th anniversary of the Russian Revolution and depicted Lenin and various socialist achievements. The smaller bronze denominations for that year remained unchanged. Many different circulation commemorative 1-ruble coins were also released, as well as a handful of 3- and 5-ruble coins over the years. Commemorative coins from this period were always slightly larger than general issues; 50-kopeck and 1-ruble coins in particular were larger, while the 1967 series of the small denominations were the same circumference but thicker than general issues.

Initially, commemorative rubles were struck in the same alloy as other circulating coins until 1975, when its composition was changed to higher-quality copper-nickel with zinc excluded. Its specifications (31 mm diameter, 12.8 grams) were nearly identical to those of the 5-Swiss franc coin (31.45 mm, 13.2 g, cupronickel) worth approx. €4.39 or US$5.09 as of August 2018, resulting in the large scale use of (now worthless) Soviet commemorative coins to defraud automated vending machines in Switzerland years after they have been demonetized.

Starting in 1991 with the final year of the 1961 coin series, both kopeck and ruble coins began depicting the mint marks (М) for Moscow, and (Л) for Leningrad.

1961 issue
| Image | Value | Diameter | Mass | Issued |
|---|---|---|---|---|
| | 1 kop | 15 | 1 | 1961–1991 |
| | 2 kop | 18 | 2 | 1961–1991 |
| | 3 kop | 22 | 3 | 1961–1962 1965–1991 |
| | 5 kop | 25 | 5 | 1961–1962 1965–1991 |
| | 10 kop | 17,27 | 1,8 | 1961–1962 1965–1991 |
| | 15 kop | 19,56 | 2,5 | 1961–1962 1965–1991 |
| | 20 kop | 21,8 | 3,4 | 1961–1962 1965–1991 |
| | 50 kop | 24 | 4,4 | 1961 1964–1991 |
| | Rbl 1 | 27 | 7,5 | 1961 1964–1991 |

These coins formally remained legal tender until the 1998 Monetary reform (withdrawn only on 31 December, 2002) and are considered the longest-circulating coins in Russia.

==== Banknotes ====
Banknotes were issued by the USSR State Treasury (Государственный казначейский билет, Gosudarstvenny kaznacheyskiy bilet) in denominations of 1, 3 and 5 rubles, and by the USSR State Bank (билет Государственного банка, bilet Gosudarstvennogo banka) in denominations of 10, 25, 50 and 100 rubles. Colors are similar to the previous series but notes were much smaller in size.

1961 Series
| Image | | Value | Watermark | Withdrawn |
| Obverse | Reverse | | Watermark | Withdrawn |
|---|---|---|---|---|
| | | Rbl 1 | dark and light 5-pointed stars | December 31, 1993 |
| | | Rbls 3 | dark and light 5-pointed stars | December 31, 1993 |
| | | Rbls 5 | dark and light 5-pointed stars | December 31, 1993 |
| | | Rbls 10 | dark and light 5-pointed stars | December 31, 1993 |
| | | Rbls 25 | dark and light 5-pointed stars | July 26, 1993 |
| | | Rbls 50 | Face of Lenin | January 23, 1991 |
| | | Rbls 100 | Face of Lenin | January 23, 1991 |

=== 1989 Unreleased Soviet rubles ===
After the failed project of making the 50th anniversary banknotes for 1967, the projects for the 30 ruble in 1988 were worked out in Goznak. The first ruble that was projected as an example of the 1967 project, breaking with old Soviet tradition. They decided to put other faces which in the first note was Tsiolkovsky's statue. For unknown reasons it was cancelled and archived in the "failed projects" archive with barely any prints after a debate around the prototype of the note. At the same time they tried to adopt a more traditional 30 Soviet ruble banknote which replaced the whole face-project with the Kremlin Tower. Although the project was already started in 1988 and was finalized in 1989, it had some potential and intention to be adopted but the Gosbank decided to not put in practice and was cancelled. Even in 1988, a lot of projects were started with the Tsiolkovsky monument banknotes but were never recovered and was certainly rejected as a proposal and only the 30 note remained while other variations got lost.

=== "Central Bank of Russia" project (1990) ===
The whole concept was to adopt a new Soviet ruble under the "Central Bank of Russia" which is still questioned. Although, there aren't only one type of banknotes and some of these prototype notes were discovered in different places, although its authenticity is still questioned as of one of the most outstanding banknotes of this (20, representing M.N. Kutuzov) series also becoming one of the most controversial ones because it was found in a professional banknote collector's album, as it was randomly discovered. The whole project was canceled because the name "Central Bank of Russia" and the different faces caused a lot of outrage as it was promoted as "Russian" and not Soviet, and was not promoting Lenin's head and tried to build up a totally whole new concept around the new 1991 series.

=== 1991 Forgotten Soviet banknote project ===
In 1989, designers sat at a table to draw a new type of Soviet banknote which represented buildings rather than people. Only the 1- and 2-ruble notes were designed. The 2-ruble note was designed in 1989 and could have been released in 1991. It was a very unusual sketch that combines the working man and the Kremlin as the whole unity of the country, the banknotes were drawn by V.K. Nikitin. The 1-ruble note was designed back in 1989 by I.S. Krylov and was planned to be released in 1991. The artist was chief of the artists of Goznak, one of the creators of the Soviet ruble banknotes between 1947 and 1991. He also painted postage stamps in the same period.

=== Seventh Soviet ruble, 1991–1993 ===
The Monetary Reform of 1991 was carried out by Mikhail Gorbachev and was known also as the Pavlov Reform. It was the last of such in the Soviet Union and began on January 22, 1991. Its architect was Minister of Finance Valentin Pavlov, who also became the last prime minister of the Soviet Union. The details included a brief period to exchange old 1961-dated 50- and 100-ruble notes for new 1991 notes — for three days from 23 to 25 January (Wednesday to Friday) and with a specific limit of no more than Rbls 1,000 per person—the ability to exchange other notes considered in the special commissions to the end of March 1991.

==== Coins ====
In late 1991, a new coinage was issued as direct obligations of the USSR State Bank in denominations of 10 and 50 kopecks, and 1, 5 and 10 rubles. The 10-kopeck coin was struck in brass-plated steel, the 50-kopeck and 1- and 5-ruble coins, in cupro-nickel, and the 10-ruble coin bimetallic with an aluminium-bronze centre and a cupro-nickel-zinc ring. The series depicts an image of the Kremlin on the obverse rather than the Soviet state emblem. However, this coin series was extremely short-lived as the Soviet Union ceased to exist only months after its release. It did, however, continue to be used in several former Soviet republics including Russia and particularly Tajikistan for a short time after the union had ceased to exist out of necessity.

==== Banknotes ====
New 1991-dated banknotes were all issued as USSR State Bank notes (including the 1, 3, and 5-ruble denominations), with nearly identical colours and size for all denominations, but included more colour and heightened security features. The 25-ruble note was omitted from this series, but still remained legal tender; all 1961 notes apart from the demonetized 50- and 100-ruble denominations remained in circulation. An important modification of the design included the removal of the texts in languages of other Soviet republics (i.e. all texts were in Russian only) in the 1992 issues; all 1991 notes (in exception to the 2nd 1991 100-ruble banknote) contained all Soviet languages. In this series, 1-ruble notes were issued on 27 June 1991, 3-ruble notes on 3 November 1991, 5-ruble notes on 5 July 1991, 10-ruble notes on 10 July 1991, 50- and 100-ruble notes on 23 January 1991, 200-ruble notes on 29 October 1991, and 500-ruble notes on 24 December 1991. 1,000-ruble notes were issued in March 1992, after the Soviet collapse. New 1992-dated notes, similar in appearance to the 1991 issues, were printed in denominations of 50 to 1,000 rubles. bearing the Soviet state emblem and name. A notable exception was that the more-colourful Rbls 100. Notes of this series were still dated 1991 unlike the others.

After the breakup of the Soviet Union, many newly independent republics chose to continue circulating Soviet rubles even after the introduction of the new Russian ruble in 1993.

1991 Series
| Image | | Value | Watermark | Issued | Withdrawn |
| Obverse | Reverse | Value | Watermark | Issued | Withdrawn |
| | | Rbl 1 | 5-pointed stars and wavy stripes | 27 June 1991 | 31 December 1993 |
| | | Rbls 3 | 5-pointed stars and wavy stripes | 3 November 1991 | 31 December 1993 |
| | | Rbls 5 | 5-pointed stars and wavy stripes | 5 July 1991 | 31 December 1993 |
| | | Rbls 10 | dark and light 5-pointed stars | 10 July 1991 | 31 December 1993 |
| | | Rbls 50 | Face of Lenin | 23 January 1991 | 31 December 1993 |
| | | Rbls 100 | Face of Lenin | 23 January 1991 | 31 December 1993 |
| | | Rbls 200 | Face of Lenin | 30 November 1991 | 31 December 1993 |
| | | Rbls 500 | Face of Lenin | 24 December 1991 | 31 December 1993 |
| | | Rbls 1,000 | Face of Lenin | 19 March 1992 | 31 December 1993 |

Most of these notes were withdrawn on 26 July 1993, though due to the impossibility and the lack of exchanging these notes for most people it was extended up until the end of August and then again to 1 October 1993. These notes circulated up until the end of the 1993 Monetary reforms, 31 December 1993 due to the strict time limit and the strict exchange limit.

=== 1992 Soviet rubles ===
After the collapse of the Soviet Union, new banknotes were implemented using the old 1991 model even after the collapse. These are stamped with a denomination symbol and all languages of the former union were removed except Russian language. Even after the USSR ceased to exist, it was still titled as the money of the USSR. These were temporary issues as already in the same year, new notes were implemented. After the Monetary Reform of 1993, these notes were out of circulation though the withdrawal time limit was constantly extended due to people not having time to exchange them and the very strict exchange and time limit. Being first withdrawn on 26 July 1993, with the beginning of the reforms and then extended to the end of August 1993 and then to 1 October 1993 and then only exchanged if it's proven with documentation that it wasn't possible to exchange them during the time limit and finally withdrawn on 31 December 1993 with the end of the Monetary Reforms.

1992 Series
| Image | | Value | Watermark | Issued | Withdrawn |
| Obverse | Reverse | Value | Watermark | Issued | Withdrawn |
| | | Rbls 50 | 5-pointed stars and wavy stripes | July 1, 1992 | 31 December 1993 |
| | | Rbls 100 | dark and light 5-pointed stars | March 4, 1992 | 31 December 1993 |
| | | Rbls 200 | 5-pointed stars and wavy stripes | July 1, 1992 | 31 December 1993 |
| | | Rbls 500 | dark and light 5-pointed stars | July 1, 1992 | 31 December 1993 |
| | | Rbls 1000 | dark and light 5-pointed stars | July 1, 1992 | 31 December 1993 |

Banknotes used up until 1993 were de-jure declared withdrawn with the 1993 Monetary reform started by Viktor Geraschenko although most of these notes de-facto circulated up until the end of the reform, 31 December 1993. The reason to quickly withdraw these notes was that lot of the banks and printers in these newly independent countries had the opportunity to print infinite amount of rubles which caused concerns around the stability of the currency and following the privatization, the Soviet ruble quickly devalued. The withdrawal of the notes were extended from 26 July up to the end of August. The withdrawal time limit of the banknotes was again extended up to 1 October, and from 1 October banknotes were only exchanged if the person proved with documentation that they were not able to exchange the banknotes in which most of the people had no time to exchange them. Due to the extremely strict time limit and the strict exchange limit (first 35,000 rubles, approximately US$35/per person and from 26 July 1993 100,000 rubles, approximately US$100 were exchanged/per person), a lot of people lost their savings and money from their bank and it led to debates with neighbouring countries due to the fact that their currencies were tied to the Soviet ruble or they used Soviet rubles. From 1 December 1993, a new special procedure for their use in circulation was introduced, which banned all organizations, enterprises and institutions issuing these banknotes from their cash desks for any purpose, including change. All of these banknotes were issued by the Central Bank of Russia in 1992 with 5,000 and 10,000 Ruble notes issued in the same year circulating parallel with the rest of the Soviet ruble notes. Even though the Central Bank of Russia published the old 1991 Soviet ruble notes with a 1992 stamp under the name of the State Bank of the USSR, though the bank already ceased to exist in March 1992 just before the banknotes were published. The 100 ruble note is still dated 1991, though was issued and printed in 1992. The watermark portrait of Lenin was replaced with stars, formerly used by smaller denomination banknotes of 1, 3, 5, 10 and 25 Rubles.

== Economic role ==
The Soviet Union ran a planned economy, where the government controlled prices and the exchange of currency. Thus the Soviet ruble did not function like a currency in a market economy, because mechanisms other than currency, such as centrally planned quotas, controlled the distribution of goods. Consequently, the ruble did not have the utility of a true currency; instead, it more resembled the scrip issued in a truck system. Soviet citizens could freely purchase a set of goods from state shops with rubles, but choice was limited and prices were always political decisions, having no direct connection to manufacturing cost. Bread and public transport were heavily subsidised, but wages were low and there were shortages of manufactured consumer goods, implementing hidden taxes. It was common to hold large savings in rubles in the State Labor Savings Banks System of the USSR because credit was not available. Special rubles used in accounting were not exchangeable to cash, and were effectively different currency units pegged to the ruble. The currency was not freely exchangeable and its export was illegal. In bilateral trade, a separate, non-convertible "clearing ruble" credit was used. There were separate shops (Beriozka) for purchasing goods obtained with hard currencies. However, Soviet citizens could not legally own foreign currency. Thus, if they legally received payment in foreign currency, they were forced to convert it to Vneshposyltorg cheques at a rate set by the government. These cheques could be spent at a Beriozka. The sudden transformation from a Soviet "non-currency" into a market currency contributed to the economic hardship following the dissolution of the Soviet Union in December 1991.

== Exchange rates ==
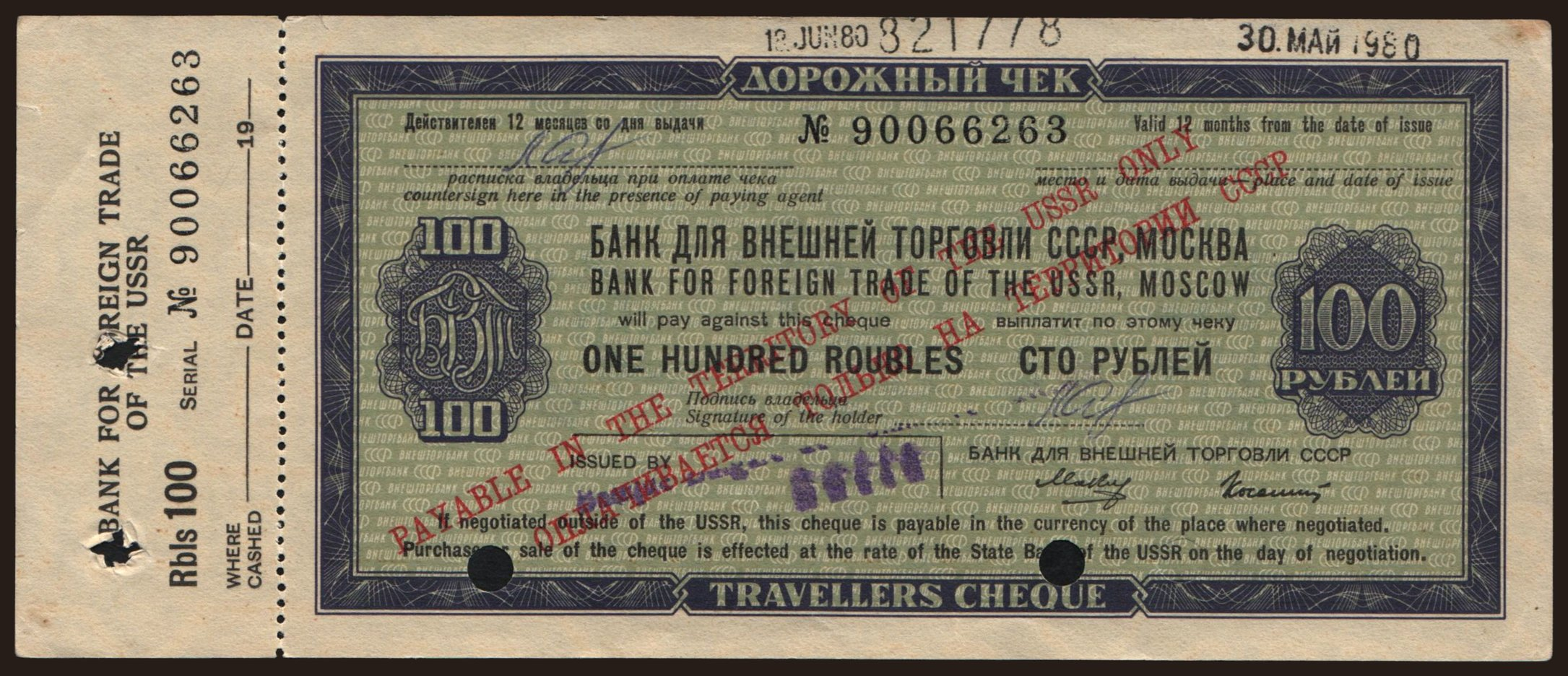
A Soviet traveller's cheque cashed on 30 May 1980

The Soviet Union officially valued the ruble in the planned economy at an average of US$1.35 (or Rbl 0.74 per US dollar; see below) from 1971 to 1988. However, as the ruble was not internationally exchangeable and as Soviet citizens could not legally own foreign currency, rubles changed hands in the black market at an average of Rbls 4.14 per dollar in the same period 1971–88. The opening up of the economy in the late 1980s under perestroika resulted in the recognition of more realistic exchange rates for the ruble, as follows:

- In November 1989 the ruble was devalued for foreign travel to a tourist rate of Rbls 6.26 per dollar (versus Rbl 0.6277 officially).
- In November 1990 a new commercial exchange rate of Rbls 1.80 per dollar was introduced. During this time, however, black market dollars changed hands at 20 Rbls.
- In April 1991, following the failed monetary reform of 1991, the tourist exchange rate was raised significantly to Rbls 27.60 per dollar, making the average monthly Soviet salary of Rbls 330 worth only $12 on the international market.
- Further pain would continue later that year with the dollar changing hands at Rbls 35-40 on the black market and Rbls 45-70 in government auctions as of October 1991.
- By early December 1991, just before the Soviet Union ceased to exist, the ruble had depreciated to nearly Rbls 100 to the dollar.

Official exchange rates Soviet ruble of the time per United States dollar:

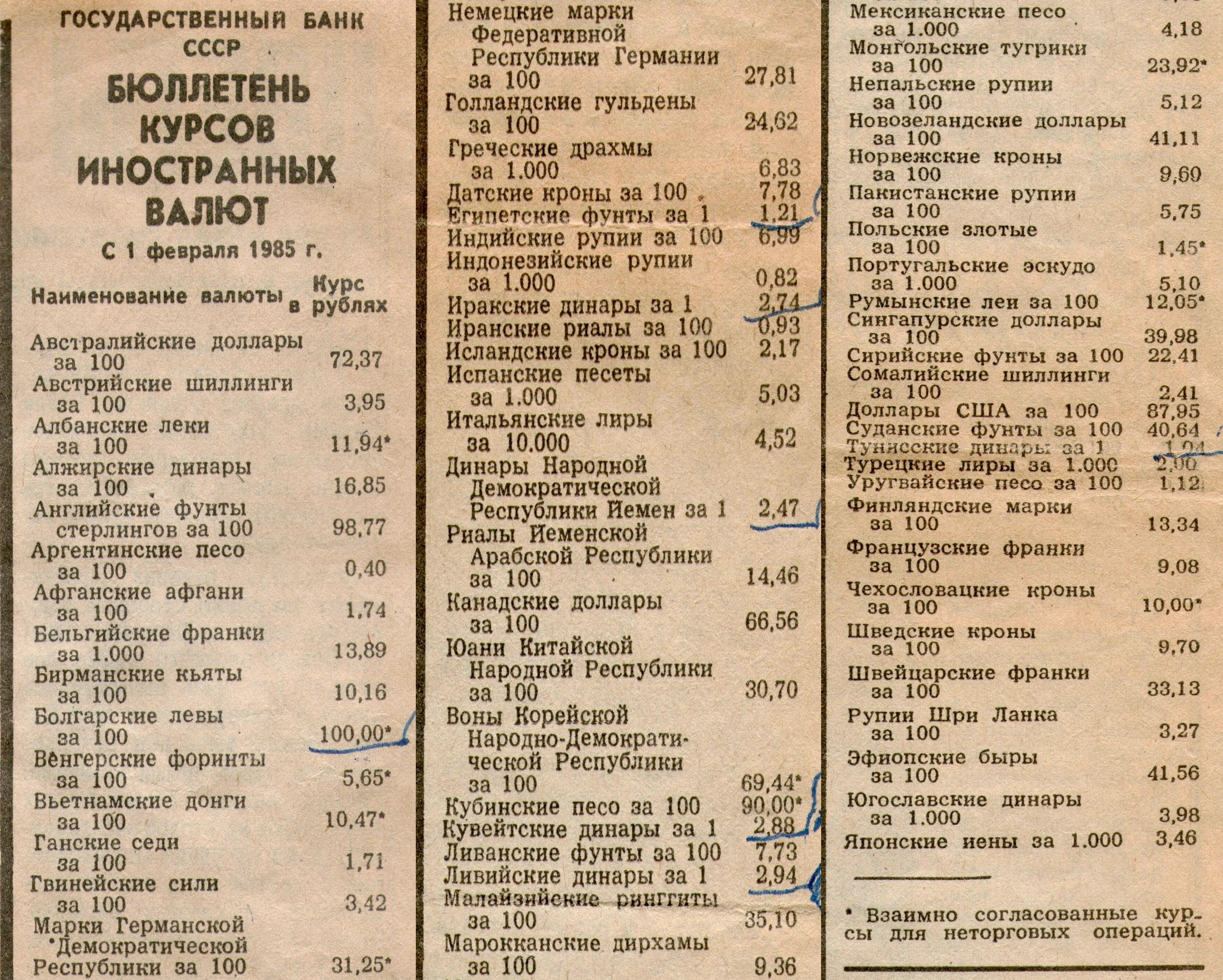
Official Soviet exchange rates against major world currencies, 1 February 1985

| Date | Rbls of the time per US$ | US$ per Rbl of the time |
|---|---|---|
| 1924-01-01 | Rbls 2.2000 | $0.4545 |
| 1924-04-01 | Rbls 1.9405 | $0.5153 |
| 1927-01-01 | Rbls 1.9450 | $0.5141 |
| 1928-02-01 | Rbls 1.9434 | $0.5145 |
| 1933-04-01 | Rbls 1.9434 | $0.5145 |
| 1933-05-01 | Rbls 1.7474 | $0.5722 |
| 1934-01-01 | Rbls 1.2434 | $0.8042 |
| 1935-01-01 | Rbls 1.1509 | $0.8689 |
| 1936-01-01 | Rbls 1.1516 | $0.8684 |
| 1937-01-01 | Rbls 5.0400 | $0.1984 |
| 1937-07-19 | Rbls 5.3000 | $0.1887 |
| 1950-02-01 | Rbls 5.3000 | $0.1887 |
| 1950-03-01 | Rbls 4.0000 | $0.2500 |
| 1960-12-01 | Rbls 4.0000 | $0.2500 |
| 1961-01-01 | Rbl 0.9000 | $1.1111 |
| 1971-12-01 | Rbl 0.9000 | $1.1111 |
| 1972-01-01 | Rbl 0.8290 | $1.2063 |
| 1973-01-01 | Rbl 0.8260 | $1.2107 |
| 1974-01-01 | Rbl 0.7536 | $1.3270 |
| 1975-01-01 | Rbl 0.7300 | $1.3699 |
| 1976-01-01 | Rbl 0.7580 | $1.3193 |
| 1977-01-01 | Rbl 0.7420 | $1.3477 |
| 1978-01-01 | Rbl 0.7060 | $1.4164 |
| 1979-01-01 | Rbl 0.6590 | $1.5175 |
| 1980-01-03 | Rbl 0.6395 | $1.5637 |
| 1981-01-01 | Rbl 0.6750 | $1.4815 |
| 1982-01-01 | Rbl 0.7080 | $1.4124 |
| 1983-01-13 | Rbl 0.7070 | $1.4144 |
| 1984-01-01 | Rbl 0.7910 | $1.2642 |
| 1985-02-28 | Rbl 0.9200 | $1.0870 |
| 1986-01-01 | Rbl 0.7585 | $1.3184 |
| 1987-01-01 | Rbl 0.6700 | $1.4925 |
| 1988-01-06 | Rbl 0.5804 | $1.7229 |
| 1989-01-04 | Rbl 0.6059 | $1.6504 |
| 1990-01-03 | Rbl 0.6072 | $1.6469 |
| 1991-01-02 | Rbl 0.5605 | $1.7841 |
| 1991-02-13 | Rbl 0.5450 | $1.8349 |
| 1992-01-01 | Rbl 0.5549 | $1.8021 |

== Replacement currencies in the former Soviet republics ==
Shortly after the fall of the Soviet Union in 1991, local currencies were introduced in the newly independent states. Most of the new economies were weak and hence most of the currencies have undergone significant reforms since their first introduction. In the very beginning of the post-Soviet economic transition, it was widely believed by ordinary people and monetary institutions (including the International Monetary Fund) that it was possible to maintain a common currency working for all or at least for some of the former Soviet Union's countries. The wish to preserve the strong trade relations between former Soviet republics was considered the most important goal.

During the first half of 1992, a monetary union with 15 independent states all using the Russian ruble existed. Since it was clear that the situation would not last, each of them used their positions as "free-riders" to issue huge amounts of money in the form of credit (since Russia held the monopoly on printing banknotes and coins). As a result, some countries were issuing coupons in order to "protect" their markets from buyers from other states. This also started to cause massive inflation in the formerly high-valued currency.

The Central Bank of Russia responded in July 1992 by setting up restrictions on the flow of credit between Russia and other states. The final collapse of the "ruble zone" began with the exchange of banknotes by the Central Bank of Russia on Russian territory at the end of 1993. As a result, other countries still in the ruble zone (Kazakhstan, Uzbekistan, Turkmenistan, Moldova, Armenia and Georgia) were "pushed out". By the end of 1993 all newly independent states had introduced their own currencies, with the exception of war-torn Tajikistan (Tajik ruble in 1995) and unrecognized Transnistria (Transnistrian ruble in 1994). Due to ruinous inflation in the former Soviet Republics, most of the successor currencies had to be redenominated at least once.

Details on the introduction of new currencies in the newly independent states are discussed below.

| Post-Soviet country | Replacement currency, with date, new code, and rate replacing the "Soviet ruble" (SUR) | Further revaluation or currency replacement date, new replaced currency and rate | |
|---|---|---|---|
| Russia | 1992: Russian ruble (RUR); 1 SUR = 1 RUR 1992–1993 ruble zone | 1 January 1998: Russian ruble (RUB); 1,000 RUR = 1 RUB | |
| Armenia | 1992: Russian ruble (RUR); 1 SUR = 1 RUR 1992–1993 ruble zone | 1994: Armenian dram (AMD); 200 RUR = 1 AMD | |
| Azerbaijan | 1992: Russian ruble (RUR); 1 SUR = 1 RUR 1992–1993 ruble zone | 1994: Azerbaijani manat (AZM); 10 RUR = 1 AZM | 1 January 2006: Azerbaijani manat (AZN); 5,000 AZM = 1 AZN |
| Belarus | 1992: Russian ruble (RUR); 1 SUR = 1 RUR 1992–1993 ruble zone | 1 June 1994: Belarusian ruble (BYB); 10 RUR = 1 BYB | 1 January 2000: Belarusian ruble (BYR); 1,000 BYB = 1 BYR |
| Belarus | 1992: Russian ruble (RUR); 1 SUR = 1 RUR 1992–1993 ruble zone | 1 June 1994: Belarusian ruble (BYB); 10 RUR = 1 BYB | 1 July 2016: Belarusian ruble (BYN); 10,000 BYR = 1 BYN |
| Georgia | 1992: Russian ruble (RUR); 1 SUR = 1 RUR 1992–1993 ruble zone | 1994: Georgian kuponi (GEK); 1 RUR = 1 GEK | 25 September 1995: Georgian lari (GEL); 1,000,000 GEK = 1 GEL |
| Kazakhstan | 1992: Russian ruble (RUR); 1 SUR = 1 RUR 1992–1993 ruble zone | 1994: Kazakh tenge (KZT); 500 RUR = 1 KZT | |
| Kyrgyzstan | 1992: Russian ruble (RUR); 1 SUR = 1 RUR 1992–1993 ruble zone | 27 July 1993: Kyrgyz som (KGS); 200 RUR = 1 KGS | |
| Moldova | 1992: Russian ruble (RUR); 1 SUR = 1 RUR 1992–1993 ruble zone | 29 November 1993: Moldovan leu (MDL); 1,000 RUR = 1 MDL | |
| Tajikistan | 1992: Russian ruble (RUR); 1 SUR = 1 RUR 1992–1993 ruble zone | 10 May 1995: Tajik ruble (TJR); 100 RUR = 1 TJR | 30 October 2000: Tajikistani somoni (TJS); 1,000 TJR = 1 TJS |
| Turkmenistan | 1992: Russian ruble (RUR); 1 SUR = 1 RUR 1992–1993 ruble zone | 1 November 1993: Turkmenistani manat (TMM); 500 RUR = 1 TMM | 1 January 2009: Turkmenistani manat (TMT); 5,000 TMM = 1 TMT |
| Uzbekistan | 1992: Russian ruble (RUR); 1 SUR = 1 RUR 1992–1993 ruble zone | 1 July 1994: Uzbekistani sum (UZS); 1,000 RUR = 1 UZS | |
| Estonia | 1992: Estonian kroon (EEK); 10 SUR = 1 EEK | 1 January 2011: Euro (EUR); 15.6466 EEK = 1 EUR | |
| Latvia | 1992: Latvian ruble (LVR); 1 SUR = 1 LVR | 28 June 1993: Latvian lats (LVL); 200 LVR = 1 LVL | 1 January 2014: Euro (EUR); 0.702804 LVL = 1 EUR |
| Lithuania | 1992: Lithuanian talonas (LTT); 10 SUR = 1 LTT | 25 June 1993: Lithuanian litas (LTL); 100 LTT = 1 LTL | 1 January 2015: Euro (EUR); 3.4528 LTL = 1 EUR |
| Ukraine | 1992: Ukrainian karbovanets (UAK); 1 SUR = 1 UAK | 3 September 1996: Ukrainian hryvnia (UAH); 100,000 UAK = 1 UAH | |

== See also ==
- Hyperinflation in early Soviet Russia
- List of commemorative coins of the Soviet Union
