= Tuzex =

Chain of stores in socialist Czechoslovakia

Logo of Tuzex

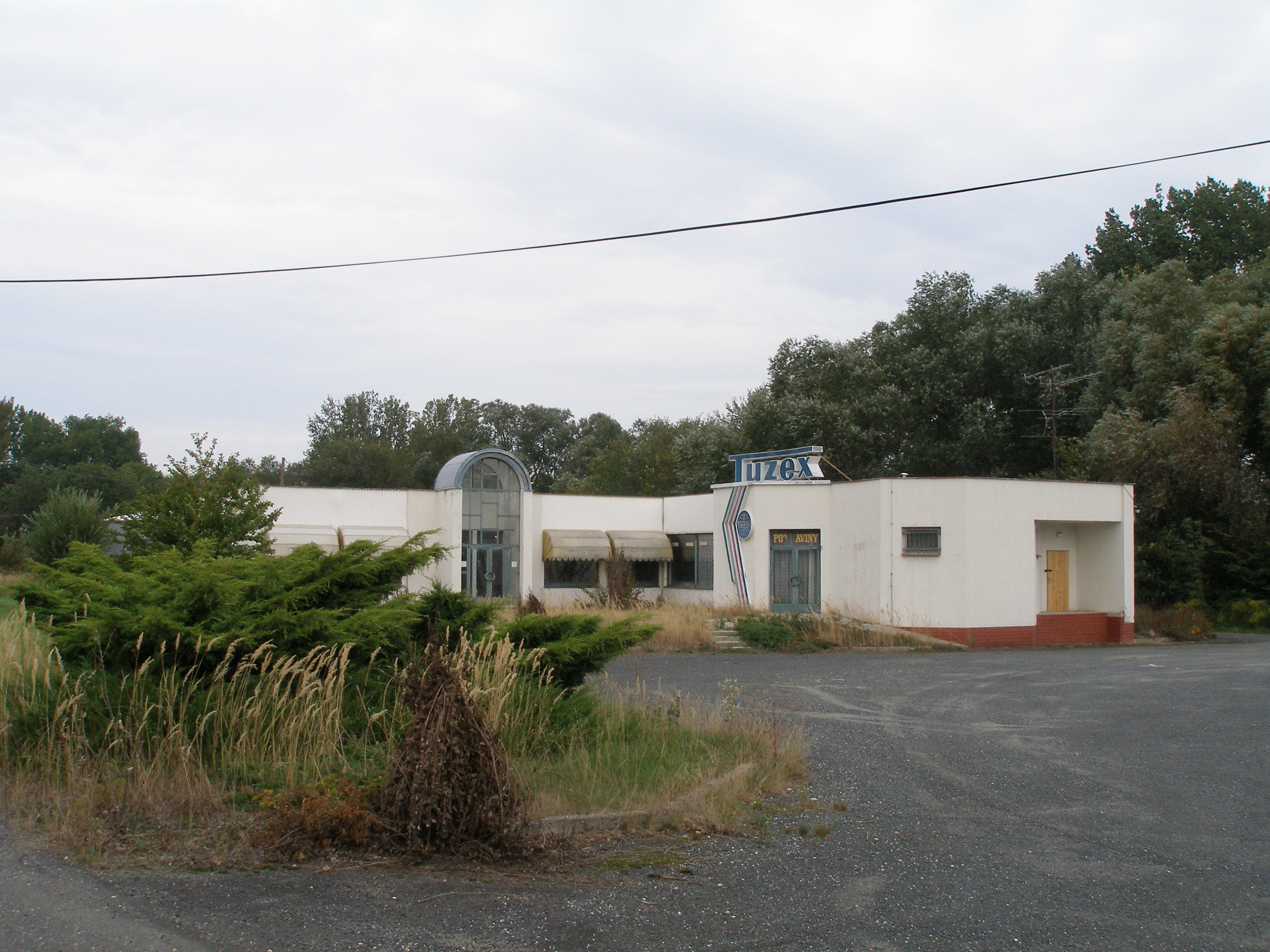
former Tuzex shop

Tuzex was a series of state-run shops in Czechoslovakia from 1957 to 1992 which did not accept normal Czechoslovak koruna currency but only vouchers (bony) which could be purchased from banks using foreign currency. They supplied luxury items: local goods in short supply and in particular foreign goods. The Tuzex vouchers were effectively an unofficial parallel currency.

== History ==
The Czechoslovak koruna (crown) was a soft currency, that is, not exchangeable for other currencies outside the country. In 1948, shops were established under the name Darex to sell goods to foreigners for foreign (hard) currency only (based on the earlier Torgsin shops in the Soviet Union). Later, these became open to ordinary citizens, but not for crowns. In 1950, to speed up transactions and limit fraud, foreign currency was first converted into Darex vouchers in values of crowns.

Bank calculation for exchanging rubles for Tuzex vouchers, 1986.

In 1957, the PZO (Foreign Trade Enterprise) Tuzex (a contraction of tuzemský export [domestic export]) was founded in order to get convertible foreign currency into the country. This currency came directly from foreigners visiting the country, but also from relatives or citizens working abroad, who could send currency to friends and family to buy items in Tuzex, with Tuzex vouchers instead of Darex ones. The vouchers could not be re-exchanged for foreign currency and were valid for a limited time. (The state would convert unused vouchers back to normal currency at a rate of 2 crowns per Tuzex crown, a fraction of their effective purchasing power.)

The first shop was established in Prague on Rytířská street, and the next in Bratislava. In 1961 there were 14 shops, rising to 170 in 1988.

However, the fact that otherwise unavailable luxuries could be purchased led to an unofficial or grey market (technically illegal but tolerated) buying Tuzex vouchers with Czechoslovak currency at a high premium, typically 5 to 1. The Darex and Tuzex vouchers were colloquially known as bony. The hustlers or spivs who would offer sell them on the street (close to a Tuzex shop) were known as veksláci (from German Wechsel - exchange) A 1987 film with title: Bony a klid (vouchers and tranquility as a (phonetical) reference to Bonnie and Clyde) reflects the daily lives of petty criminals dealing with the vouchers.

Following the Velvet Revolution in 1989 and the reformation of the country, citizens were able to travel abroad more freely and to legally deal with other currencies. In addition, improved domestic economy and more imports meant that Tuzex sales declined. The sale of Tuzex vouchers ceased on 30 June 1992.

As well as running the shops, the Tuzex corporation had activities in various countries in order to trade Czechoslovak goods and obtain supplies for the shops. This continued for a while after the closure of the shops in 1992 to complete contracts and for liquidation of the assets.

== Tuzex vouchers ==
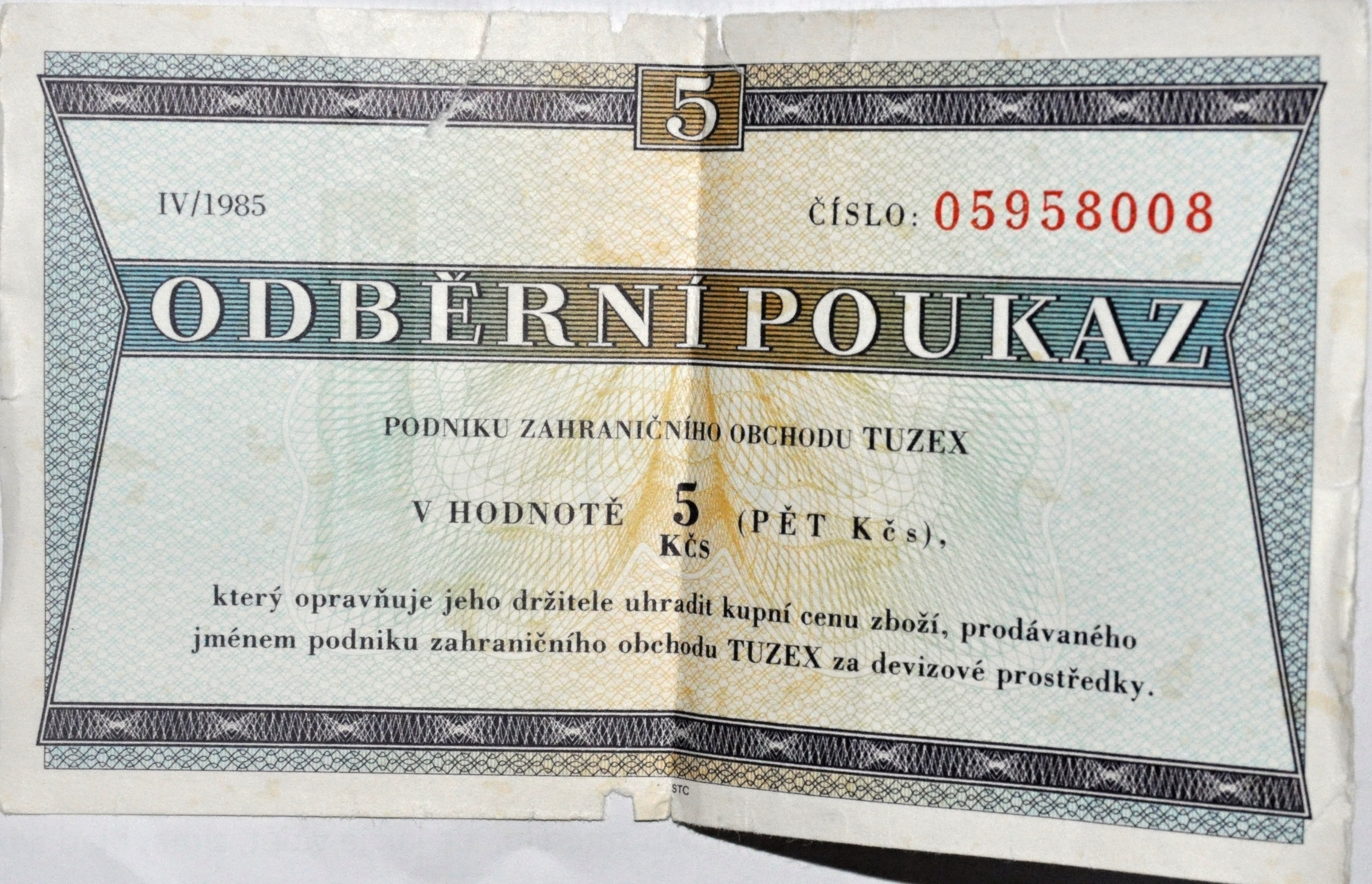
Tuzex voucher for 5 crowns

Tuzex vouchers were originally issued in values of 0.50, 1, 5, 10, 20, 50, 100 crowns and later 500 crowns. However, from 1958 there was a voucher of 71.50 crowns, being issued in exchange for US$10. Tuzex also issued vouchers to foreigners to buy motor fuel. In 1988 the first payment card in Czechoslovakia was introduced to allow cashless purchases at Tuzex stores.

== Goods ==
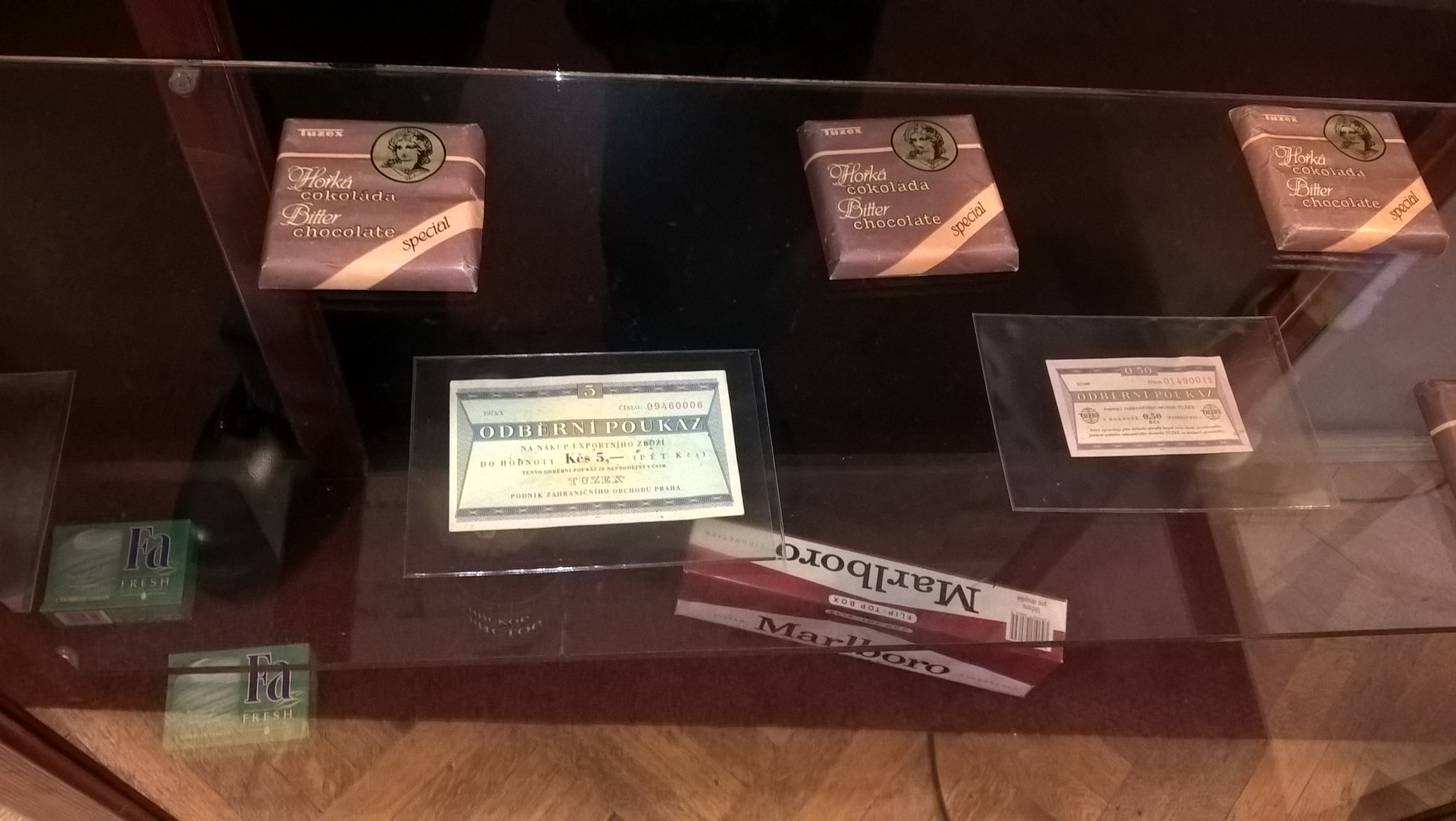
Display of a Tuzex counter in the Museum of Communism, Czech Republic

Initially, Tuzex stocked export-quality Czechoslovak products (e.g. fine chocolate, alcohol) at what would be a good price for foreigners, and Western products such as cigarettes. Better quality/style clothing became important, with Tuzex clothes becoming an indicator of success for some people. The clothes selection eventually included jeans (the first being the Italian brand Rifle in 1968) as the epitome of western or "Texas" clothing, white goods, and motor cars. The advantage in many cases was that such goods were available immediately instead of a long wait of possibly years.

In 1988, Tuzex had 170 shops which sold $250 million worth of goods, two-thirds western imports, and one-third export-quality items from Czechoslovakia.

== See also ==
- Eastern Bloc economies
- Foreign exchange certificate
- Torgsin, the precursor from 1931-1936 USSR
- Beryozka (Russian retail store), a Soviet Union counterpart
- Intershop, an East German counterpart
- Pewex, a Polish counterpart
- Corecom, a Bulgarian counterpart
