= Friendship store =

Chinese store chain

- Simplified Chinese: 友谊商店
- Traditional Chinese: 友誼商店
Transcriptions
Standard Mandarin
- Hanyu Pinyin: Yǒuyì Shāngdiàn
- Wade–Giles: Yu-i Shang-tian

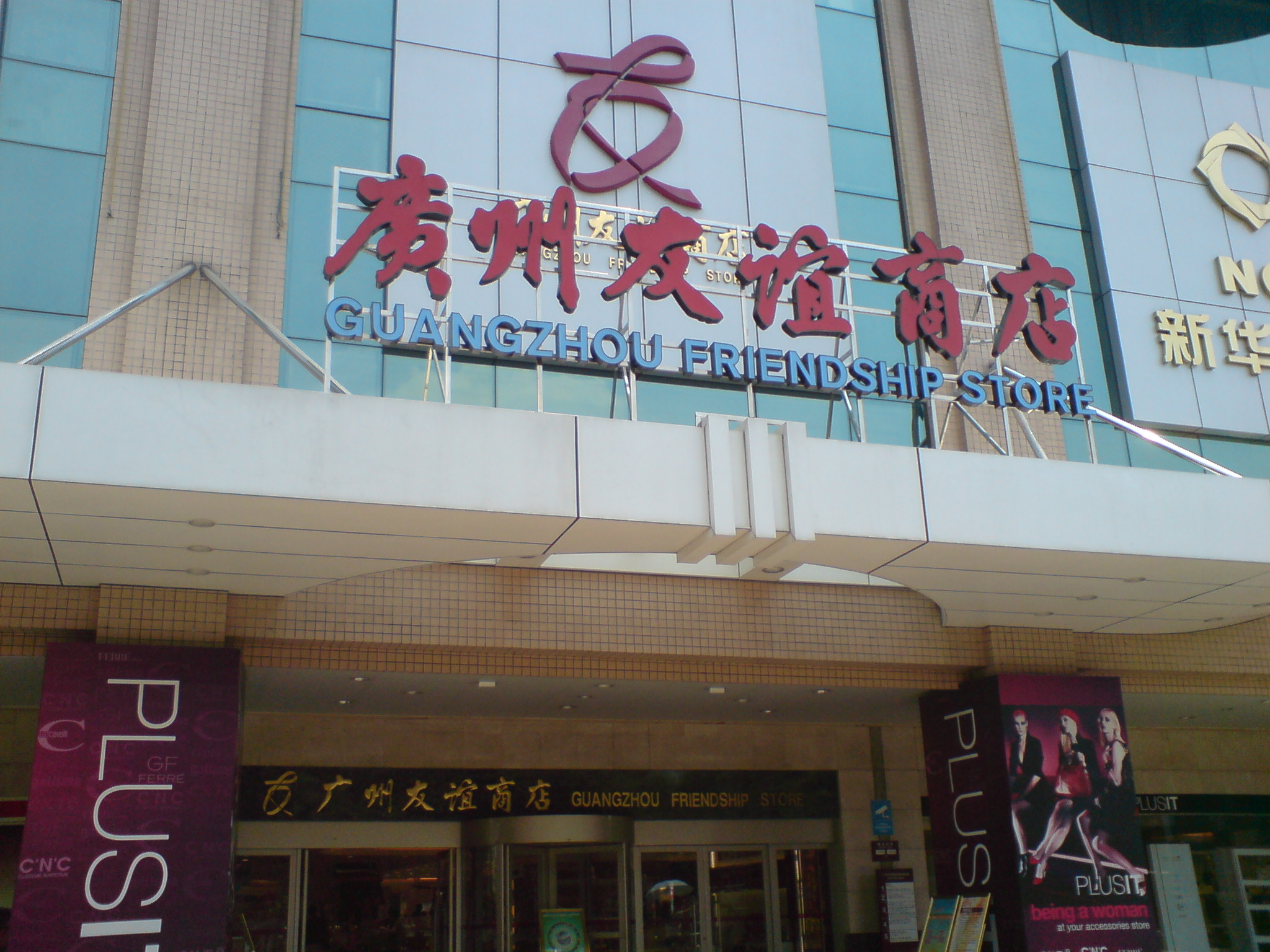
Guangzhou Friendship Store

A friendship store (Chinese: 友谊商店) is a state-run store in the People's Republic of China (PRC), which initially sold exclusively to foreign visitors and tourists, diplomats, and government officials, but now has no restrictions on customers.

== History ==
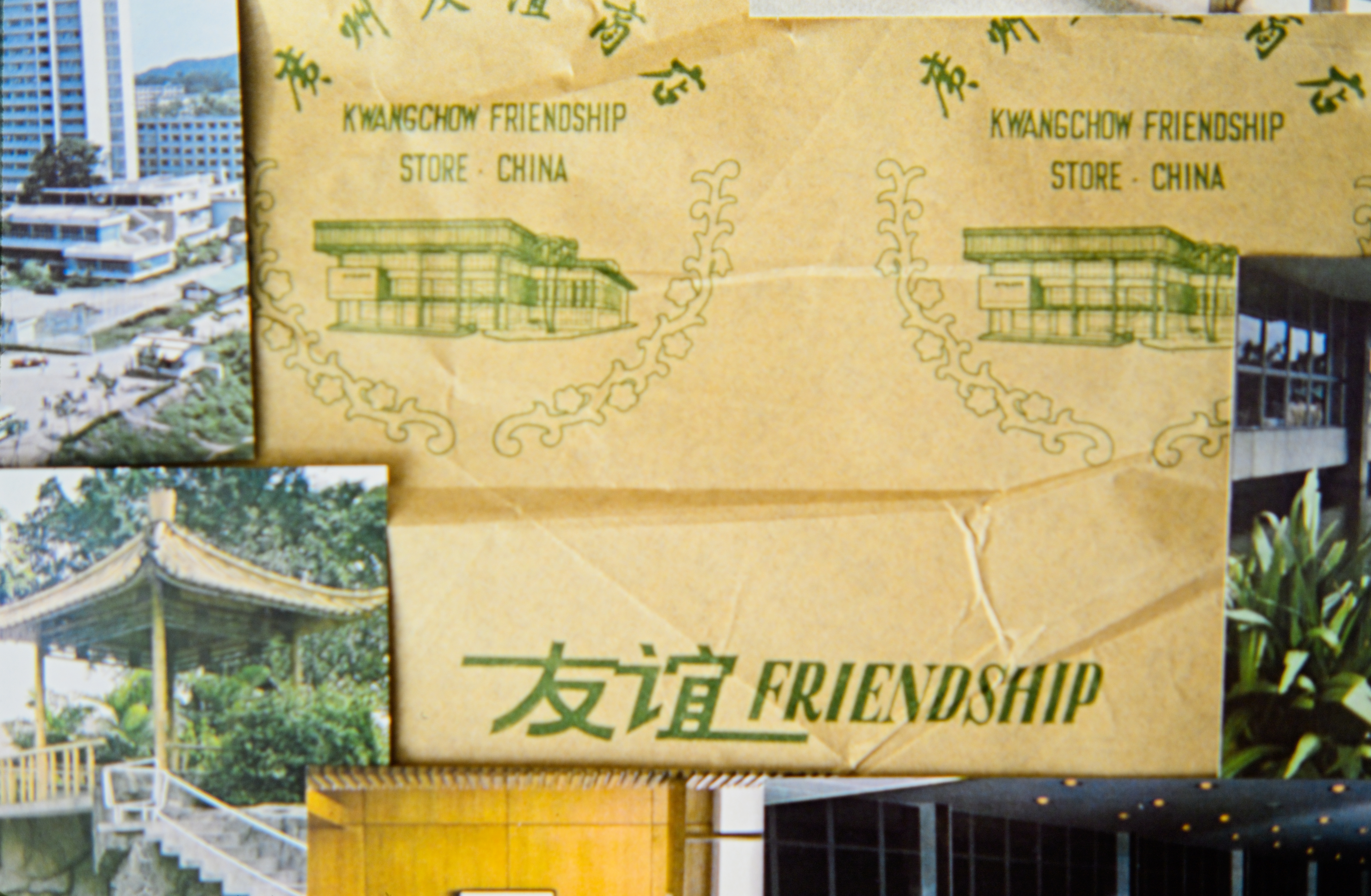
Guangzhou Friendship Store in 1982

The stores were state-owned and first appeared in the 1950s, when they were primarily frequented by the many Soviet experts assisting China's economic development. Friendship Stores allowed the government to collect foreign currency from tourists, diplomats, and foreign workers while limiting their access to the domestic economy. The stores sold Western, imported items, such as peanut butter and Hershey bars, as well as high-quality Chinese art and crafts.

The old friendship stores accepted only foreign exchange certificates as currency. Prices were considerably higher than those in the country of origin. Because the stores operated as a monopoly for imported items, buyers had no other choice. Generally, foreigners were only allowed access to these foreign exchange certificates and, as such, provided a method of control over foreign currency to the People's Republic of China (PRC).

Items for sale included uncensored copies of Western literature such as The New York Times. Other goods included items such as Johnnie Walker Red Label whisky or Marlboro cigarettes, which were familiar Western products that catered to foreign visitors. Customers had to present a foreign passport to the guards to be permitted entry. Often, crowds of people would look through the windows to see what was for sale.

The restrictions imposed by Friendship Stores and the use of foreign exchange certificates contributed to increased black market activity during the 1980s. These black markets allowed foreigners to have access to renminbi that they could use in regular Chinese restaurants and shops. Chinese citizens, who were typically not permitted to shop in Friendship Stores, were able to obtain foreign exchange certificates through informal currency exchanges. The certificates were often sold at a premium on the black market and allowed Chinese citizens to purchase imported goods and higher-quality products.

The abolition of foreign exchange certificates in the early 1990s made friendship stores largely redundant, with foreign visitors being allowed to hold ordinary renminbi in the PRC. Most stores have now closed, but a few remain, most notably in Beijing, Shanghai, and Guangzhou.

== Modern friendship stores ==
In transitioning away from foreign exchange certificates, some contemporary friendship stores have been forced to reckon with falling demand as well as competition from e-commerce sites. For example, Beijing's friendship store announced a 2016 to 2019 redevelopment plan which would see the site replaced with a more modern Friendship Plaza. Beijing's "Friendship Plaza" now features shopping centers with popular western chains like Starbucks, Baskin-Robbins, Délifrance, Pizza Hut, as well as a bookshop which stocks a wide range of English-language magazines and newspapers. The Friendship Plaza also includes new offices, businesses, and urbanized spaces.

There are also two friendship stores in Shanghai, one in the city center and one in Hongqiao.

The friendship store in Guangzhou has developed into a listed company. Apart from the original store opposite the Garden Hotel, it now has five branch stores in Guangzhou, Foshan and Nanning.

== See also ==
- Politics of the People's Republic of China
- Beryozka (Russian retail store)
- Dollar store (Cuba)
- Intershop
