= Corecom =

Former Bulgarian company

Corecom logo

Corecom (Bulgarian: Кореком) was a chain of hard-currency stores during the communist rule in Bulgaria. Goods were often priced cheaper than in the West; however, they were still inaccessible for most Bulgarians because the national currency, the lev, was not accepted at the stores. Apart from Western diplomats and visitors, access to hard currency was a privilege of the nomenklatura (small, elite subset of the general population) and a few other people who were authorised to travel abroad or do business with Westerners. Anyone purchasing goods at Corecom but not authorised to possess foreign currency ran the risk of investigation by the authorities.

The stores operated on the same principle as East German Intershops, Czechoslovak Tuzex, or Polish Pewex stores. In addition to major Western currencies, such as US dollars, Corecom stores also accepted foreign exchange certificates. Western consumer goods sold at these stores were not available at regular retail outlets, including imported spirits and tobacco products (e.g. Scotch whisky and Marlboro cigarettes), consumer electronics (e.g. VCRs and video cameras), cosmetics, clothing, magazines, toys, and even foodstuffs such as Kinder Surprise chocolate eggs (commonly known as "корекомски яйца" or "Corecom eggs" at the time). There were also Bulgarian products that were either destined exclusively for export or ordinarily required signing up on long waiting lists.

Ironically, by making the significantly greater diversity and quality of Western consumer goods conspicuous yet inaccessible to the vast majority of the population, the communist party elites inadvertently demonstrated the hypocrisy of their anti-Western rhetoric.

== See also ==
- Shortage economy
- Eastern Bloc economies
