= Foreign Parcel Trading Company =

The All-Union Association Vneshposyltorg (All-Union Foreign Mail Order Trade Association) was an organization in the Soviet Union which handled trade in imported goods for hard currency.

It was mostly known for its Beryozka chain of shops.

Vneshposyltorg sold consumer goods to foreigners with optional delivery within Soviet territory. This gave foreigners the opportunity to send gifts to their friends and relatives in the Soviet Union.

In 1984, forwarding of parcels from foreign firms to Soviet addresses was cancelled.

With the dissolution of the Soviet Union and the introduction of the conversion of rubles into hard currency, the organization lost its importance and was privatized.

In 1992 it was merged with Vostokintorg to create Vneshintorg.

== See also ==
- Foreign Trade Bank of the USSR (Vneshtorgbank)
- Vneshtekhnika
- Vneshtorgreklama
