= Hard currency =

Reliable and stable globally-traded currency

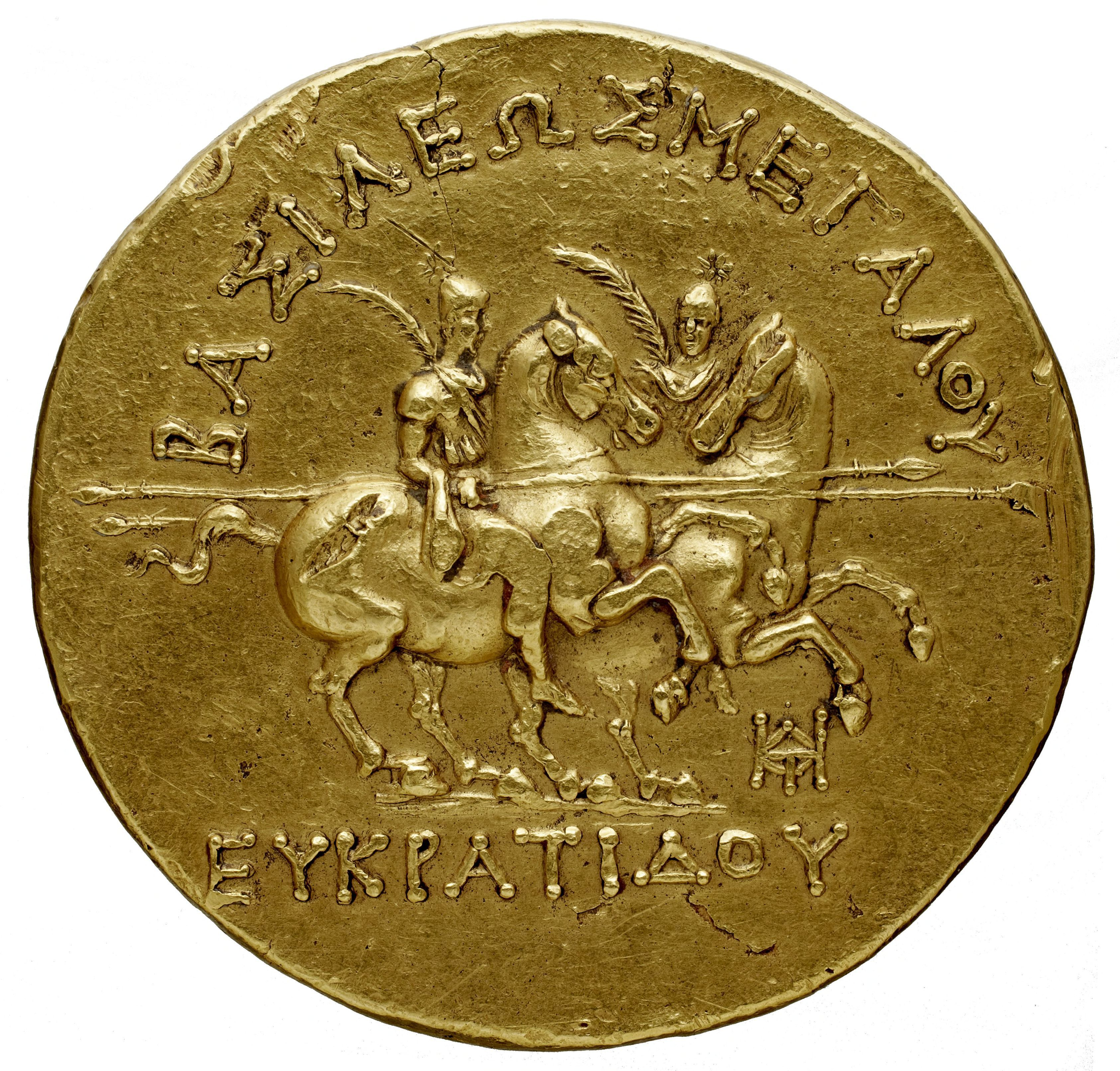
A gold coin is a form of hard currency whose value derives from its precious metal content, in contrast to fiat money, whose value rests on government decree and monetary policy, which makes it subject to inflation and debasement.

In macroeconomics, hard currency, sound money, safe-haven currency, or strong currency is any globally traded currency that serves as a reliable and stable store of value. Factors contributing to a currency's hard status might include its historical use as a money (such as gold or silver), or if it is a fiat currency, the stability and reliability of the respective state's legal and bureaucratic institutions, level of corruption, long-term stability of its purchasing power, the associated country's political and fiscal condition and outlook, and the policy posture of the issuing central bank.

Safe haven currency is defined as a currency which behaves like a hedge for a reference portfolio of risky assets conditional on movements in global risk aversion. Conversely, a weak or soft currency is one which is expected to fluctuate erratically or depreciate against other currencies. Softness is typically the result of weak legal institutions and/or political or fiscal instability. Junk currency is even less trusted than soft currency, and has a very low currency value. Soft and junk currencies often suffer sharp falls in value.

== History ==
Throughout human civilization, gold and silver were used as hard currencies with the use of gold as money beginning at around 600 BCE in Asia Minor. In the early and high Middle Ages, the Byzantine gold solidus or bezant was used widely throughout Europe and the Mediterranean. Over time, due to issues with divisibility, bimetallist standards emerged, with gold being used for large transactions and silver being used for small, day-to-day transactions. The adoption of bimetallism as internationally recognized hard currency developed rapidly when the ducat began to have a fixed value in terms of silver. The gold ducat originated in Venice in 1284 and gained international acceptance over the centuries.

With the rise of fiat currency, most notably from the 19th century to the modern day, paper currencies of some developed countries have earned recognition as hard currencies at various times. These currencies have included United States dollar, euro, British pound sterling, Japanese yen, Swiss franc and to a lesser extent the Canadian dollar, Australian dollar, New Zealand dollar, Swedish krona, Singapore dollar, and Hong Kong dollar. As times change, a currency that is considered weak at one time may become stronger, or vice versa; the Japanese yen is a recent example.

Despite their countries' large economies, neither the Chinese renminbi (yuan) nor the Indian rupee are considered "hard" currencies. The rupee is not widely used in international trade and is not fully convertible on the capital account. In addition, India has a large trade deficit, which exerts downward pressure on the currency. The renminbi is not traded on world exchanges and the government places many controls on exchanging the currency.

One measure of hard currencies is how they are favored within the foreign-exchange reserves of countries:

The percental composition of currencies of official foreign exchange reserves from 1995 to 2025.

== Turmoil ==
The US dollar (USD) has been considered a strong currency for much of its history. Despite the Nixon shock of 1971, and the United States' growing fiscal and trade deficits, most of the world's monetary systems have been tied to the US dollar due to the Bretton Woods system and dollarization. Countries have consequently been compelled to purchase dollars for their foreign exchange reserves, price their commodities in dollars for foreign trade, or even use dollars domestically, thus buoying the currency's value.

The euro (EUR) has also been considered a hard currency for much of its short history. However, the European sovereign debt crisis has partially eroded that confidence.

The Swiss franc (CHF) has long been considered a hard currency, and in fact was the last paper currency in the world to terminate its convertibility to gold on 1 May 2000, following a referendum. In the summer of 2011, the European sovereign debt crisis led to rapid flows out of the euro and into the Swiss franc by those seeking hard currency, causing it to appreciate rapidly. On 6 September 2011, the Swiss National Bank announced that it would buy an "unlimited" number of euros to fix an exchange rate at 1.00 EUR = 1.20 CHF to protect its trade. This action temporarily eliminated the Swiss franc's hard currency advantage over the euro, but was abandoned in January 2015.

While the Japanese yen has been widely regarded as a hard currency, its sharp decline in value since 2022 has led to a loss of global confidence. Japanese economist Izuru Katō satirically warns that the yen may effectively turned into a "junk currency".

The Freiwirtschaft economist Silvio Gesell criticized hard currency and argued that it is responsible for enabling recessions. In his book, The Natural Economic Order, Gesell wrote "The power of money to affect exchanges, its technical quality from the mercantile standpoint, is in inverse proportion to its technical quality from the banking standpoint." Gesell believed that since gold and other commodity-backed money are great for storing wealth, such money is therefore terrible for functioning as a medium of exchange, which he viewed to be the only legitimate function of money. In his view, "Only money that goes out of date like a newspaper, rots like potatoes, rusts like iron, evaporates like ether, is capable of standing the test as an instrument for the exchange of potatoes, newspapers, iron and ether." Gesell proposed that demurrage currency would solve the problems caused by hard currency.

American cigarettes were hard currency among civilians in Allied-occupied Germany after the end of World War II, because of the collapse in value of the Reichsmark.

== Demand ==
Investors as well as ordinary people generally prefer hard currencies to soft currencies at times of increased inflation (or, more precisely, times of increased inflation differentials between countries), at times of heightened political or military risk, or when they feel that one or more government-imposed exchange rates are unrealistic. There may be regulatory reasons for preferring to invest outside one's home currency, e.g. the local currency may be subject to capital controls which makes it difficult to spend it outside the host nation.

For example, during the Cold War, the ruble in the Soviet Union was not a hard currency because it could not be easily spent outside the Soviet Union and because the exchange rates were fixed at artificially high levels for persons with hard currency, such as Western tourists. (The Soviet government also imposed severe limits on how many rubles could be exchanged by Soviet citizens for hard currencies.) After the fall of the Soviet Union in December 1991, the ruble depreciated rapidly, while the purchasing power of the US dollar was more stable, making it a harder currency than the ruble. A tourist could get 200 rubles per US dollar in June 1992, and 500 ruble per dollar in November 1992.

In some economies, which may be either planned economies or market economies using a soft currency, there are special stores that accept only hard currency. Examples have included Torgsin and Beryozka stores in the former Soviet Union, Tuzex stores in former Czechoslovakia, Intershops in former East Germany, Pewex and Baltona in Poland, Comturist in Romania, Corecom in Bulgaria, Dollar stores in Cuba, or Friendship stores in China in the early 1990s. These stores offer a wider variety of goods – many of which are scarce or imported – than standard stores.

== Mixed currencies ==
Because hard currencies may be subject to legal restrictions, the desire for transactions in hard currency may lead to a black market. In some cases, a central bank may attempt to increase confidence in the local currency by pegging it against a hard currency, as is this case with the Hong Kong dollar or the Bosnia and Herzegovina convertible mark. This may lead to problems if economic conditions force the government to break the currency peg (and either appreciate or depreciate sharply) as occurred in the 1998–2002 Argentine great depression.

In some cases, an economy may choose to abandon local currency altogether and adopt another country's currency as legal tender. Examples include the adoption of the US dollar in Panama, Ecuador, El Salvador and Zimbabwe and the adoption of the German mark (and later the euro) in Serbia and Montenegro.

== See also ==
- Black Friday (1869) – Also referred to as the Gold Panic of 1869
- Card money in New France
- Commodity currency – Currency moving with commodity prices
- Currency strength – Foreign exchange trading indicator
- Fiat money – Currency not backed by any commodity
- Gold reserve – State-held stockpile of gold bullion
- Gold standard – Monetary system based on the value of gold
- Private currency – Issued by individual, company or group
- Representative money – Money whose face value is greater than its physical value
- Reserve currency – Currencies held by monetary authorities as part of their foreign exchange reserves
- Silver standard – Monetary system
