= Dollar store (Cuba) =

Cuban government shop that sold goods for hard currency

In Cuba between 1993 and 2004, a dollar store (Spanish: tienda de dólares), officially Tiendas de Recaudación de Divisas ("Foreign Currency Collection Shops") or Tiendas Recuperadoras de Divisas ("Foreign Currency Recovery Shops"), was a government-owned shop that sold goods solely in exchange for hard currency, originally mainly to foreigners and tourists, in the same way as a friendship store in the People's Republic of China or an Intershop in East Germany.

In 1993, Cuba made the United States dollar legal tender. The "dollar stores" accepted payment in US dollars and in Cuban convertible pesos.

In November 2004, the US dollar ceased to be legal tender to use in cash commercial transactions and was replaced by the Cuban convertible peso. However, the "dollar stores" remained open and despite their acceptance of only the convertible peso, the term "dollar stores" remained in colloquial use.

Starting in 2019, and greatly extended in 2020, a number of stores were converted with prices set in US dollars, and payment only by card - either special MLC cards (Moneda Libremente Convertible, "Freely Convertible Money") issued by Cuban entities or international cards such as Visa or Mastercard.
