= Baltona =

Polish corporation

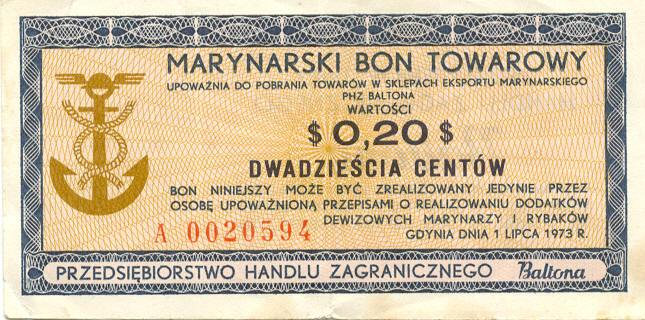
Seamen certificate worth US$0.20 in Baltona shops

Baltona (full: Baltona Foreign Trade Company Spółka Akcyjna, former Baltona - zaopatrywanie statków) is a Polish company acting mainly on a duty-free market in Poland and abroad.

== History ==
Baltona was established on 3 September 1946, as a private company. Its principal activity was supplying ships in Polish and foreign ports.

On 29 December 1949, Baltona was nationalized for the symbolic price of 1 Polish złoty. On 1 January 1951, the enterprise subordinated to the Polish Ministry of Foreign Trade. Its business consisted of supplying Polish ships, planes, diplomatic posts, airports, seaports, border crossings, and even scientific expeditions.

In 1957, Baltona joined the International Ship Suppliers Association (ISSA) and began exchanging information among ship chandlers.

In 1960, Baltona extended its operations to airport facilities by an agreement with LOT Polish Airlines to supply company's planes with goods intended for retail sale and consumption by crews and passengers.

The company grew and became a large export-import company during the 1970s and 1980s. During the time of the People's Republic of Poland, it was one of the few companies offering Western goods to Polish consumers for foreign currency. At the height of its popularity during the mid-1980s, Baltona operated nearly 250 stores and had over 2,000 employees. In 1984 it was transformed into a joint stock company (Polish: spółka akcyjna or S.A.).

In 2013, Baltona took over Chacalli de Decke, a Belgium-based duty-free company. It has since further developed operations in the food and beverages sector.

In 2020 Baltona left Warsaw Stock Exchange after being acquired by the Polskie Porty Lotnicze Capital Group.
