= Comturist =

Shops for tourists in communist Romania

Comturist was the name of the hard currency luxury shops that existed in Communist Romania, managed by the Ministry of Tourism. After the 1989 Romanian revolution, these stores became obsolete and were sold off in 1991 to private business owners; as a result of this sale by auction, the Comturist name is still in existence today in a more limited capacity, as a chain of duty-free stores.

About 200 Comturist stores were in existence in Romania by 1977, mainly in the largest cities and tourist areas. The Comturist stores existed explicitly to offer items that were not allowed to be sold in the then mainstream Romanian socialist economy. Imports from western Europe, North America and Japan were sold in these shops, such as: alcohol, tobacco, perfume, shoes, clothing, radios, televisions, pocket calculators and, by the 1980s, personal computers. High-quality Romanian souvenirs were also sold, such as: sheepskin, handicrafts, folk costumes and folk music records.

Originally the Comturist stores were geared toward foreign visitors, with a passport being required to visit them, but by the 1980s the requirement changed to allow any shopper who held foreign currency (which had to be declared and could be procured only via work done in the West or by remittances from foreign relatives).

Comturist SA, a private entity owned by former Communist elites-turned-capitalist entrepreneurs, was formed in September 1990 and bought off some of the remnants of the old Comturist chain in the March 1991 auctions. Comturist started trading on the Bucharest Stock Exchange in 2004.

== See also ==
- List of duty-free shops
