= Rifle (clothing company) =

Italian clothing company founded in 1958 in Prato

Rifle was an Italian clothing company founded in 1958 in Prato by the brothers Giulio and Fiorenzo Fratini. Filled for bankruptcy in 2018, and in October, 2020, the Tribunal of Florence declared bankruptcy for Rifle. The name Rifle became synonymous with the concept of jeans in eastern European countries. It was most famous for their jeans during the 1980s, especially in the USSR, Bulgaria, Romania, Poland, Czechoslovakia, and other areas behind the iron curtain. It was also very popular in Switzerland, the UK, Israel, the Netherlands and Colombia between 1975 and 1990. There were upscale lines of Rifle Jeans, called Super Rifle, Golden Rifle and Royal Rifle.

In October 2020, the Tribunal of Florence declared bankruptcy for Rifle with a provisional exercise for 45 days. Rifle was managed by CEO Franco Marianelli from 2018 through its bankruptcy.
