= Foreign exchange certificate =

Tool of foreign exchange control

A foreign exchange certificate (FEC) is a tool for foreign exchange control in countries where the national currency is subject to exchange controls or is not convertible. The arrangements vary significantly case by case.

== Common types ==
Some of the main types of FEC are:

- A certificate for purchasing foreign currency at a specified rate, often for a specified purpose, such as financing imports. This type of certificates were required in many European countries after World War II.
- A certificate denominated in local currency, which foreign citizens are required to use for some or all of their purchases. The exchange rate may be more favourable for the visitor than the official commercial rate. The purpose is to channel the foreign exchange to the state coffers instead of the black market. This type of FECs was in use in Germany in 1931–1948 and China in 1980–1994.
- A certificate to which local citizens are required to exchange any foreign currency they receive as part of their salary or as remittances from relatives or friends who live abroad. These certificates may be accepted as payment in specific stores, which otherwise sell goods only to foreign citizens in exchange for foreign currency. This type of FECs was issued in the Soviet Union between 1961 and 1989.
- Certificates for circulation in closed economic zones (for example, the Svalbard ruble for employees of the Arktikugol coal mines). The purpose of such certificates was to prevent a shortage of goods in the event of an uncontrolled influx of money from outside the zone.

== Examples ==
FECs denominated in national currency but with a special exchange rate / rules of circulation

- Soviet Union (Torgsin cheques in the 1930s, and various FEC types in 1961–1991, of which Vneshposyltorg cheques were the most common ones)
- China (1980–1994)
- East Germany (forum cheques, pegged to the West German D-Mark)
- North Korea (separate certificates and tokens for "socialist visitors" and "capitalist visitors" were in use between the 1970s and 2008)
- Cuba (from 1985, several different FECs (INTUR cheques) were issued, which were superseded when the US dollar was allowed to circulate, together with the convertible peso)
- Czechoslovakia (Tuzex)
- Bulgaria (Balkan Tourist, Corecom and People's Bank of Bulgaria cheques)
- Communist Romania (NAVROM cheques)
- Vietnam
- Communist Albania – it was illegal to exchange them for regular Albanian lek banknotes.
- Yugoslavia (Putnik cheques in the 1950s, People's Bank of Yugoslavia cheques in the 1980s)

FECs denominated in a foreign currency (usually the US dollar)

- Myanmar (Burma) (until March 2013)
- Poland (Bon Towarowy PeKaO)
- Zimbabwe (Zimbabwean bond notes and Zimbabwean bond coins)

== Gallery ==
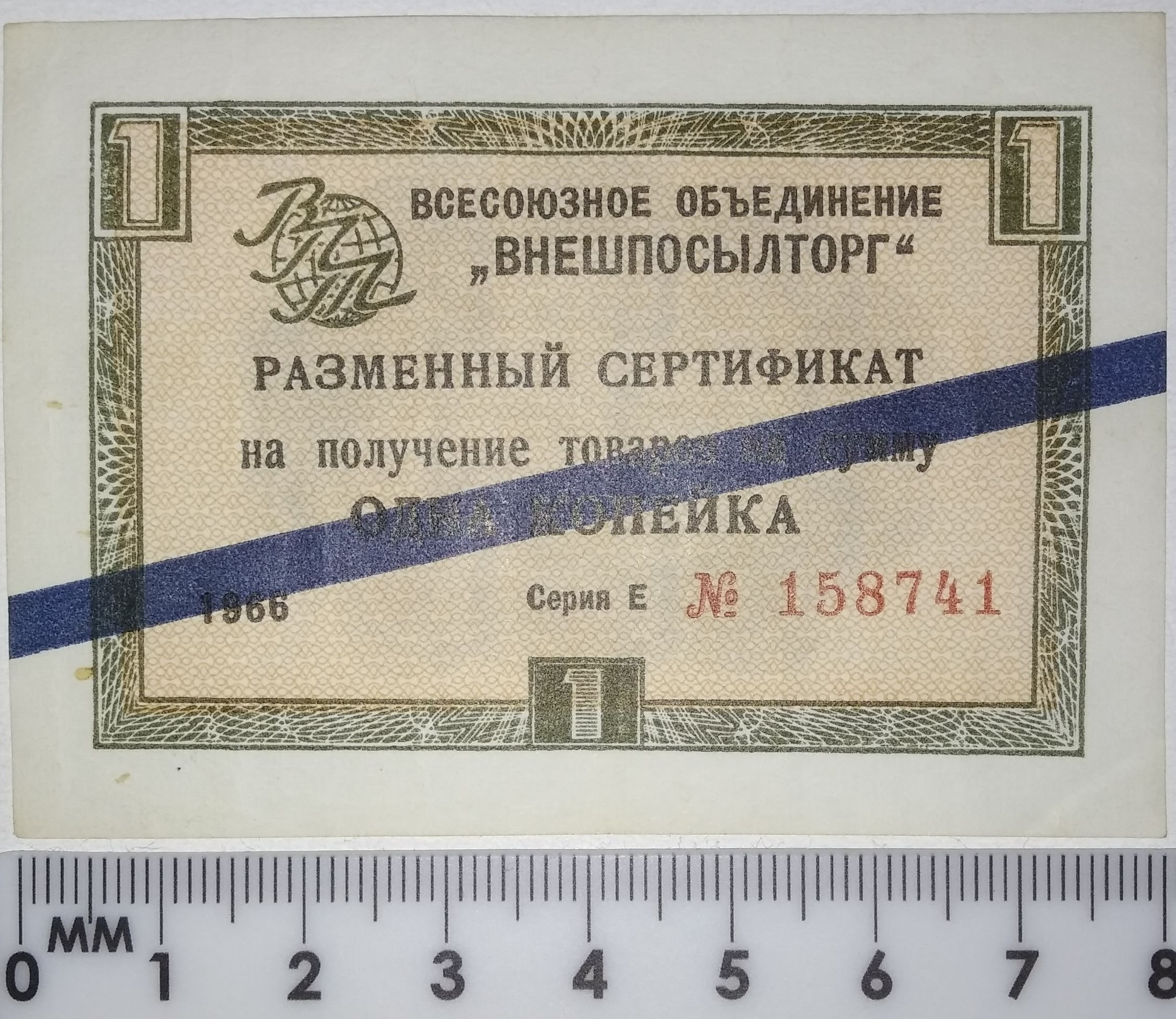
USSR FEC for Beryozka shops, 1 kopeck, blue stripe, 1966

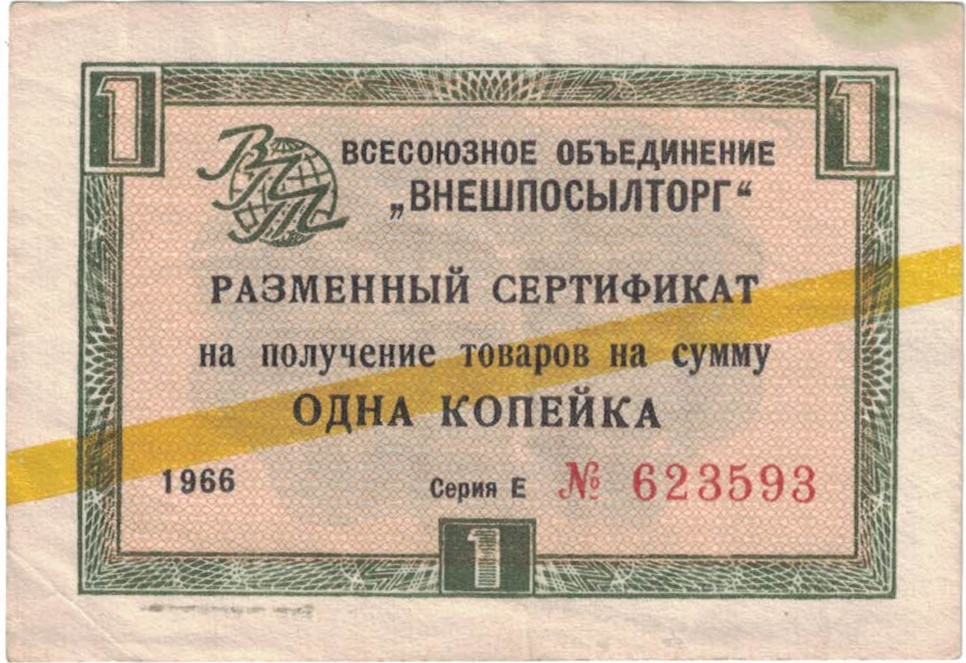
USSR FEC for Beryozka shops, 1 kopeck, yellow stripe, 1966

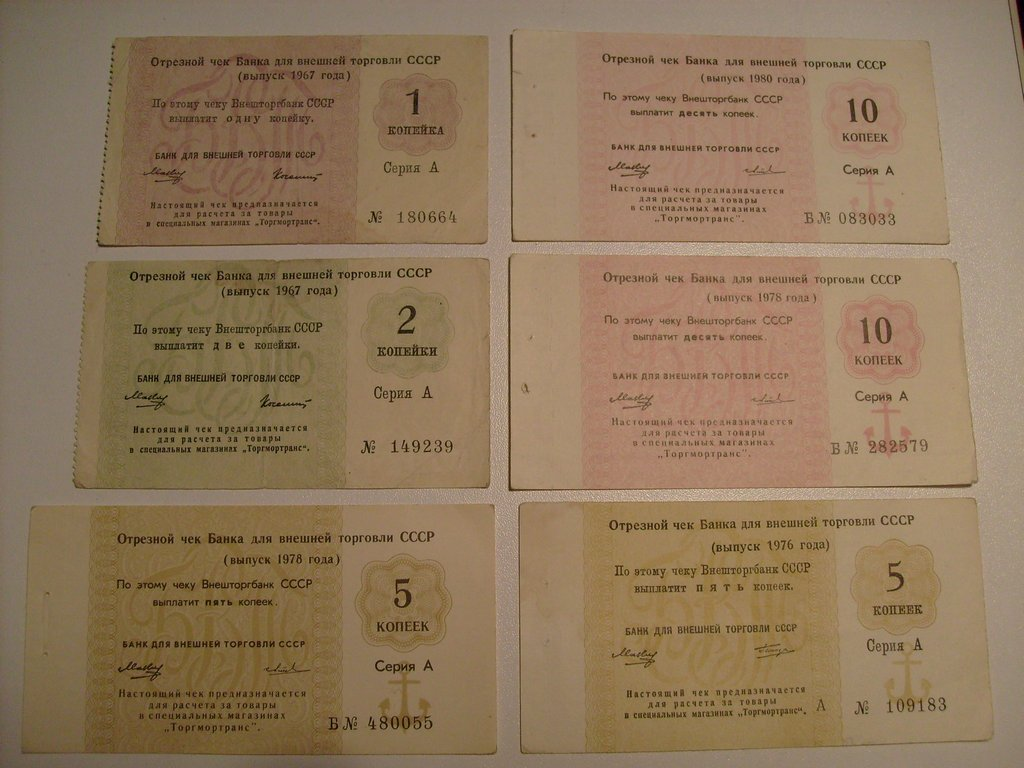
USSR FEC for sailors, Series A, (issues from 1967 to 1980)

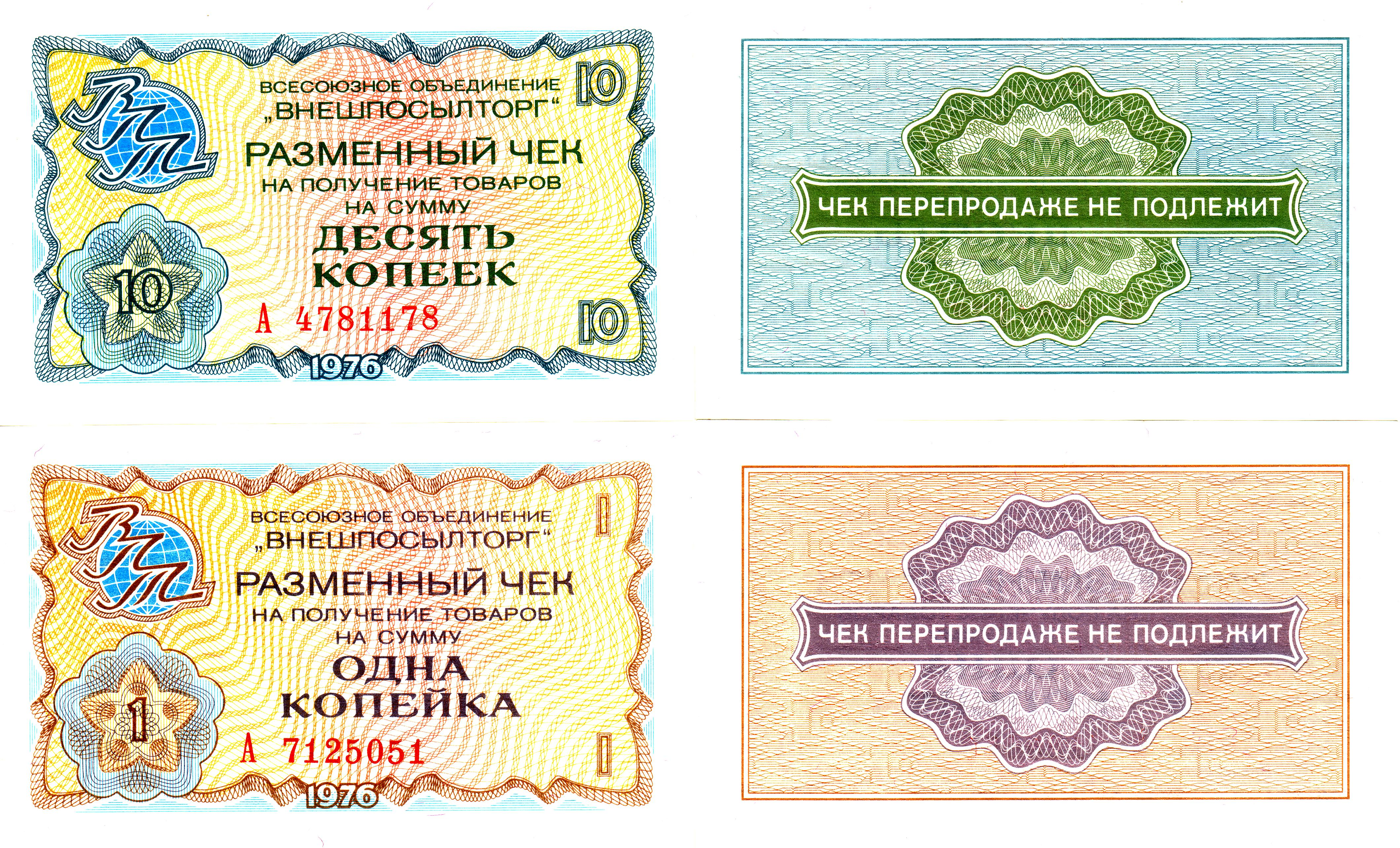
USSR Vneshposyltorg FEC, 1 and 10 kopecks, 1976

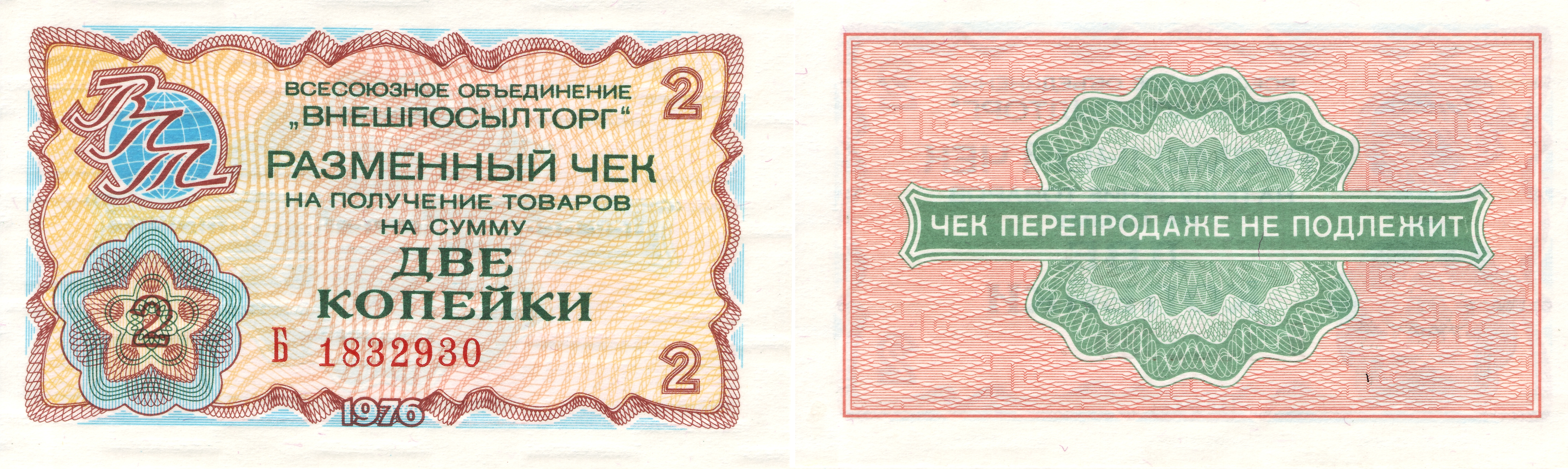
USSR Vneshposyltorg FEC, 2 kopecks, 1976

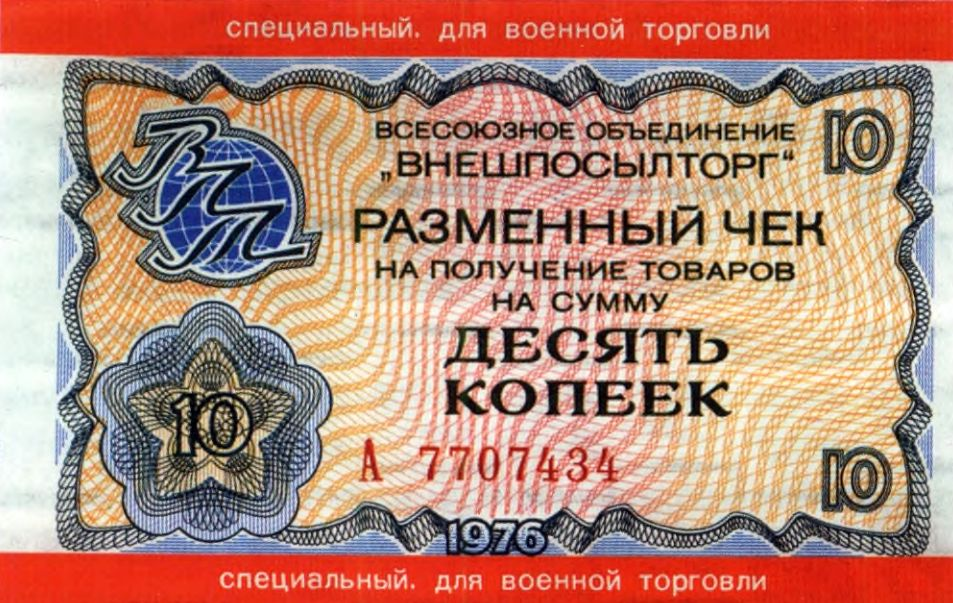
USSR Vneshposyltorg FEC, 10 kopecks, for the military, 1976

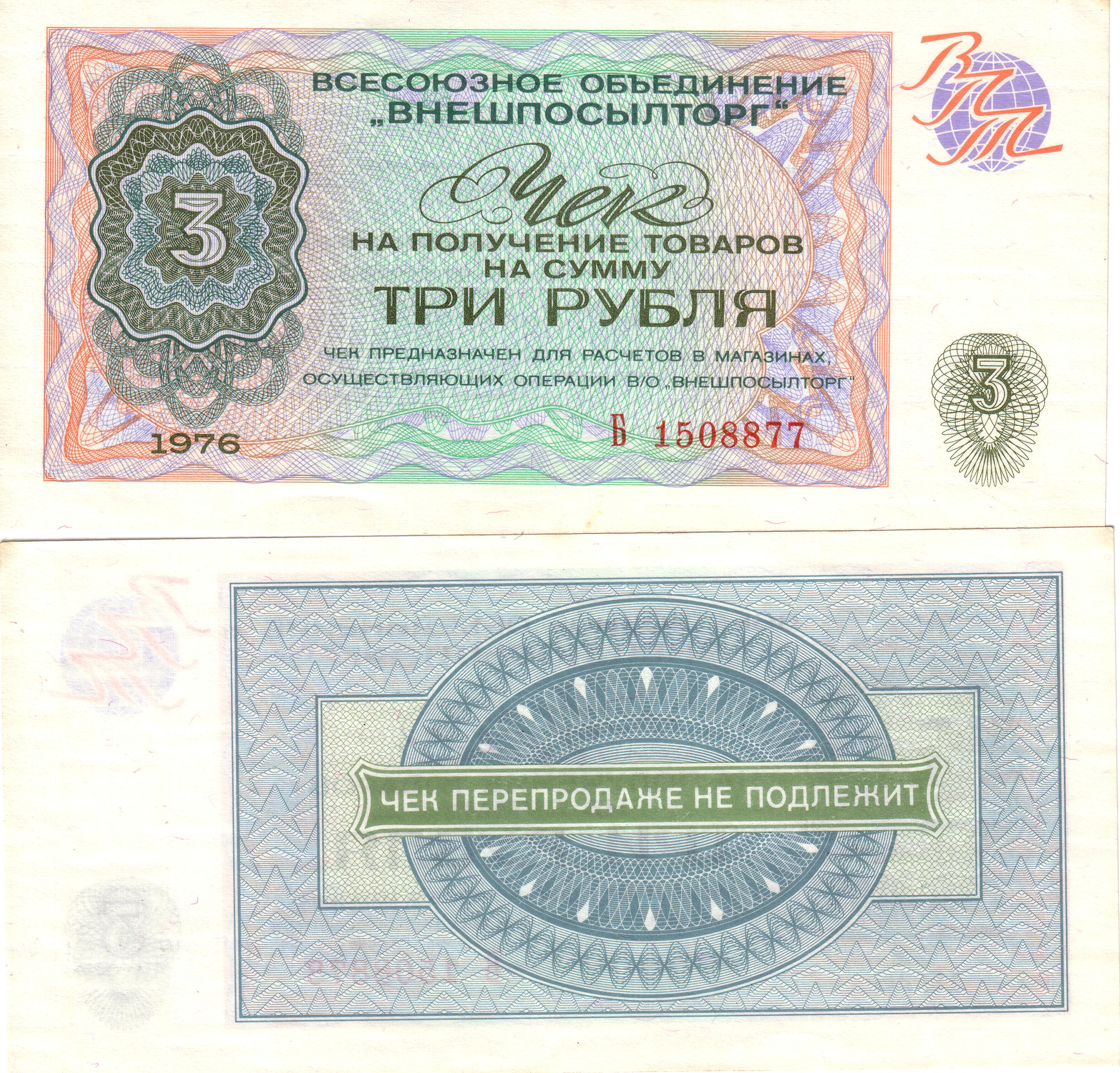
USSR Vneshposyltorg FEC, 3 rubles, 1976

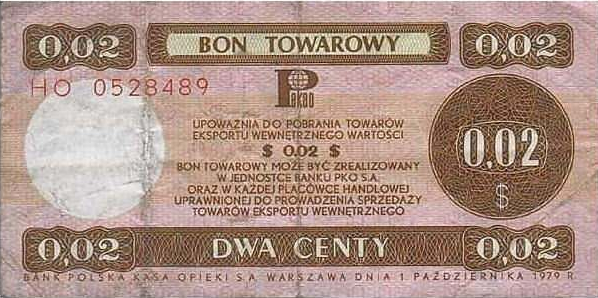
PeKaO FEC, Poland

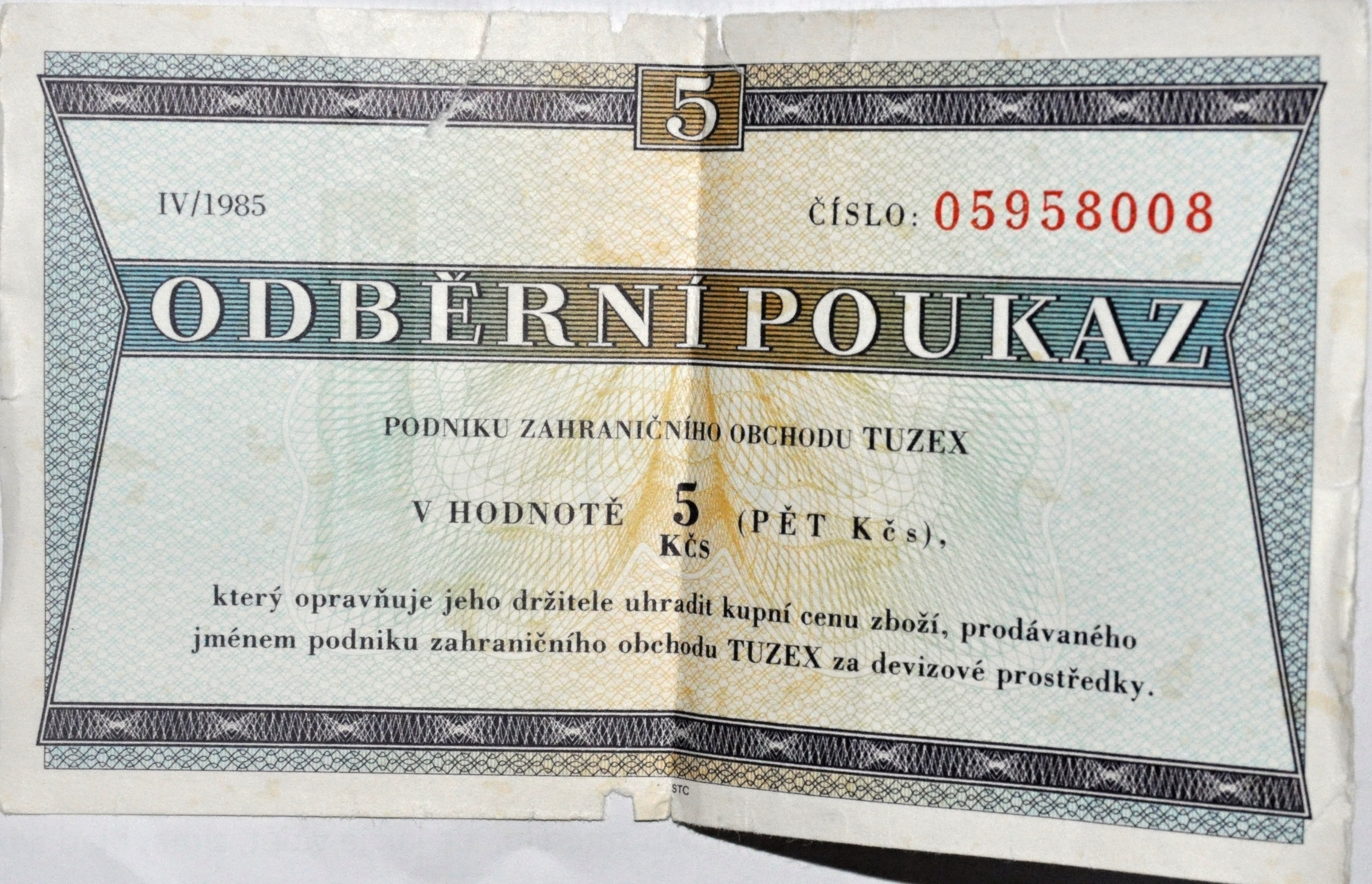
Tuzex FEC, Czechoslovakia

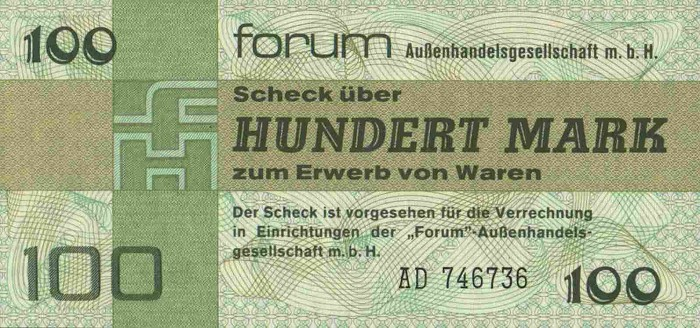
Forumscheck, East Germany
