= Intershop =

Retail store in the GDR

Intershop's logo

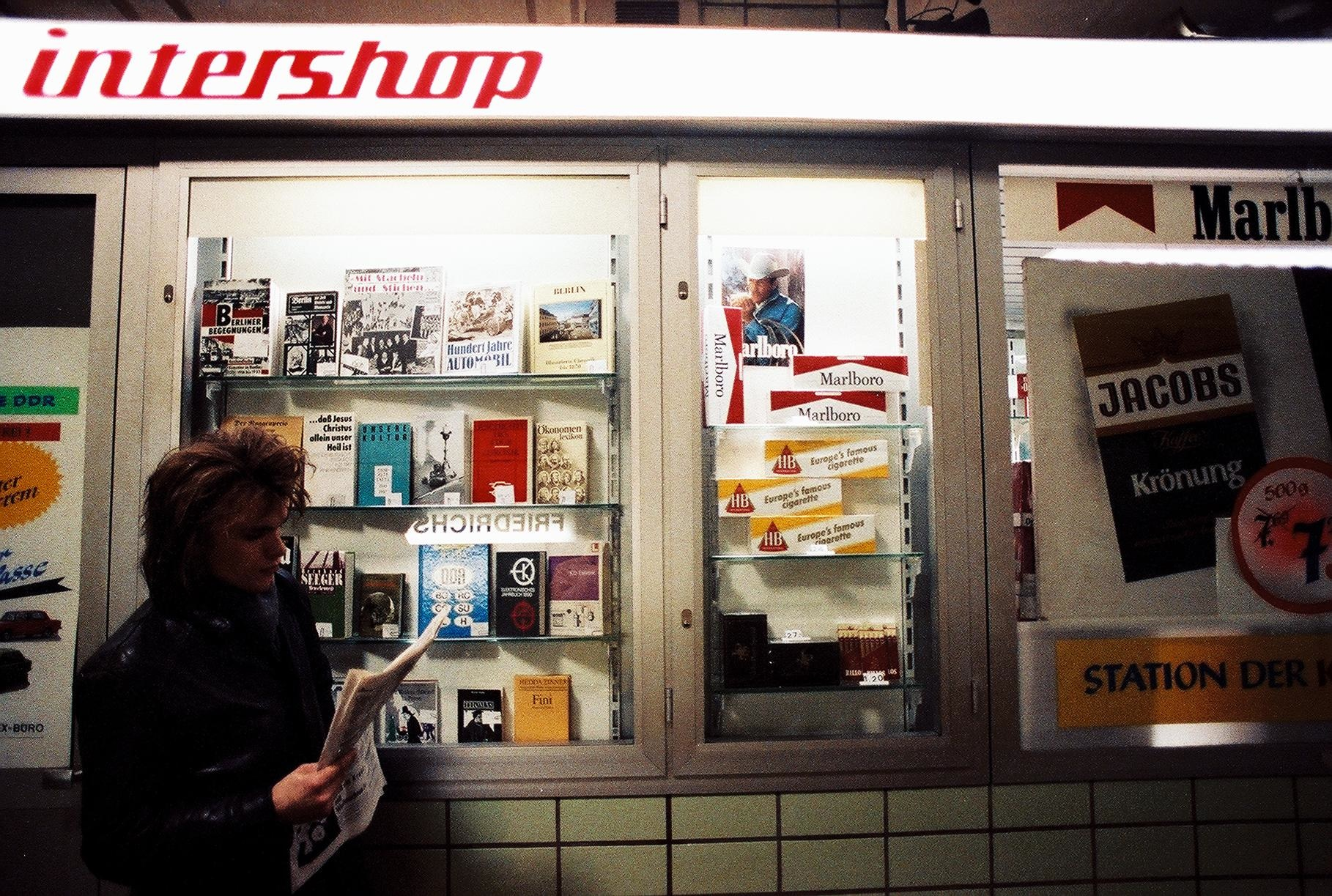
The Intershop in Berlin Friedrichstraße underground train station, accessible from West Berlin only, c. 1990, the only one with shop windows. East German books, as on display here, were not sold in normal Intershop stores.

Intershop was a chain of government-owned and operated retail stores in the German Democratic Republic (GDR, East Germany) from 1962 until 1990 in which only hard currencies (and later Forum checks) could be used to purchase high-quality goods, usually from or associated with Western countries. The East German mark was not accepted as payment. Intershop was originally oriented towards visitors from Western countries and, later, became an outlet where East Germans could purchase goods they could not otherwise obtain. An unintended consequence was that ordinary East Germans had some insight into the selection of goods available in the West, which they could then compare with the rather limited offerings available in their own country.

== Product offerings ==
Intershops sold imported products, such as cigarettes, liquor, appliances and even car accessories. It even sold quality East German products that were exported and then, re-imported. Those items were sometimes sold at a lower price than the same product sold in domestic shops.

== History ==
Intershop was founded on 14 December 1962 as a publicly owned company (Volkseigener Betrieb - VEB). Its purpose was to increase the flow of hard currency into the GDR. There was such a lack of foreign currency that even small amounts were welcome. The groups targeted were mainly tourists and other foreigners in transit from the West. The first mobile carts were in the Berlin Friedrichstraße station, where tax-free cigarettes were sold for much less than in West Berlin. Little by little, alcohol and other goods were gradually added. By 1962, annual sales totalled more than one million West German marks (DM).

Originally, Intershop was organised as a division of Mitropa, the company that provided catering services to the Deutsche Reichsbahn. With the arrival of the first Interhotels, which were intended to house Western tourists, Intershops also began appearing in these Western-oriented hotels. One could also purchase items in one's room (via room service) with hard currency. Over time, these hotel-based Intershops grew as well.

Later, Intershops were opened at border crossings, rest stops and transit stops on the GDR Autobahns, railway stations, bus stations, ferry terminals and airports. As an example of the GDR regime's desire for hard currency, in the 1980s, in the Berlin Friedrichstraße underground (U-Bahn) station, there was an Intershop kiosk on the platform of the U6 line created specifically for travellers from West Berlin who may not have wanted to pass through the GDR border controls. One could disembark from the underground train, make a purchase and then, get back on the next train and go back to West Berlin, all without passing through the GDR border controls. Purchases could be paid for with any fully convertible currency, such as: U.S. dollars, pounds sterling, Swiss francs and, especially, West German marks.

Until 1974, GDR citizens were not allowed to hold foreign currency. By decree of the Council of Ministers of the GDR (Ministerrat der DDR), this ban was relaxed in that year, and East Germans were then allowed to shop in most Intershops. The Intershops at Autobahn rest stops (so-called "Transitshops"), which were sometimes self-service, were still only for travellers from non-socialist countries and required travel documents for entry. Additionally, certain duty-free items such as tobacco, spirits, coffee, perfume, brand name clothing, watches and jewellery required a foreign passport. The prices for these goods were significantly lower than in West Germany or West Berlin, while the other goods that would have interested East Germans were relatively expensive. East Germans could not legally exchange East German marks for hard currency. The only legal ways for East Germans to acquire hard currency were either as gifts from relatives living in the West or wages earned for work in Western countries.

For East Germans without hard currency, there were 300 Exquisit shops (which sold higher priced clothing, shoes, and cosmetics) from 1962 onwards and 550 Delikat shops (which sold high end and gourmet food items) from 1976 onwards. Most of the goods sold in Exquisit and Delikat shops were of East German origin but were normally unavailable in the regular state-run stores. These shops were intended to give East Germans access to high-quality goods and to absorb surplus purchasing power.

In 1977, Erich Honecker said: "These shops obviously aren't permanent companions of socialism. But, we can't ignore the fact that the rising number of visitors is bringing more such currency among us than before". Honecker made these remarks in response to criticism that Intershops were a key-driver of inequality. In the same speech, Honecker defended trade with capitalist countries. He said: "Naturally, we haven't overlooked the fact that the citizens of the German Democratic Republic who have no such funds are at a disadvantage, in a certain sense, compared to those who have such currency at their disposal". Honecker said the 9.5 million yearly visitors from capitalist countries "who eat with us, usually spend the night and obviously also have money in their pockets. Through the Intershops, we have created the possibility that these funds stay with us in the country".

Starting in April 1979, East Germans were required to convert hard currency at the East German state bank (Staatsbank der DDR) into the so-called forum check. A forum check mark had a value of one West German mark. The Forum Außenhandelsgesellschaft mbH was responsible for the management of Intershops and had 900 employees.

By 1978, there were reportedly 100 Intershops in operation across East Germany. It was noted that Intershop gave an opportunity for West German companies, as well as companies based in the West, to sell consumer goods to a communist bloc country. The rise of Intershop was noted to have created a visibly separate social class in East Germany, where people who had access to an Intershop, as well as the means to shop there, were seen consuming items offered by the chain. Consumerism promoted by the existence of Intershop also caused labour disputes in some areas, with workers demanding part of their salary to be paid in hard currency, so that they could shop at Intershop.

The Ministry of State Security (Stasi) monitored the Intershops very closely, with relatives of Stasi employees or officials often working as cashiers. In some stores, security cameras were present and, in the beginning, passports were even checked. The transport of these goods was closely monitored as well. Even so, there were numerous thefts and even some armed robberies of Intershop stores. The investigations of these crimes always involved the Stasi, as well as the regular police. In many cases, store managers and employees were involved in the crimes. Beginning in the 1980s, a portion of the salary of Intershop workers was paid in hard currency and additionally employees had to surrender their tips, according to regulations, in order to curb these problems.

The Intershops were dissolved upon the reunification of Germany, in 1990.

Because photographing in Intershops was not allowed, there are few photographs of the inside of the stores. Most of those that do exist are from the Stasi archives. A West German photographer, Günter Schneider, collected numerous photos of Intershops while working on a larger report about the transit corridors in East Germany.

== See also ==
- Pewex; Polish counterpart
- Beryozka; Soviet counterpart
- Eastern Bloc economies
