= Prostitution in East Germany =

Although prostitution in East Germany was outlawed in 1968, it was partially tolerated thereafter.

The State Security Service (Stasi) used prostitutes (Mielke's Maidens) for gaining information.

A quotation from Uta Falck summarises prostitution in the GDR as follows: "In the GDR, all parties benefited from prostitution: the rich women, the satisfied suitors, the informed state. So much satisfaction it will hardly ever be more in this industry."

== History ==
After the Second World War, prostitution served primarily to secure a livelihood. Street prostitutes were far less likely to suffer violence than in other countries, partly because pimps were not part of the system. The main focus of the state during this period was the containment of infectious diseases. The incidence of STDs was 1%. Sick prostitutes were usually assigned to care homes and closed hospital departments to treat the disease and try and change their lifestyle. Forced examinations of (mainly female) guests of entertainment venues as well as employees of the state health authorities and the police were carried out to stem the spread of sexually transmitted diseases.

From the mid-1950s, prostitution was seen as incompatible with the socialist image of women. An attempt was made to persuade prostitutes to take up a regular job through intimidation or instruction in "homes for social care". This led to many part-time prostitutes. After the Berlin wall was built in 1961, the authorities thought that total isolation from the West would cause prostitution to disappear. This wasn't the case and in 1968, prostitution was outlawed and thus street prostitution largely disappeared.

Although prostitution was banned, it was tolerated, especially in hotels used by visiting foreigners, particularly in Leipzig (Leipzig Trade Fair) and Rostock (Rostock harbor). Starting in the late 1960s, prostitutes were used by the Ministry of State Security to collect information.

After German reunification prostitution became legal. Prostitutes moved freely around the unified Germany.

== Law ==
Until 1968, under § 361 para. 6 of the Criminal Code, prostitution was prohibited near churches, schools and child and youth facilities. In addition, the deliberate spread of sexually transmitted diseases was punishable by imprisonment of up to three years. The operation of brothels was prohibited (§ 180 and 181 of the Criminal Code).

Prostitution in the GDR was banned on 12 January 1968 (§ 249 (1) StGB (GDR) "endangering public order by antisocial behaviour") and could be punished with imprisonment up to two years (five years for 2nd offences). In addition, the promotion and exploitation of prostitution was criminalised.

== HWG categorisation ==
Prostitutes and sexually promiscuous women were categorised by the health authorities as a HwG-Person ("Person mit häufig wechselndem Geschlechtspartnern" English: person who has frequently changing sexual partners) and specially monitored. This term was not specific to the GDR, it was already used as a term by authorities at the end of the German Empire, and was used in a similar way by health officials in post war West Germany.

== Prostitution and state security ==
From the late 1960s, the Ministry of State Security (Stasi) used both male and female prostitutes to gather information. They were known as "Mielke’s Maidens" after Stasi chief Erich Mielke.

The objectives were:

- Learning details about the life of the clients
- To obtain information about the sexual deviations of the clients for later extortion
- Build relationships

The fact that prostitution was banned was exploited by state security to encourage women to work for them as informers. Stasi officers scoured the streets of East Berlin looking for candidates. Once found, the women were told their "criminal activities" would be overlooked if they worked for the Stasi. The women would still be paid by the clients and they would also be paid for information. Working for the Stasi also gave the women security. In addition, students were specifically recruited to contact persons from non-socialist countries. The catalogue of requirements of the State Security was: "Between 20 and 30, unmarried, no children, foreign language skills, good-looking, educated, analytical skills and patriotism".

== Prostitution and international guests ==
Red-light districts did not exist. However, prostitution was tolerated especially during the Leipzig Trade Fair, in hotels used by foreigners (Interhotel) and the international seaports (in particular Rostock).

In Leipzig, the Hotel Deutschland was bugged and the Stasi encouraged the girls to take their clients there. A similar situation existed at the Hotel Neptun in Warnemünde. There the barmaid, Ute, was a Stasi agent.

Other hotels and bars have been known to house prostitutes:

- Palasthotel (Berlin)
- Hotel Metropol (Berlin)
- Park Inn Berlin (Berlin)
- Yucca Bar (Berlin)
- Alibi Bar (Berlin)
- Hotel Merkur (Leipzig)
- Hotel Astoria (Leipzig)
- Hotel International (Leipzig)
- Storchenbar (Rostock)

State security installed sound and video surveillance systems in some of the hotel rooms.

== Motivation and demography ==
From the 1960s, women in the GDR were not entering prostitution out of economic necessity, but motivation was rather the prospect of Westgeld (West German Marks), lust for sexuality or adventure. The pay was not necessarily in cash, but also gifts ("gifts sex"). While payment was made in Westmark, their income far exceeded that of an employee and allowed the purchase of luxury goods from Intershop, Delikat and Exquisit shops.

While in the post-war period, the proportion of prostitutes from the lower class was high and also many expellees worked as prostitutes. In the 1970s prostitutes came from all social classes (with a focus of the lower and middle class). The proportion of prostitutes with a vocational training or with a professional or university degree was at least above average.

The total number of prostitutes and clients was significantly lower compared to West Germany. An estimate suggests 3,000 prostitutes. In addition, however, there were women who were rewarded with gifts and didn't see themselves as prostitutes.

== Access to prostitution ==
There were very few street prostitutes after prostitution was banned in 1968. There were a few on the streets in East Berlin, and also some in Leipzig when the Trade Fairs were held. Generally access to prostitutes was random or through acquaintances and informal contacts.

== See also ==
- Prostitution in Germany

== Bibliography ==
- Brüning, Steffi (2020), Prostitution in der DDR. Eine Untersuchung am Beispiel der Städte Rostock, Berlin und Leipzig von 1968 bis 1989 (in German), be.bra Verlag, ISBN 978-3-95410-217-4
- Falck, Uta (1998), Veb Bordell: Geschichte Der Prostitution in Der Ddr (in German), Ch. Links, ISBN 9783861531616
- Frölke, René; Mauersberger, Kerstin (2006), Leipzig - Sex and the city: das Nachtleben der DDR-Messestadt (in German), OCLC 753812022
- Heberer, Eva-Maria (2013), Prostitution: An Economic Perspective on its Past, Present, and Future, Springer Fachmedien Wiesbaden, ISBN 9783658044954
- Schmeidel, John Christian (August 2007), Stasi: Shield and Sword of the Party, Routledge, ISBN 9781138010413
- von Dücker, Elisabeth, ed. (2005), Sexarbeit: Prostitution-Lebenswelten und Mythen (in German), Edition Temmen, ISBN 9783861085423
- Wellner, Benjamin (2008), Prostitution in der DDR - "Von der 'Gefahr für die Volksgesundheit' zum Werkzeug der Stasi-Spionage": Weibliche Prostitution zu Zeiten des Arbeiter- und Bauernstaates (in German), GRIN Verlag, ISBN 9783640194797
