= Westin Michigan Avenue Chicago =

Hotel in Chicago, Illinois, U.S.

The Westin Michigan Avenue Chicago
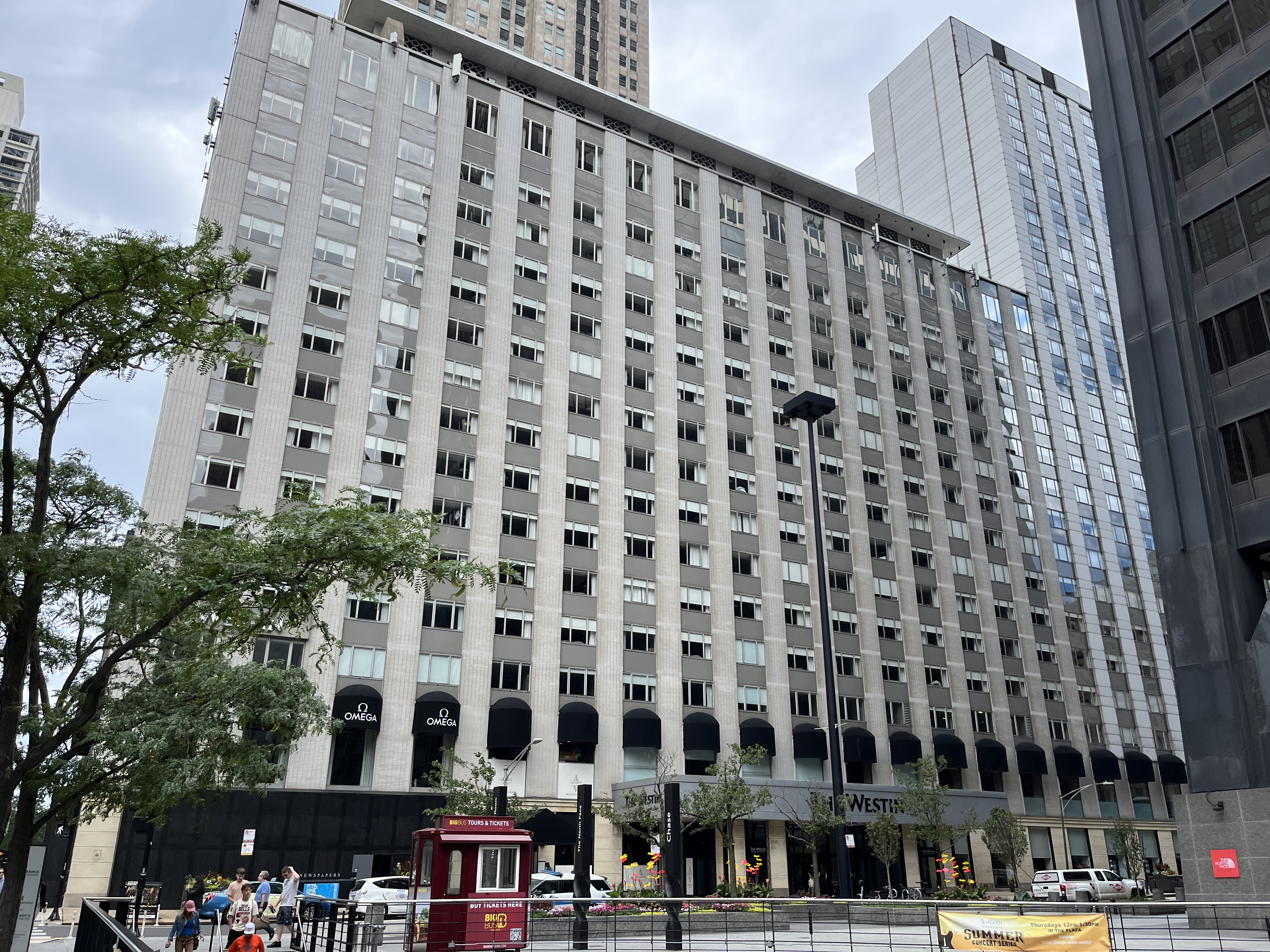
- Original 1963 wing center, 1974 tower addition on the right
- Interactive map of the The Westin Michigan Avenue Chicago area
- Former names: The Continental Plaza; The Westin

General information
- Location: 909 Michigan Avenue, Chicago, Illinois, U.S.
- Coordinates: 41°53′58″N 87°37′25″W
- Opened: November 23, 1963; 62 years ago

The Westin Michigan Avenue Chicago is a hotel in Chicago, in the U.S. state of Illinois.

== Description and history ==
The Continental Plaza was scheduled to open on November 22, 1963, but its opening was postponed to the following day, due to the assassination of John F. Kennedy that day. Scheduled for November 29, 1963, the grand opening festivities were cancelled.

Operated by Western International Hotels, the hotel had 15 floors and 400 rooms until August 1974, when its size practically doubled with the completion of a 27-story extension. Western International was renamed Westin Hotels in 1981, and the hotel was renamed soon after, becoming The Westin.

Before its workers went on strike in 2018, the hotel had been renamed The Westin Michigan Avenue in the 1990s, as well as being renovated in 2008. The ground floor has approximately 5,860 square feet of retail space, which was purchased by Blatteis & Schnur in March 2023.

On December 3, 2025, Pebblebrook Hotel Trust announced that it had completed the sale of the hotel for $72 million to an unidentified investor.
