= The Westin Grand Berlin =

Hotel in Berlin, Germany

Coordinates: 52.5161°N 13.3886°E

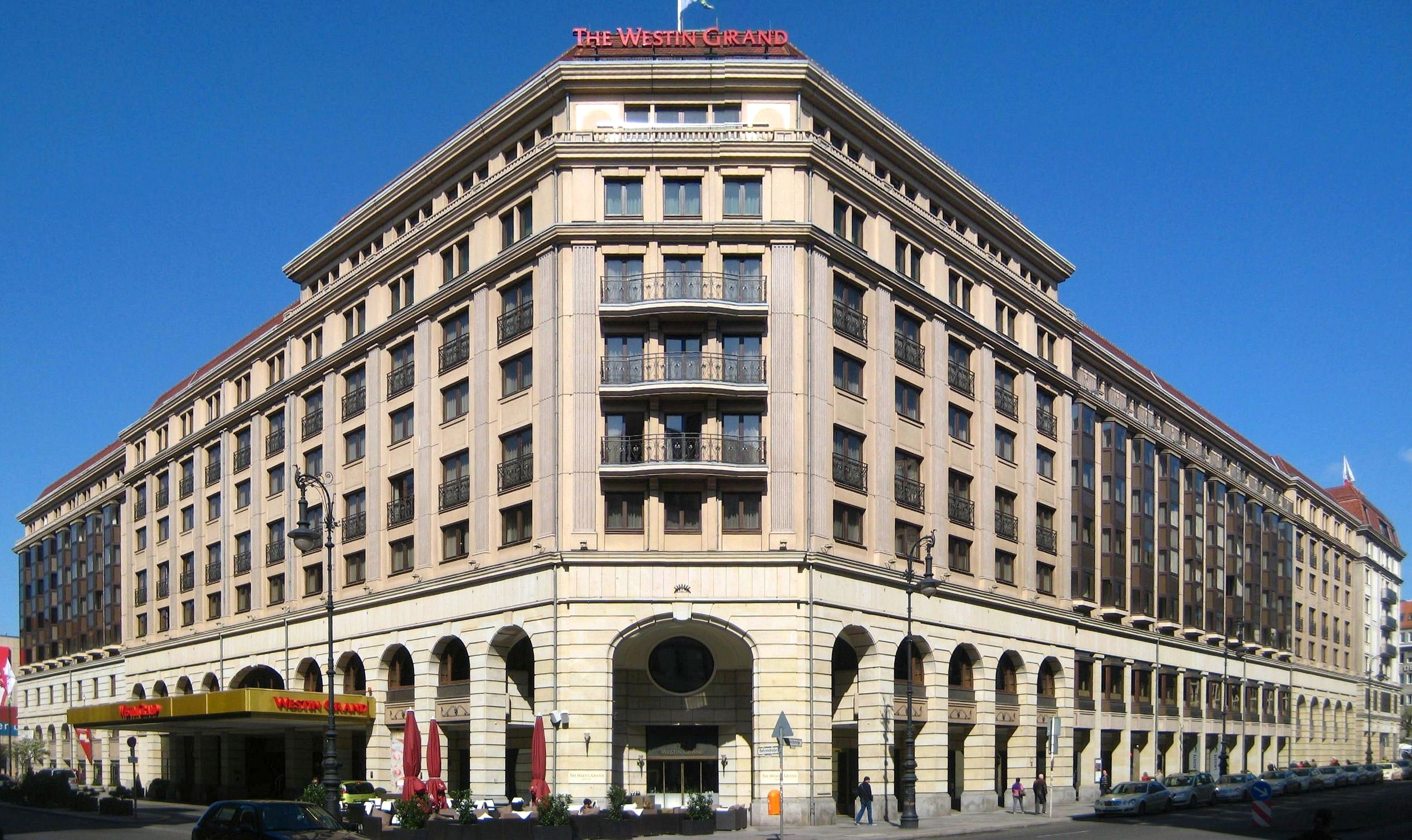
- The Westin Grand Berlin, 2010

General information
- Location: Berlin, Germany, Friedrichstrasse 158–164
- Opening: August 1, 1987
- Operator: Westin Hotels & Resorts

Design and construction
- Architect: Erhardt Gisske

Other information
- Number of rooms: 400

Website
- Official website

The Westin Grand Berlin is a luxury business hotel located on Friedrichstraße in the Mitte district of Berlin, Germany.

== History ==
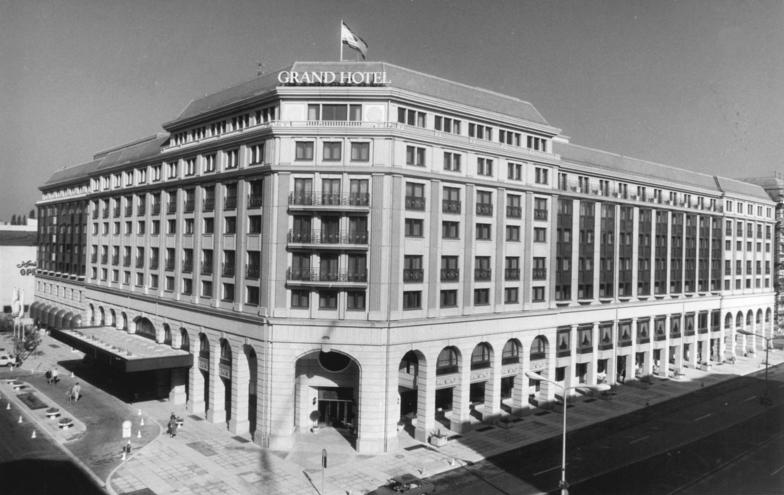
Grand Hotel Berlin seen on August 12, 1987, just after opening

The site is the former location of the Kaisergalerie shopping center, opened in 1873, destroyed by an air raid in 1943, and demolished in 1957.

The site remained vacant until the East German state-run Interhotel monopoly decided to build a flagship luxury hotel for Western tourists in the 1980s. The structure was designed by a collective of architects headed by noted East German architect Erhardt Gisske in the style of early twentieth century luxury hotels, and with a glass dome modeled on the one in the former Kaisergalerie. The East German government hired the Japanese Kajima Corporation to manage the building of the 200 million mark structure, and Kajima in turn subcontracted the construction work to the Swedish Siab construction company. The hotel was opened as the Grand Hotel Berlin on August 1, 1987 by East German leader Erich Honecker as part of the city-wide celebrations of the 750th anniversary of the founding of Berlin. It was only open to foreign guests, as it did not accept East German Marks, only Western hard currencies.

Following German unification in 1990, the hotel, along with other East German state assets, became the property of the Treuhandanstalt, a German government agency set up to privatize such properties. It was managed by the German Maritim Hotels chain and renamed Maritim Grand Hotel Berlin. The hotel was eventually sold, along with a number of other former Deutsche Interhotels properties, and renamed The Westin Grand Berlin on July 1, 1997.

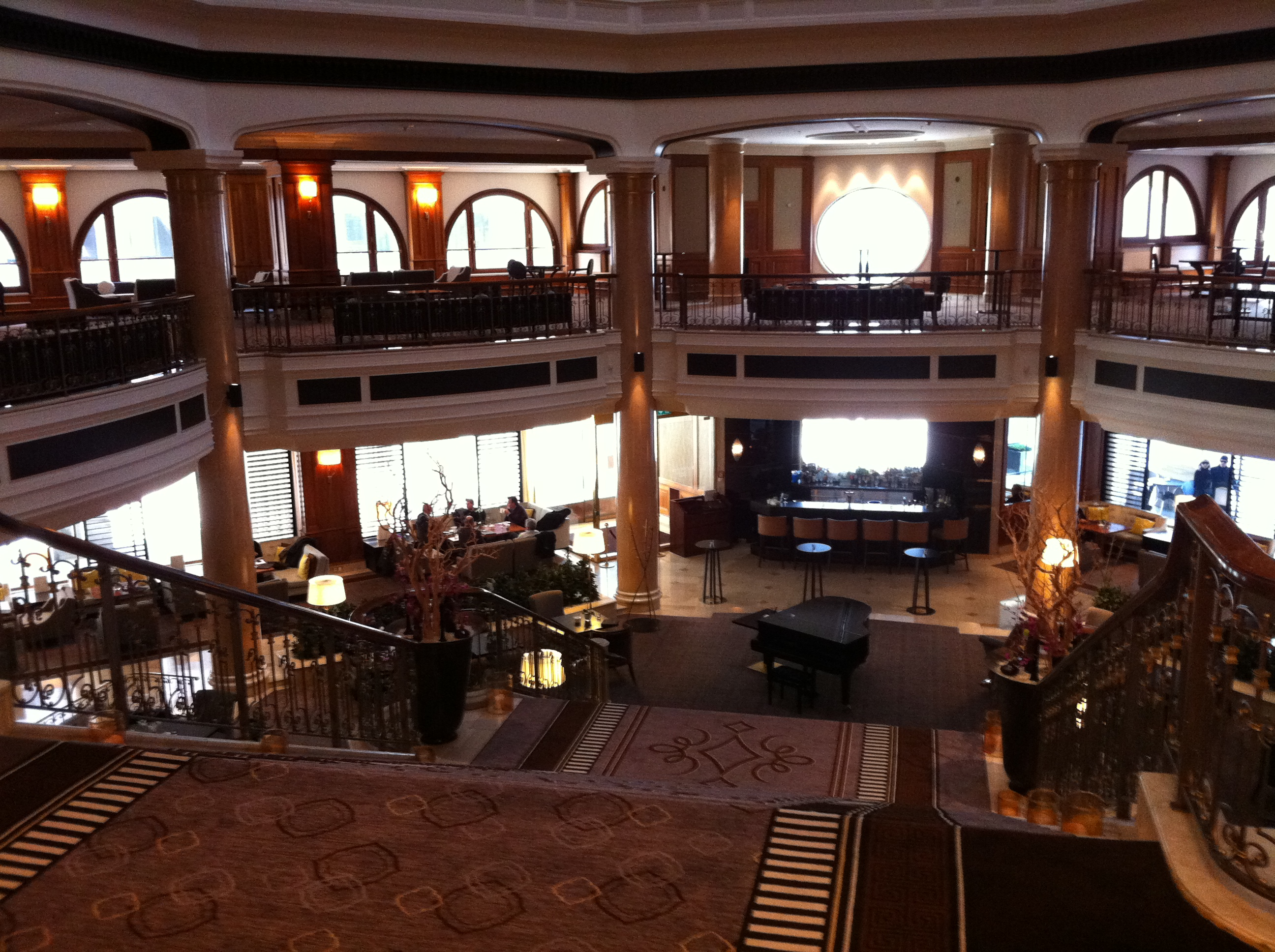
Atrium lobby of The Westin Grand Berlin, 2011

The Blackstone Group bought a group of fourteen former Deutsche Interhotels, including the Westin Grand, in 2007. Blackstone renovated and remodeled the hotel from November 2007 to April 2008, including the addition of a seventh floor on top, adding 41 new rooms. Blackstone sold the ten Deutsche Interhotels properties they still owned, including the Westin Grand, to Starwood Capital and Brookfield Asset Management in 2014.

== In popular culture ==
Parts of the 2004 film The Bourne Supremacy were filmed in the hotel.

Famous guests have included: Peter Falk, Peter Ustinov, Larry Hagman, Pamela Anderson, and Plácido Domingo.

The 2015 film Victoria included scenes of the Westin Grand lobby and its hotel rooms.
