= The Westin Leipzig =

Hotel in Leipzig, Germany

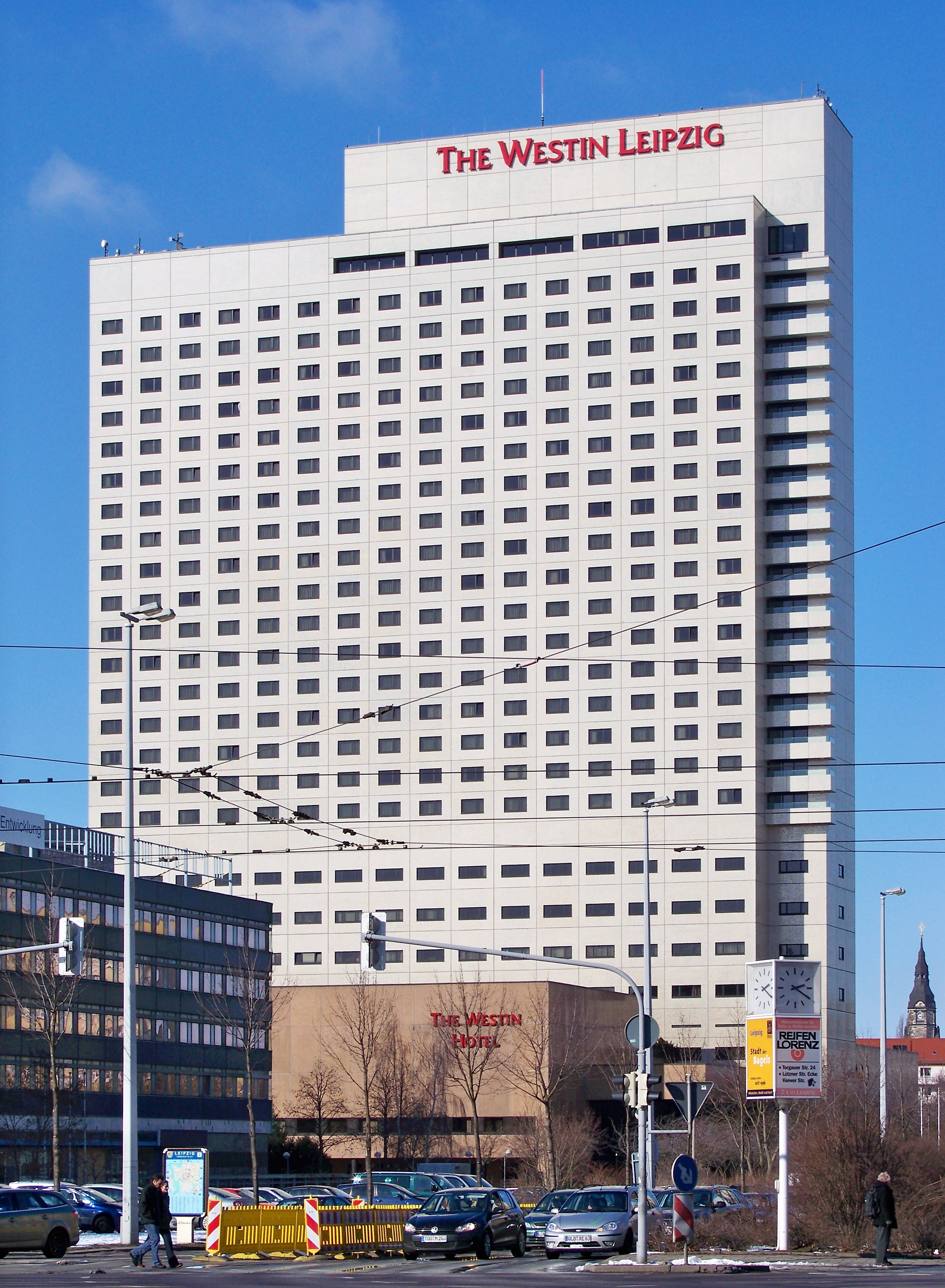
- Alternative names: Hotel Merkur; Hotel InterContinental Leipzig

General information
- Status: Completed
- Type: Hotel
- Location: Gerberstraße 15; Leipzig, Germany
- Coordinates: 51°20′47.68″N 12°22′32.37″E
- Construction started: 1979
- Completed: 1981
- Opening: 13 March 1981
- Cost: 16.1 billion Japanese yen
- Operator: Westin Hotels & Resorts

Height
- Roof: 96 m (315 ft)

Technical details
- Floor count: 27

Design and construction
- Architects: Kajima architects, Tokyo
- Developer: Limex-Bau Export-Import, East Berlin
- Main contractor: Kajima, Tokyo

Other information
- Number of rooms: 436

The Westin Leipzig is a hotel in Leipzig, Germany. At 96.8 m (318 ft) tall, it is the second-tallest building in Leipzig as of 2023. Constructed for the GDR hotel chain Interhotel as Hotel Merkur, the hotel has been operated by Westin Hotels & Resorts since 2003. It features 436 rooms on 27 floors, of which 17 are guest floors and three are office floors. There is a swimming pool and a wellness area on the fourth floor. The hotel houses the Brühl restaurant and the Falco and Shinto bars.

== History ==
=== Planning ===
In the concept for the Leipzig Trade Fair in 1971, the construction of additional hotels for trade fair visitors from abroad was a priority task. The urban planners from the office of the chief architect of the city of Leipzig had examined and proposed several locations. But things turned out differently. The draft by the architects from Kajima was already complete; the only thing that had to be done in Leipzig was finding a suitable plot of land and making it available. A location was chosen that had not previously been intended for a high-rise dominant.

The contract to build the 5-star hotel was signed in 1978 between the GDR foreign trade company Limex and the Japan GDR Project Company. Kajima took over the project planning and execution. The cost of construction was 16.1 billion Japanese yen. This corresponded to around 157 million Deutschmarks at an average exchange rate traded on international exchange markets on 1 January 1981. The foundation stone was laid in September 1978. All of the precast concrete parts needed to build the outer facades were delivered from West Berlin. On 31 January 1981 Kajima handed over the import object to the Interhotel association.

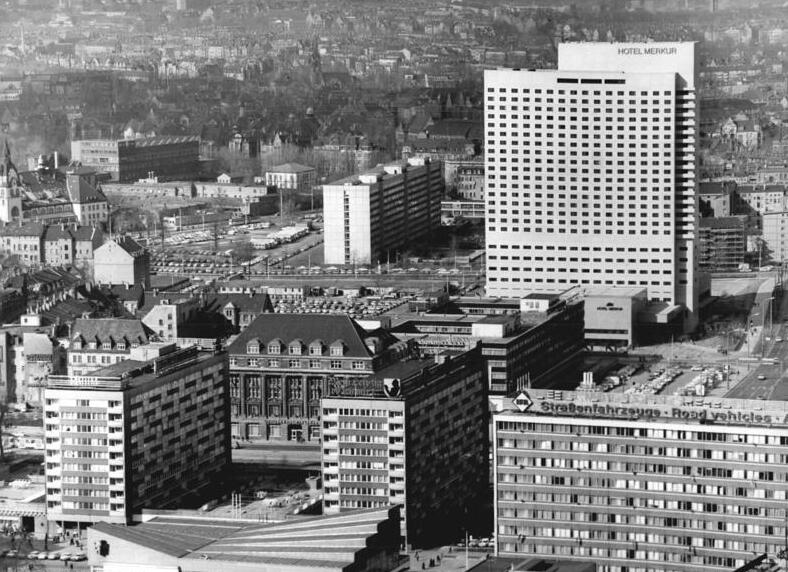
Hotel Merkur (1981)

=== Hotel Merkur ===
The Hotel Merkur opened on 13 March 1981, timed to the opening of the Frühjahrsmesse (Spring Trade Show), In addition to ministers and state secretaries of the GDR, about 100 representatives of Japanese business were present.

The construction company (shell construction) was Dyckerhoff & Widmann AG (DYWIDAG Berlin/West branch), which also had the precast concrete parts delivered from West Berlin. The elevators were installed by a Japanese company. AB Svenska Fläktfabriken from Sweden handled the heating, air conditioning and plumbing. East German companies were involved in the construction, from the interior fittings to the flat roof sealing (VEB Spezialbau Magdeburg) and plumbing (sheet metal work).

When it opened, the Hotel Merkur had 447 air-conditioned rooms and apartments with 700 beds, twelve restaurants, bars and clubs with a total of 800 seats – including Sakura, the second Japanese restaurant in the GDR after a restaurant in Suhl – as well as five salons and a 265-seat banquet and convention center. The hotel employed 740 people, including 110 at the Intershop. The hotel had 15 in-house vehicles from the Wartburg, Lada and Volvo brands. The hotel also had its own passport and visa office.

In January 1987 the 15th Congress of Internists met in the hotel, in April the International Congress of the Anatomical Society; in September of the same year, the 23rd anniversary of the European Association for the Study of Diabetes. On 8 March 1990, Leipzig's first casino opened in the hotel. In the top ten list of the Allgemeine Hotel- und Gastronomie-Zeitung (AHGZ) in 1991, the Hotel Merkur was ranked 8th among the best hotels in Germany.

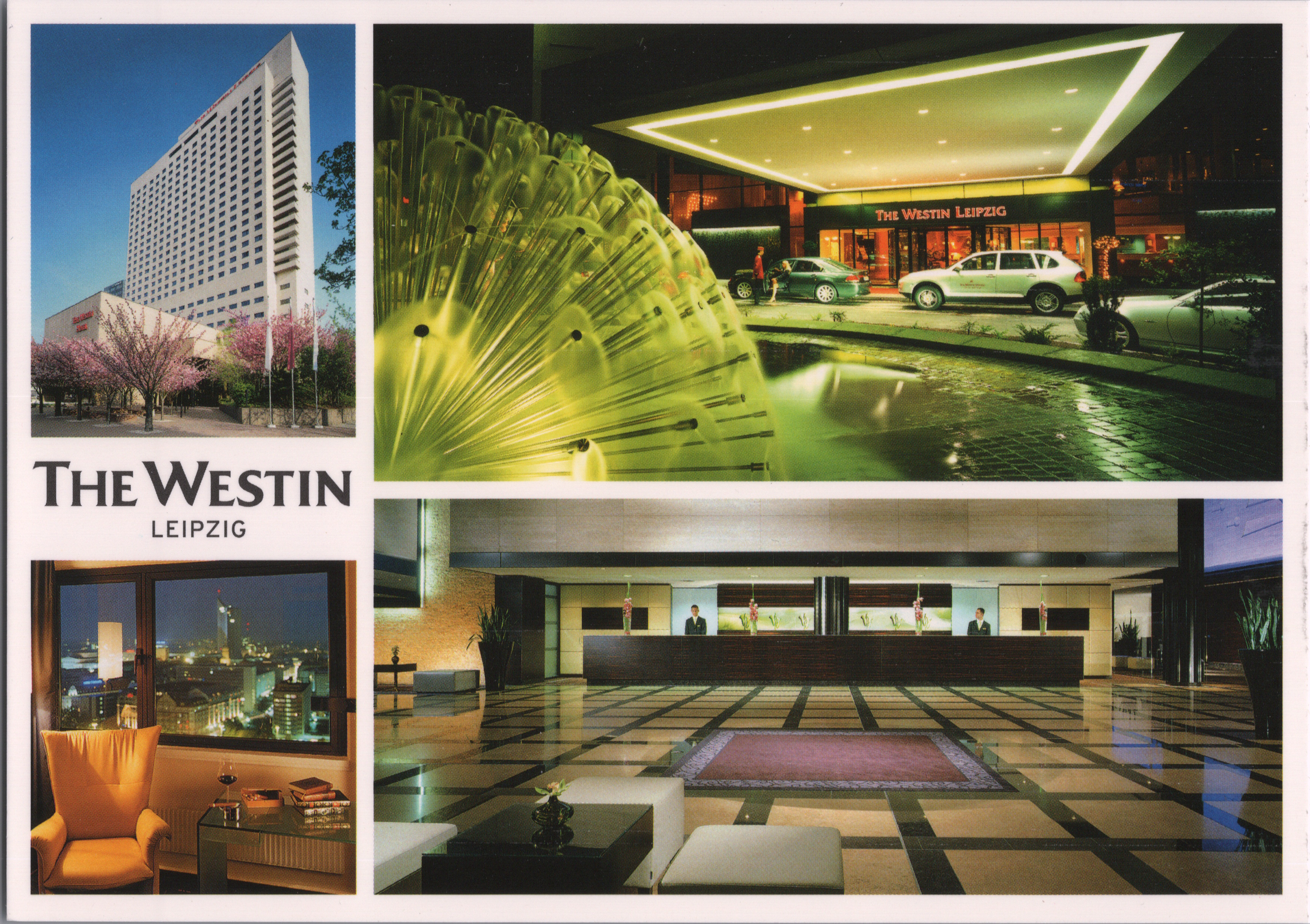
Postcard (2008)

The Treuhandanstalt initially continued to run the Interhotels, but later sold it to investors.

=== Inter-Continental Leipzig ===
On 1 January 1993, the Hotel Merkur became the Hotel Inter-Continental Leipzig, managed by Inter-Continental Hotels. Between 1993 and 1994, a total of 43 million DM was invested in the renovation and conversion of the house. On the occasion of the 50th anniversary of Inter-Continental Hotels & Resorts, the hotel initiated the environmental and benefit campaign "One Day for Leipzig" in 1996.

=== The Westin Leipzig ===
At the end of 2002, Westin Hotels & Resorts assumed management of the four-star hotel and it was renamed The Westin Leipzig on 1 January 2003.

On 28 April 2005, the Falco restaurant opened on the 27th floor under the direction of Peter Maria Schnurr. In 2007 the gourmet restaurant received its first Michelin star and in 2008 the Falco received its second Michelin star. It was the first restaurant in the new federal states with two Michelin stars. In November 2023, the restaurant closed forever because it was no longer viable due to a lack of skilled workers and immensely increased costs.

On the occasion of the hotel's 30th anniversary (2011), Bild published details from the Stasi file of the Hotel Merkur with "personal records of sex for sale, clumsy spies and hotel employees who even betrayed their own colleagues".

==== Gil Ofarim incident ====
In October 2021, the hotel received extensive negative media coverage, after singer Gil Ofarim claimed to have received antisemitic treatment from a receptionist, because of his Star of David necklace. The employee filed a defamation complaint against Ofarim and a threatening complaint based on social media posts. The hotel initially put two employees on leave and hired a law firm to investigate. This found no evidence justifying criminal or labor law measures against the employees. The case was submitted to the public prosecutor's office for legal review. According to media reports, no chain with a visible Star of David could be identified on the surveillance videos of the hotel. After the investigation was completed, the public prosecutor's office in Leipzig dropped the case against the hotel employee and brought charges of defamation and false suspicion against Ofarim. The trial against Ofarim began on 7 November 2023, with ten trial days scheduled. Ofarim admitted during the trial that he had lied and fabricated the incident. He apologized to the hotel's manager and was ordered to pay a fine of €10,000 to the Jewish community of Leipzig and the House of the Wannsee Conference, a Holocaust museum in Berlin. Ofarim was condemned by the Central Council of Jews in Germany, which said he had done "great damage to the victims of genuine antisemitism."

== Awards ==
- 2007 Restaurant of the Year for the Falco
- 2007 first Michelin star for the Falco
- 2008 second Michelin star for the Falco

== See also ==
- List of tallest buildings in Leipzig

== Literature ==
- Wolfgang Hocquél, Leipzig. Architektur von der Romanik bis zur Gegenwart, 2. stark erweiterte Auflage, Passage Verlag, Leipzig 2004, ISBN 3-932900-54-5, p. 173f.
- Annette Menting, Leipzig. Architektur und Kunst, Reclams Städteführer, Reclam-Verlag, Ditzingen 2022, ISBN 978-3-15-014310-0, p. 102f.
