= Westin Seattle =

Twin-tower highrise hotel in Seattle, Washington

The Westin Seattle

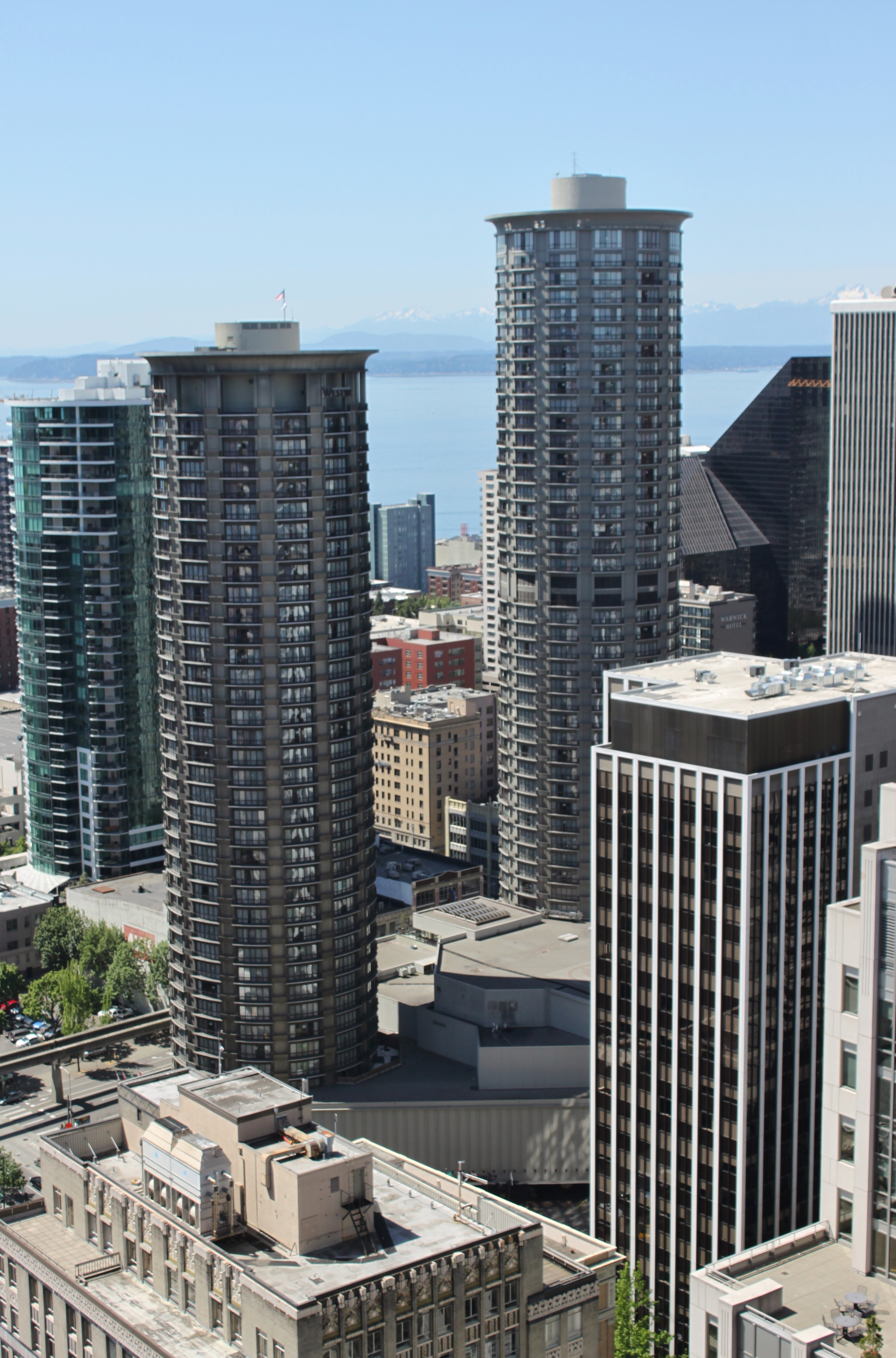
- Original 1969 tower on the left, taller 1982 tower on the right

- Location within Downtown Seattle
- Hotel chain: Westin Hotels

General information
- Location: United States, 1900 Fifth Avenue; Seattle, Washington
- Coordinates: 47.613516°N 122.338225°W
- Opening: North Tower: 1982; South Tower: 1969
- Owner: Host Hotels & Resorts
- Operator: Marriott International

Height
- Height: North Tower: 137 m (449 ft); South Tower: 121 m (397 ft)

Technical details
- Floor count: North Tower: 47; South tower: 40

Design and construction
- Architect: John Graham & Associates
- Developer: Western International Hotels, Alcoa

Other information
- Number of rooms: 891
- Number of suites: 1 Presidential Suite; 8 Luxury Suites; 6 Deluxe Suites; 20 Executive Suites
- Number of restaurants: Relish Burger Bistro; Lobby Bar

The Westin Seattle is an upscale highrise twin-tower hotel in downtown Seattle, Washington. Opened in 1969, it is the flagship property of the Westin Hotels & Resorts brand, owned by Marriott International.

== History ==
On December 28, 1966, Western International Hotels and Alcoa jointly announced the development of the $18 million Washington Plaza Hotel, to be built on the site of the historic Orpheum Theatre. It would be the first new large-scale hotel constructed in Seattle since the adjacent Benjamin Franklin Hotel was built in 1929. Western International President Edward E. Carlson selected the local architecture firm of John Graham & Associates to design the hotel, and the local Howard S. Wright Construction Company to build it. The two firms had also designed and constructed the Space Needle six years earlier, whose construction was first proposed by Carlson and whose restaurant was operated by Western International from 1962–1982.

The Orpheum Theatre was demolished beginning in August 1967. The hotel originally consisted of a single 40 story tower, today's south tower, reaching a height of 121 m (397 ft). The tower was topped out in January 1969 and the hotel opened on June 29, 1969. Western International Hotels operated the Washington Plaza as one property with the now-connected Benjamin Franklin Hotel. Together, the hotel complex had 715 rooms.

The aging Benjamin Franklin wing was demolished in July 1980 for construction of a second, nearly identical tower. While work on the second tower went on, the company was renamed Westin Hotels. The Washington Plaza was the first property in the chain to be renamed, becoming The Westin Hotel on September 1, 1981. That same year, Westin opened a new corporate headquarters directly across the street in the Westin Building, which shared a parking garage with the hotel. The 137 m (449 ft), 47-story north tower opened in June 1982 and was the tallest hotel in the city until 2018 when the Hyatt Regency opened. In 1997, alternative rock band Modest Mouse released an album which featured the towers on the cover. The Westin Seattle is the flagship property of Marriott’s premium upscale Westin brand of hotels and resorts.

Host Hotels & Resorts bought the hotel in 2006. In November 2026, the hotel's sale to Los Angeles-based Ascendant Capital Partners was announced. Effective January 26, 2027, HEI Hotels & Resorts, will assume operation from Marriott.
