= Westin Hotels & Resorts =

American upscale hotel chain owned by Marriott International

- Type: Subsidiary
- Industry: Hospitality
- Founded: 1930; 96 years ago
- Founder: Severt W. Thurston, Frank Dupar
- Headquarters: Bethesda, Maryland, United States
- Number of locations: 250 (March 2025)
- Area served: Worldwide
- Products: Hotels
- Parent: Marriott International
- Subsidiaries: Element by Westin
- Website: westin.marriott.com

Westin Hotels & Resorts is an American upscale hotel chain owned by Marriott International. As of June 30, 2020, the Westin Brand has 226 properties with 82,608 rooms in multiple countries in addition to 58 hotels with 15,741 rooms in the pipeline.

== History ==
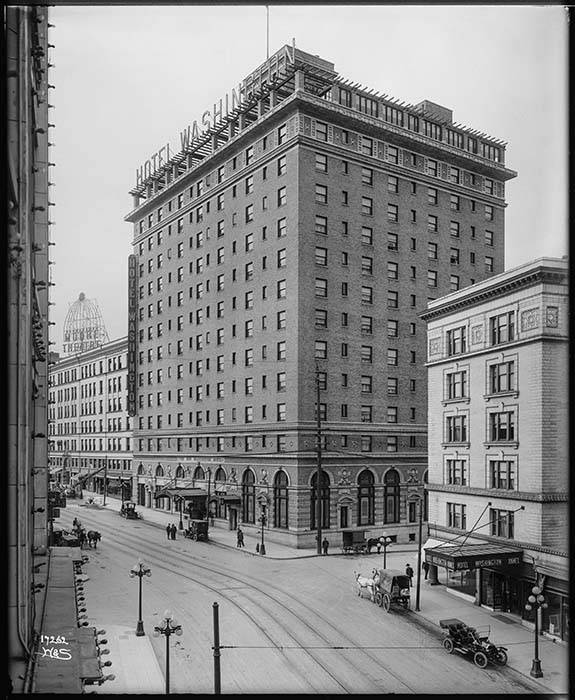
The New Washington Hotel in Seattle

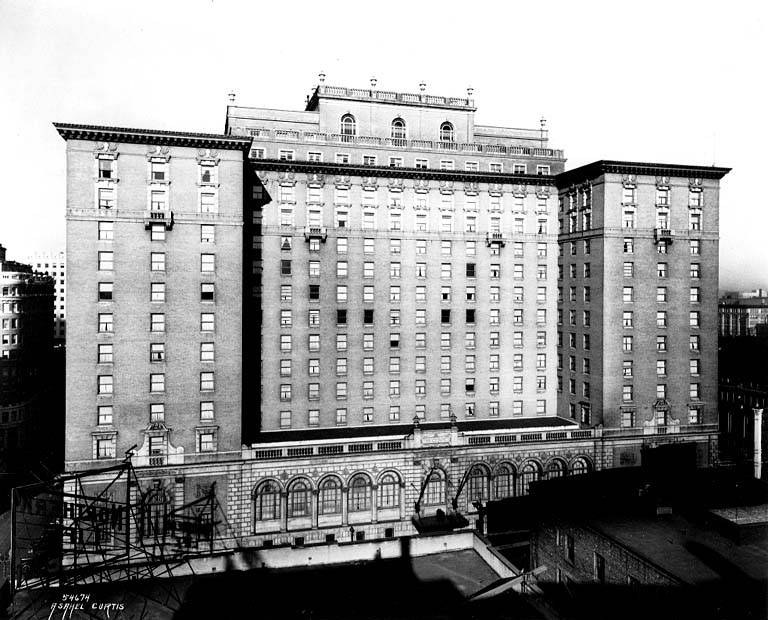
The Olympic Hotel in Seattle

=== Western Hotels ===
In 1930, Severt W. Thurston and Frank Dupar of Seattle, Washington, met unexpectedly during breakfast at the coffee shop of the Commercial Hotel in Yakima, Washington. The competing hotel owners decided to form a management company to handle all their properties, and help deal with the crippling effects of the ongoing Great Depression. The men invited Peter and Adolph Schmidt, who operated five hotels in the Puget Sound area, to join them, and together they established Western Hotels. The chain consisted of 17 properties – 16 in Washington and one in Boise, Idaho.

Western Hotels expanded to Vancouver, British Columbia, and Portland, Oregon, in 1931, to Alaska in 1939, and then to California in 1941, assuming management of the Sir Francis Drake Hotel the day after Pearl Harbor was bombed. Western added properties in Utah in 1949 and Montana in 1950.

Western Hotels executive Edward Carlson convinced Victor "Trader Vic" Bergeron to open his first franchised Trader Vic's location in the chain's Benjamin Franklin Hotel in Seattle in 1949. Originally a small bar named The Outrigger, it was expanded into a full restaurant in 1954 and renamed Trader Vic's in 1960. Due to the restaurant's success, Bergeron worked with Western Hotels to open Trader Vic's locations in a number of its hotels.

In 1955, Western Hotels assumed management of the landmark Olympic Hotel in Seattle. It became the chain's new flagship, and the headquarters and executive offices were moved from the New Washington Hotel to a newly-decorated suite of offices on the 12th floor of the Olympic, in celebration of the chain's 25th anniversary. Western Hotels expanded to Hawaii in 1956, assuming management of the Hawaiian Village Hotel, built by Henry J. Kaiser.

Early management developed each property individually. After more than two decades of rapid growth, many of its properties were merged into a single corporate structure in 1958, focusing on bringing the hotels together under a common chain identity. Also in 1958, Western Hotels assumed management of three hotels in Guatemala, its first properties outside the US and Canada. Western opened its first hotel in Mexico in 1961. In March of that same year, they opened the first hotel to be both constructed and owned by the chain, The Bayshore Inn in Vancouver.

Edward Carlson became President of the chain in 1960 and is credited with bringing the Century 21 Exposition to Seattle in 1962. Carlson's own napkin sketch of a tower with a revolving restaurant on top, inspired by his visit to the Stuttgart TV Tower, was the origin of the Space Needle. The chain managed the restaurant atop the Space Needle from its opening until 1982. Western Hotels also managed a floating hotel aboard the ocean liner QSMV Dominion Monarch, docked in Seattle harbor during the fair.

=== Western International Hotels ===
The company was renamed Western International Hotels in January 1963, to reflect its growth outside the US. In the mid-1960s, the company became publicly-held, trading its shares on the American Stock Exchange.

From November 1, 1965, to 1970, Western International had an agreement with Hotel Corporation of America (today known as Sonesta), under which all 72 hotels of the two chains were jointly marketed as HCA and Western Hotels. From 1968 to 1973, Western International had a similar joint marketing agreement with UK-based Trust House Hotels. In 1970, Western International was acquired by UAL Corporation, with Edward Carlson becoming president and CEO of UAL, Inc and United Airlines.

Western International bought New York's iconic Plaza Hotel in 1975 for $25 million.

=== Westin Hotels ===
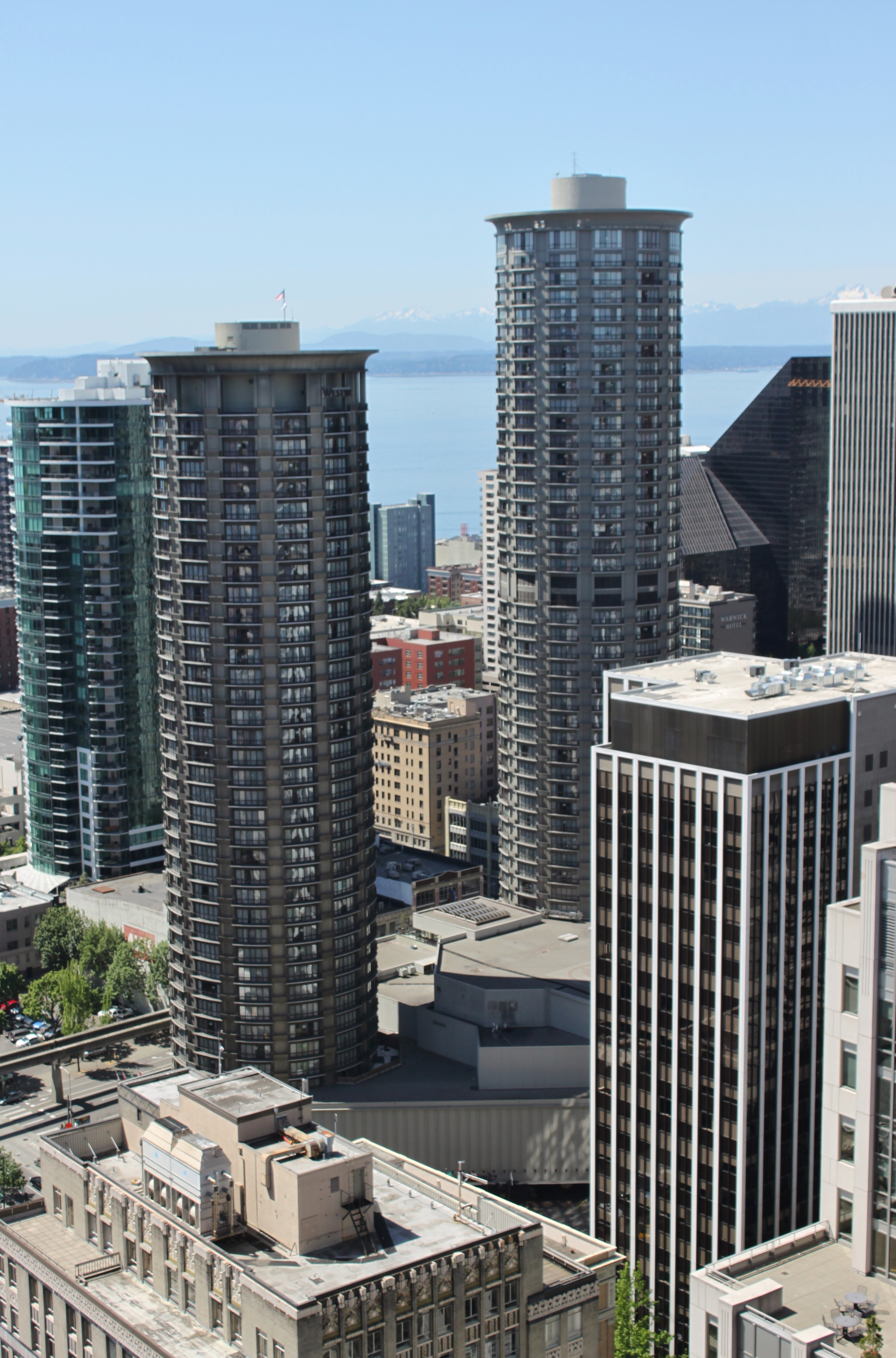
The Westin Seattle opened in 1969 as the Washington Plaza Hotel and was the first property to be branded Westin.

On January 5, 1981, the company changed its name again to Westin Hotels (a contraction of the words Western International). The chain's flagship Washington Plaza Hotel in Seattle was the first property to be rebranded, becoming The Westin Hotel on September 1, 1981. That same year, Westin opened a new corporate headquarters directly across the street in the Westin Building, which shared a parking garage with the hotel.

In 1987, UAL chairman Richard Ferris announced a plan to reorganize UAL as Allegis Corporation, a travel conglomerate based around United Airlines, Hertz Rent a Car, Hilton International Hotels, and Westin and linked by the Apollo computer reservation system. This strategy failed, however, and Allegis sold Westin in 1988 to the Japanese Aoki Corporation for $1.35 billion. Aoki immediately sold the Plaza Hotel to Donald Trump for $390 million.

In 1994, Aoki agreed to sell Westin to real estate investment firm Starwood Capital Group and Goldman Sachs at an enormous loss, for $561 million, but by the time the sale closed in May 1995, the buyers had negotiated the price down to $537 million. In 1998, Starwood assumed full ownership of the company.

In 2016, Marriott International acquired Starwood Hotels and Resorts, becoming the world's largest hotel company.

== Amenities ==
Westin was the first hotel chain to introduce guest credit cards (in 1946), 24-hour room service (1969), and personal voice mail in each room (1991). In 1999, Westin began selling the Heavenly Bed mattresses featured in Westin properties, and manufactured by Simmons Bedding Company, to the general public. In 2005, Westin partnered with Nordstrom, which carried the mattresses and bedding in its stores. In 2011, Westin began selling the Heavenly mattresses and bedding at Pottery Barn stores.

== Accommodations ==
| | | North America | Europe | Middle E. & Africa | Asia & Pacific | Caribbean Latin Am. | Total |
|---|---|---|---|---|---|---|---|
| 2016 | Properties | 125 | 19 | 9 | 51 | 13 | 217 |
| 2016 | Rooms | 51,705 | 6,241 | 2,934 | 16,299 | 4,070 | 81,249 |
| 2017 | Properties | 128 | 19 | 9 | 53 | 12 | 221 |
| 2017 | Rooms | 52,722 | 6,183 | 2,934 | 16,704 | 3,645 | 82,188 |
| 2018 | Properties | 129 | 19 | 7 | 56 | 12 | 223 |
| 2018 | Rooms | 52,955 | 6,125 | 1,839 | 17,595 | 3,639 | 82,153 |
| 2019 | Properties | 130 | 18 | 7 | 58 | 12 | 225 |
| 2019 | Rooms | 53,097 | 6,024 | 1,839 | 17,872 | 3,640 | 82,472 |
| 2020 | Properties | 130 | 17 | 7 | 58 | 13 | 225 |
| 2020 | Rooms | 52,705 | 5,686 | 1,839 | 17,751 | 3,819 | 81,800 |
| 2021 | Properties | 133 | 18 | 7 | 61 | 13 | 232 |
| 2021 | Rooms | 54,009 | 5,973 | 1,838 | 18,478 | 3,813 | 84,111 |
| 2022 | Properties | 132 | 18 | 8 | 63 | 14 | 235 |
| 2022 | Rooms | 53,756 | 5,968 | 2,030 | 19,450 | 3,955 | 85,159 |
| 2023 | Properties | 134 | 17 | 8 | 69 | 15 | 243 |
| 2023 | Rooms | 54,820 | 5,787 | 2,030 | 21,173 | 4,347 | 88,157 |

== Notable hotels ==
- The Westin Grand Berlin
- The Westin Dhaka
- The Westin Seattle
- The Westin Zagreb
- The Westin Charlotte
- The Westin Leipzig
- The Westin New York Grand Central Hotel
- The Westin Bonaventure Hotel & Suites Los Angeles
- Moana Surfrider, A Westin Resort & Spa
- The Westin Peachtree Plaza Atlanta
- The Westin Book Cadillac Detroit
- The Westin Nova Scotian – Halifax, Nova Scotia
- The Westin St. Francis
- The Westin Excelsior, Rome
- The Westin San Jose
- The Westin Portland Harborview
- Walt Disney World Swan
- Westin Virginia Beach Town Center
