= Palasthotel =

Former hotel in Berlin, Germany

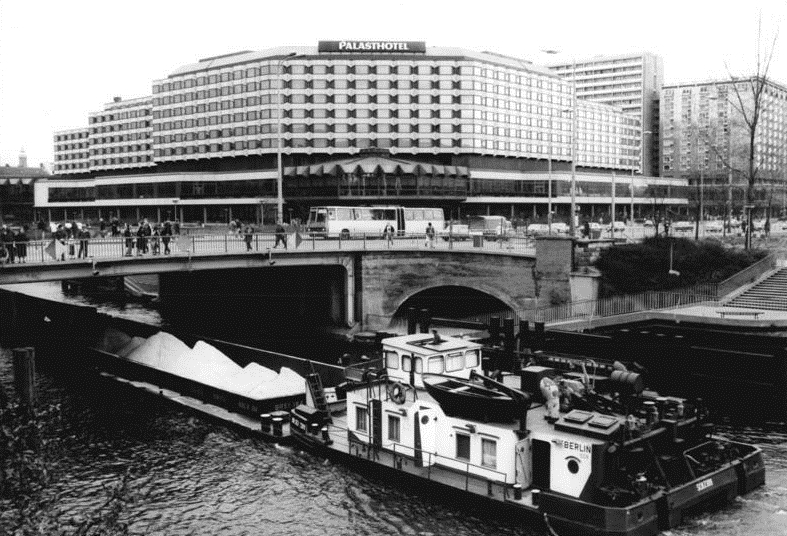
Palasthotel in 1985

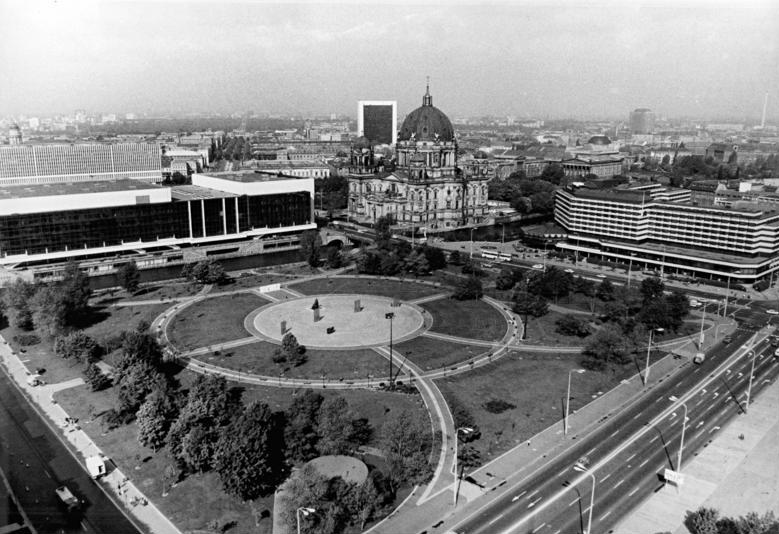
Palasthotel to the right, Marx-Engels-Forum and Palast der Republik to the left, Berliner Dom in the middle

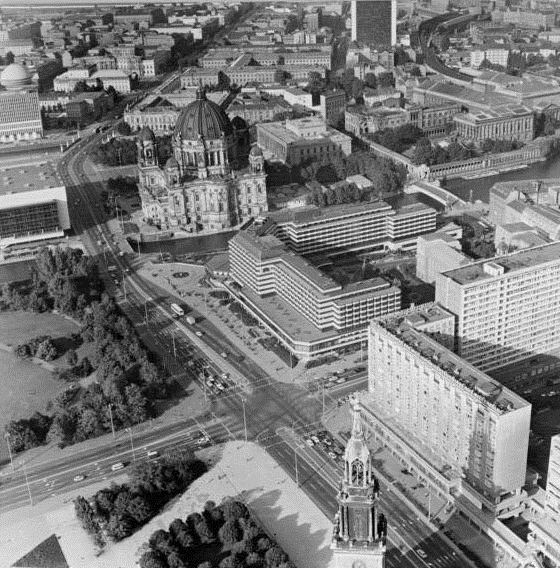
Palasthotel in the middle

Palasthotel (English: Palace Hotel) was a hotel that belonged to the Interhotel chain and was located at Karl-Liebknecht-Straße 5 in the Mitte district of Berlin, behind the Berliner Dom and along the river Spree. It was built between 1976 and 1979 on a design by Ferenc Kiss. The hotel had 600 rooms with 1,000 beds and a conference hall with about 2,000 seats. It was closed to all East German guests, as one had to pay in hard currency instead of the local East German mark. Between 1990 and 1992 the hotel was owned by Interhotel AG, and in 1992 the hotel was renamed the Radisson SAS Berlin. It closed on 1 December 2000 due to Asbestos that was used in its construction, and was eventually demolished in 2001 to make room for the new DomAquarée, which houses a hotel of the Radisson Blu group and was opened in 2003.

The hotel should not be confused with the original Palast Hotel built between 1892 and 1893 by Ludwig Heim at Leipziger Platz, which was destroyed during the second World War.

== Miscellaneous ==
- The Palasthotel was an important part of the Stasi surveillance of all foreigners that entered the GDR. At all times there were four Stasi officers employed in monitoring the hotel. Using cameras and microphones they kept the reception hall, elevators, corridors and several rooms under strict surveillance. 25-30 rooms in the hotel were thusly equipped so that such monitoring of especially “interesting” guests could take place. Video and tape recorders were placed in the so-called “Stasi Suite,” room 51.01/51.03 on the fifth floor.
- On the eight floor, room 80.26/80.27, was the office of Herbert Rübler. From here he carried out his work of organizing commerce between the DDR and the west. He was found dead in the same hotel in May 1989.
- It was referred to as "Valuta-hotel" and “Stasi-nest.”
- It was used by the leading figures in the SED and for receiving distinguished guests from abroad.
- Famous guests include: Karl-Eduard von Schnitzler, Alexander Schalck-Golodkowski, Udo Lindenberg, U2, Bruce Springsteen, Katja Epstein and British rock band Barclay James Harvest when they performed their “Glasnost” concert at Treptower Park in East Berlin on 14 July 1987.
- The hotel plays an important part in the German novel “Wie es leuchtet” (Fischer 2004) by Thomas Brussig.
- The Palasthotel is referenced in the U2 documentary “From The Sky Down.” The band stayed in the hotel during the recording of Achtung Baby in late 1990. Bono described the hotel as a “festival of brown … meaning everything in the hotel was brown. Brown carpet, brown knobs on the stereo. But I was looking out on a beautiful cathedral, that was nice. From the brown room, in the brown hotel.”

== Literature ==
- Anne Holper, Matthias Käther, DDR-Baudenkmale in Berlin-Berlins Osten neu entdeckt, 2003.
- Kristie Macrakis, Seduced by Secrets: Inside the Stasi's Spy-Tech World, Cambridge University Press; 1 edition (21 March 2008).
