= Interhotel =

East German luxury hotel chain

- Industry: Hotels
- Founded: 1965
- Defunct: 2006
- Number of locations: 37
- Area served: East Germany (prior to reunification)
- Services: Lodging, dining
- Owner: Free German Trade Union Federation

Interhotel was an East German hotel chain founded in 1965.

Originally, the hotel chain consisted of a hotel each in Berlin, Erfurt, Jena and Magdeburg, two hotels in Chemnitz (then Karl-Marx-Stadt) and five hotels in Leipzig.

5-star hotels were exclusively reserved for guests from non-socialist states who booked their tours through the Intertourist travel agency and flew into East Germany via Interflug airlines. They were also allowed to shop at Intershop stores because East Germany needed hard currency from the West. 4-star hotels were mainly for guests from Comecon countries, for example, the HotelStadt Berlin was built for Soviet guests. There were also some 3-star hotels in smaller towns, such as Hotel Elephant in Weimar.

Practically all luxury hotels in East Germany were part of the Interhotel chain, notable exceptions being the Neptun hotel in Warnemünde and Cecilienhof castle in Potsdam. The Verband Deutscher Konsumgenossenschaften (VDK), the union of consumer co-operatives in the GDR also ran hotels, mainly three and four-star hotels such as the Konsum Erholungsheim in Oberhof, which is still part of what remains of the co-operative movement in Germany.

After German reunification, most of the hotels were still run by Interhotel AG. In 1991, some hotels were sold to the Klingbeil group, and in December 2006 some were sold to the Blackstone Group.

The Interhotel hotels were under the control of the East German state security service, the Stasi, under the Tourist Department. The Stasi tried to monitor the activities of international tourists, by sending prostitutes to audio- and video-controlled hotel rooms. They focused on hotels where political decisions were discussed, such as Hotel Bellevue in Dresden.

== List of Interhotel hotels ==
=== Berlin ===
- Hotel Berolina - Opened 1964, closed 1995, demolished 1996
- Hotel Unter den Linden - Opened 1966, demolished 2006
- Hotel Stadt Berlin - Opened 1970, renamed Forum Hotel Berlin 1993, renamed Park Inn by Radisson Berlin Alexanderplatz 2003
- Hotel Metropol - Opened 1977, renamed Maritim Hotel Metropol 1992, rebuilt and renamed Maritim proArte Hotel Berlin 2000
- Palasthotel - Opened 1979, renamed Radisson SAS Hotel Berlin 1992, closed 2000, demolished 2001 for construction of a new Radisson SAS Hotel Berlin, renamed Radisson Blu Hotel Berlin 2009
- Grand Hotel Berlin - Opened 1987, renamed Maritim Grand Hotel Berlin 1992, renamed The Westin Grand Berlin 1997
- Domhotel - Opened 1990, renamed Hilton Berlin 1991

=== Dresden ===
- Hotel Astoria - Opened 1950, closed 1992, demolished 1998
- Motel Dresden - Opened 1967, renamed Hotel am Bismarckturm 1990, closed and demolished soon after
- Hotel Bastei - Opened May 1969, renamed ibis Dresden Bastei 1992, renamed ibis Dresden Zentrum 2017 in joint operation with the Königstein
- Hotel Königstein - Opened Autumn 1969, renamed ibis Dresden Königstein 1992, renamed ibis Dresden Zentrum 2017 in joint operation with the Bastei
- Hotel Lilienstein - Opened Autumn 1969, renamed ibis Dresden Lilienstein 1992, renamed The Student Hotel Dresden 2018, renamed Dresden Zentrum Hotel 2022, renamed Holiday Inn Express Dresden Zentrum in 2023
- Hotel Newa - Opened 1970, renamed Hotel Mercure Newa Dresden 1992, renamed Hotel Pullman Dresden Newa 2008, renamed Occidental Dresden Newa in 2024, renamed Barceló Dresden Newa in 2026
- Hotel Bellevue - Opened 1985, renamed Maritim Hotel Bellevue 1992, renamed Hotel Bellevue 1996, renamed The Westin Bellevue Dresden 2000, renamed Bilderberg Bellevue Hotel Dresden 2020
- Hotel Dresdner Hof - Opened 1990, renamed Hilton Dresden 1992

=== Erfurt ===
- Hotel Erfurter Hof - Built 1904, opened as an Interhotel in 1965, closed 1995
- Hotel Kosmos - Opened 1980, renamed Radisson SAS Hotel Erfurt 1995, renamed Radisson Blu Hotel Erfurt 2009, renamed NYX Hotel Erfurt 2025

=== Gera ===
- Hotel Gera - Opened 1967, renamed Maritim Hotel Gera 1992, demolished 1997

=== Halle ===
- Hotel Stadt Halle - Opened 1966, renamed Maritim Hotel Halle 1992, converted to refugee housing 2016, closed 2017

=== Jena ===
- Hotel International - Opened 1963, became an Interhotel 1965, demolished 1997

=== Karl-Marx-Stadt ===
- Hotel Chemnitzer Hof - Opened 1930, became an Interhotel 1965, renamed Günnewig Hotel Chemnitzer Hof 1992, renamed Hotel Chemnitzer Hof 2017
- Hotel Moskau - Opened 1962, became an Interhotel 1965, renamed Günnewig Hotel Europa 1992, renamed Hotel an der Oper 2008
- Hotel Kongress - Opened 1974, renamed Mercure Hotel Kongress Chemnitz 1992, renamed Dorint Kongresshotel Chemnitz 2018, renamed Congress Hotel Chemnitz 2024, closed 2026

=== Leipzig ===
- Hotel International - Opened 1890 as Hotel Fürstenhof, renamed Hotel International after WWII, became an Interhotel 1965, closed 1993, reopened as Hotel Fürstenhof Kempinski Leipzig 1996, renamed Hotel Fürstenhof 2000, renamed Lumière Boutiquehotel im Fürstenhof Leipzig 2025
- Hotel Astoria - Opened 1915, became an Interhotel 1965, renamed Maritim Hotel Astoria 1992, closed 1996, interior demolished 2019 only the facade remains
- Hotel Stadt Leipzig - Opened 1964, became an Interhotel 1965, closed 1992 and demolished for construction of Hotel Novotel Leipzig City
- Hotel Deutschland - Opened 1965, renamed Hotel Am Ring 1973, renamed Hotel Deutschland 1990, renamed Hotel Mercure am Augustusplatz 1992, renamed Radisson SAS Hotel Leipzig 2007, renamed Radisson Blu Hotel Leipzig 2009
- Hotel Zum Löwen - Opened 1965, renamed Holiday Inn Garden Court Leipzig City Centre 1995, later renamed Best Western Hotel Leipzig City Center
- Hotel Merkur - Opened 1981, renamed InterContinental Leipzig 1993, renamed The Westin Leipzig 2003

=== Magdeburg ===
- Hotel International - Opened 1963, became an Interhotel 1965, demolished 1993, Maritim Hotel Magdeburg opened on the site 1995

=== Neubrandenburg ===
- Hotel Vier Tore - Opened 1950s, became an Interhotel 1989/90, renamed Radisson SAS Hotel Neubrandenburg, renamed Radisson Blu Hotel Neubrandenburg 2009, demolished 2016

=== Oberhof ===
- Hotel Panorama - Opened 1969, renamed Ramada Treff Hotel Panorama Oberhof, then Treff Hotel Panorama Oberhof, then AHORN Panorama Hotel Oberhof 2018

=== Potsdam ===
- Hotel Potsdam - Opened 1969, renamed Mercure Hotel Potsdam 1992

=== Rostock ===
- Hotel Warnow - Opened 1967, renamed Radisson SAS Hotel Rostock 1992, demolished 2001 for construction of a new Radisson SAS Hotel Rostock which opened in 2005, renamed Radisson Blu Hotel Rostock 2009

=== Suhl ===
- Hotel Thüringen-Tourist - Opened 1968, renamed Hotel Thüringen Suhl, later renamed Michel Hotel Suhl, then ACHAT Hotel Suhl

=== Weimar ===
- Hotel Elephant - Founded 1696, current structure opened 1938, became an Interhotel 1966
- Hotel Belvedere - Opened 1992 as Hilton Weimar, renamed Leonardo Hotel Weimar 2007

== Gallery ==
Interhotel DDR

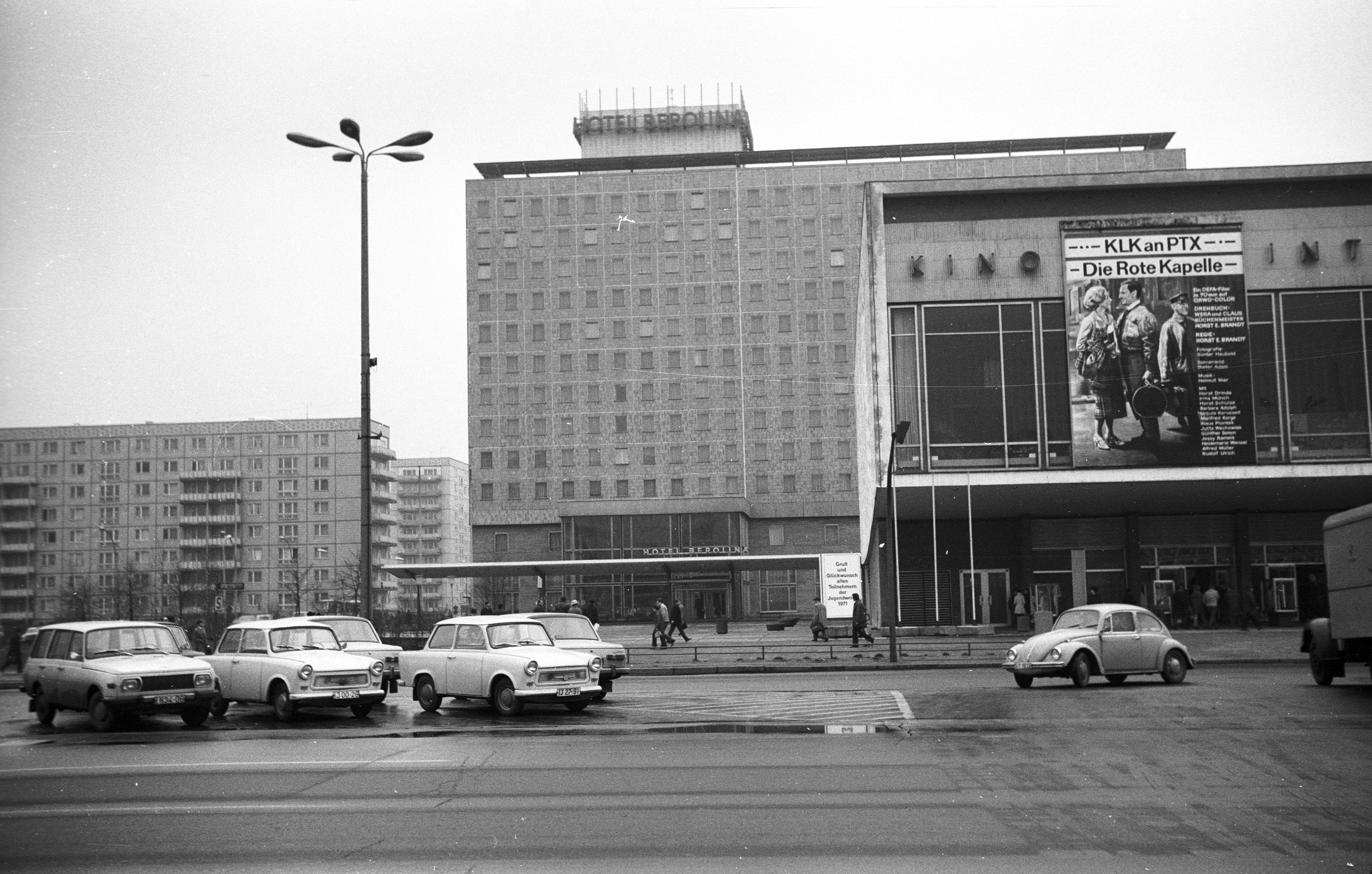
Hotel Berolina, Berlin, 1971

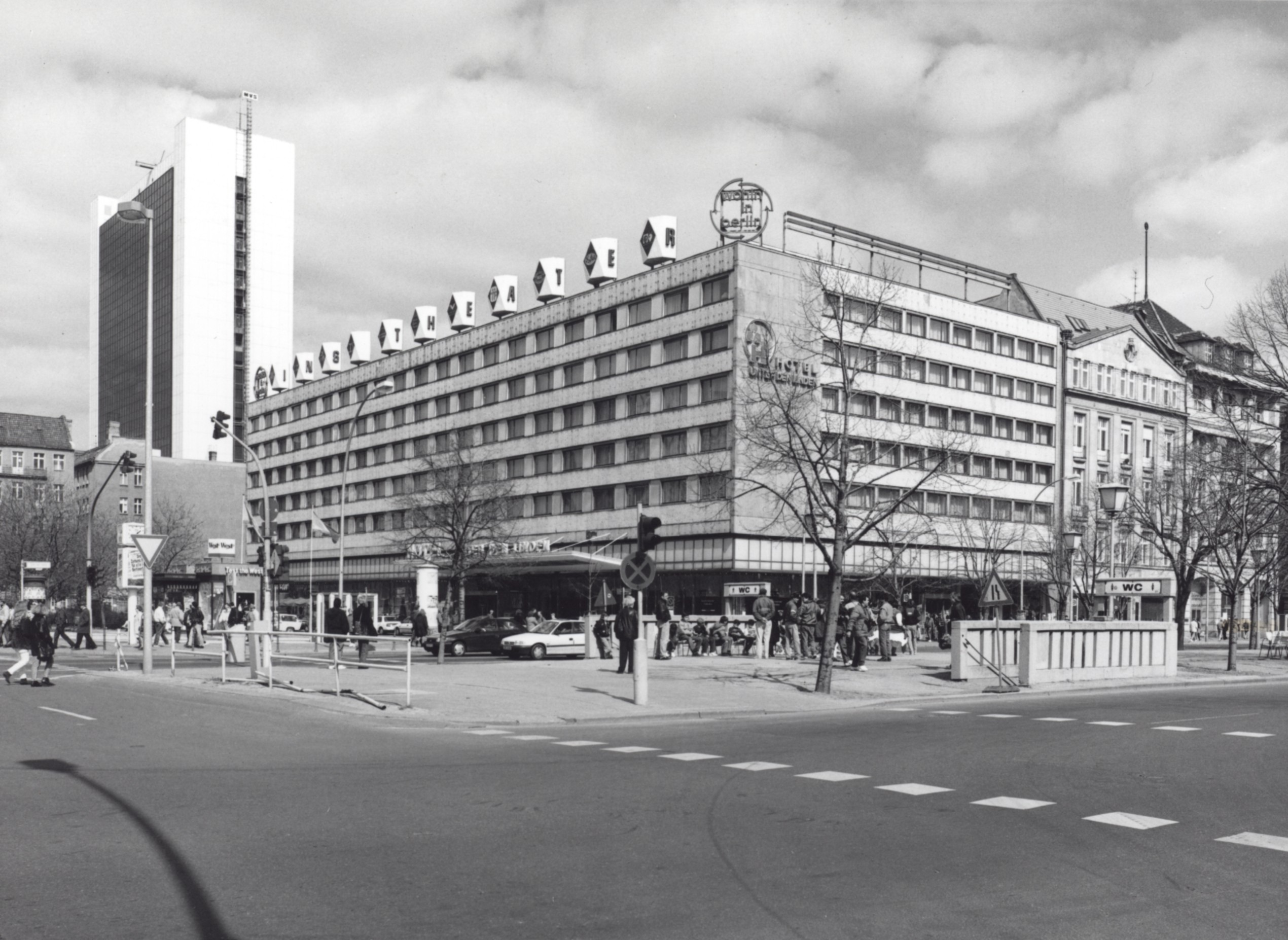
Hotel Unter den Linden, Berlin, 1993

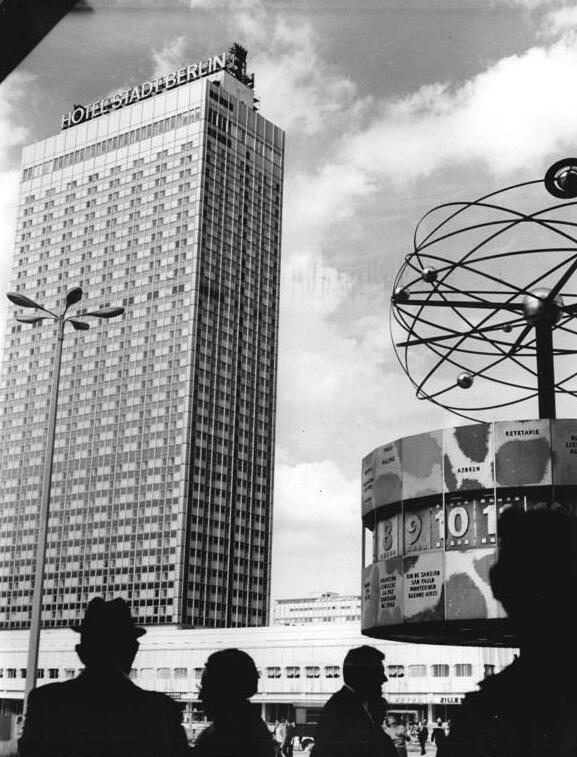
Hotel Stadt Berlin, Berlin, 1970

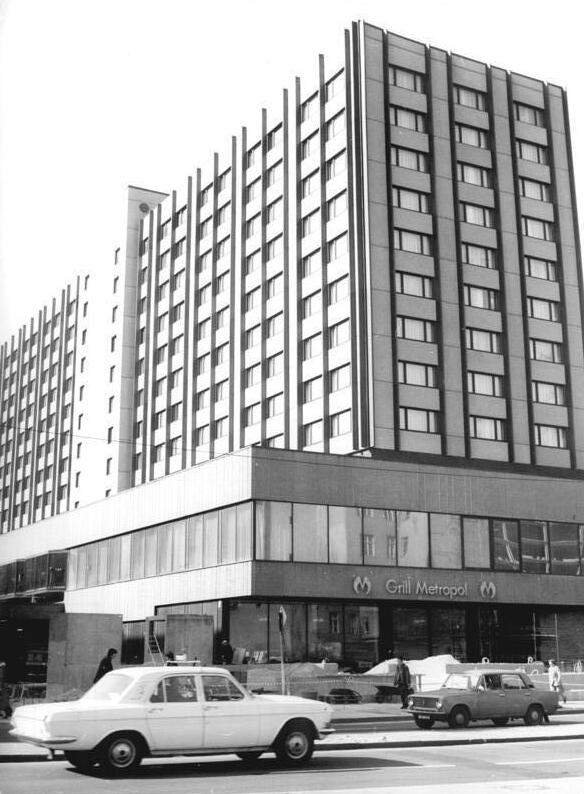
Hotel Metropol, Berlin, 1977

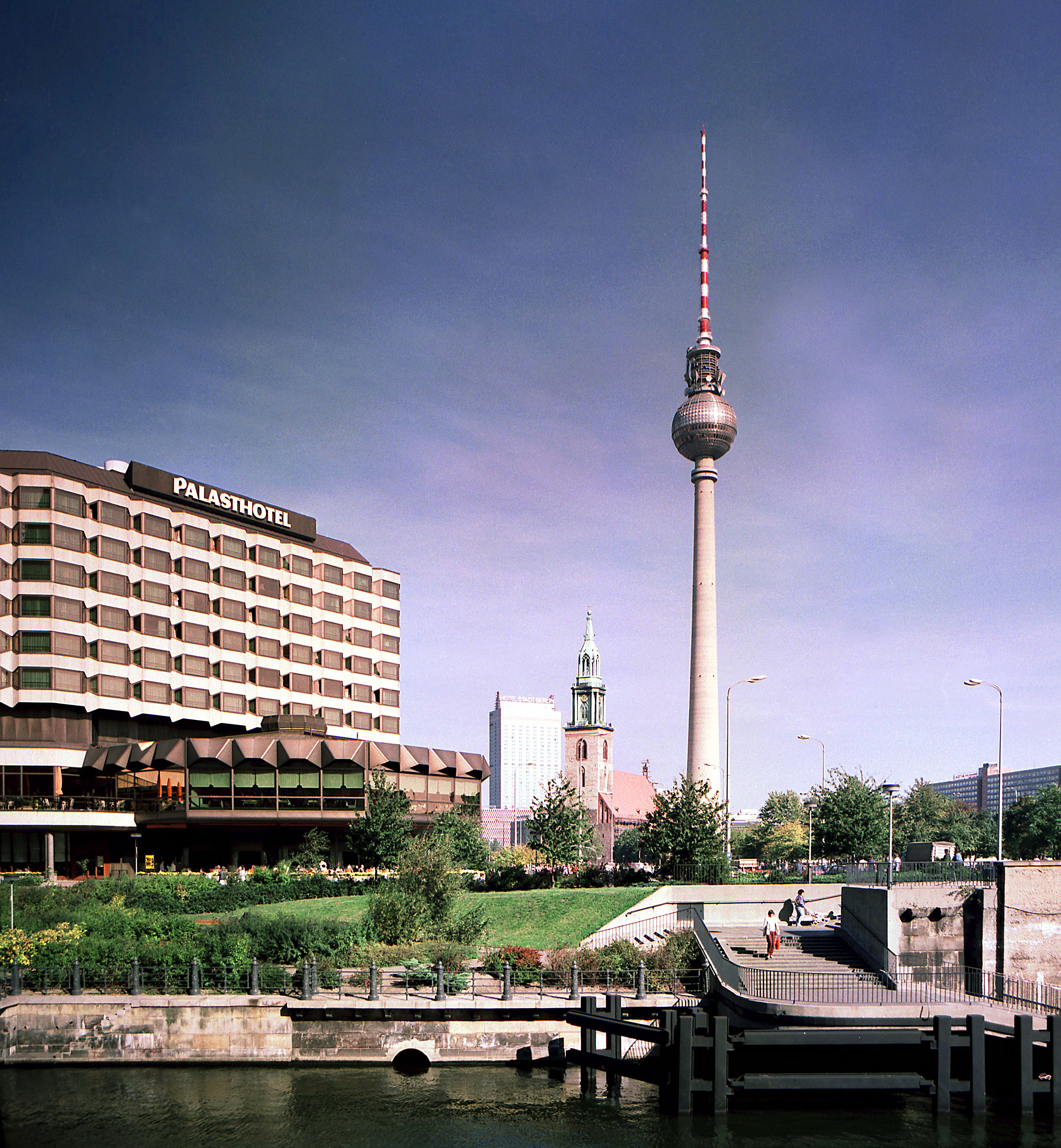
Palasthotel, Berlin, 1986

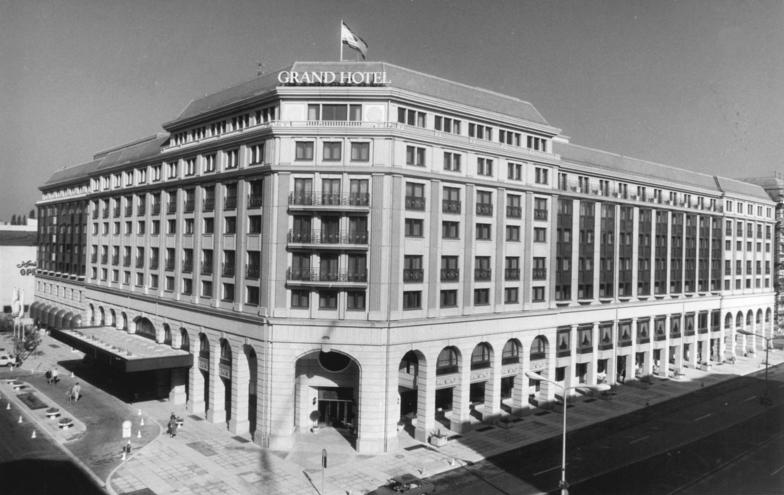
Grand Hotel Berlin, 1987

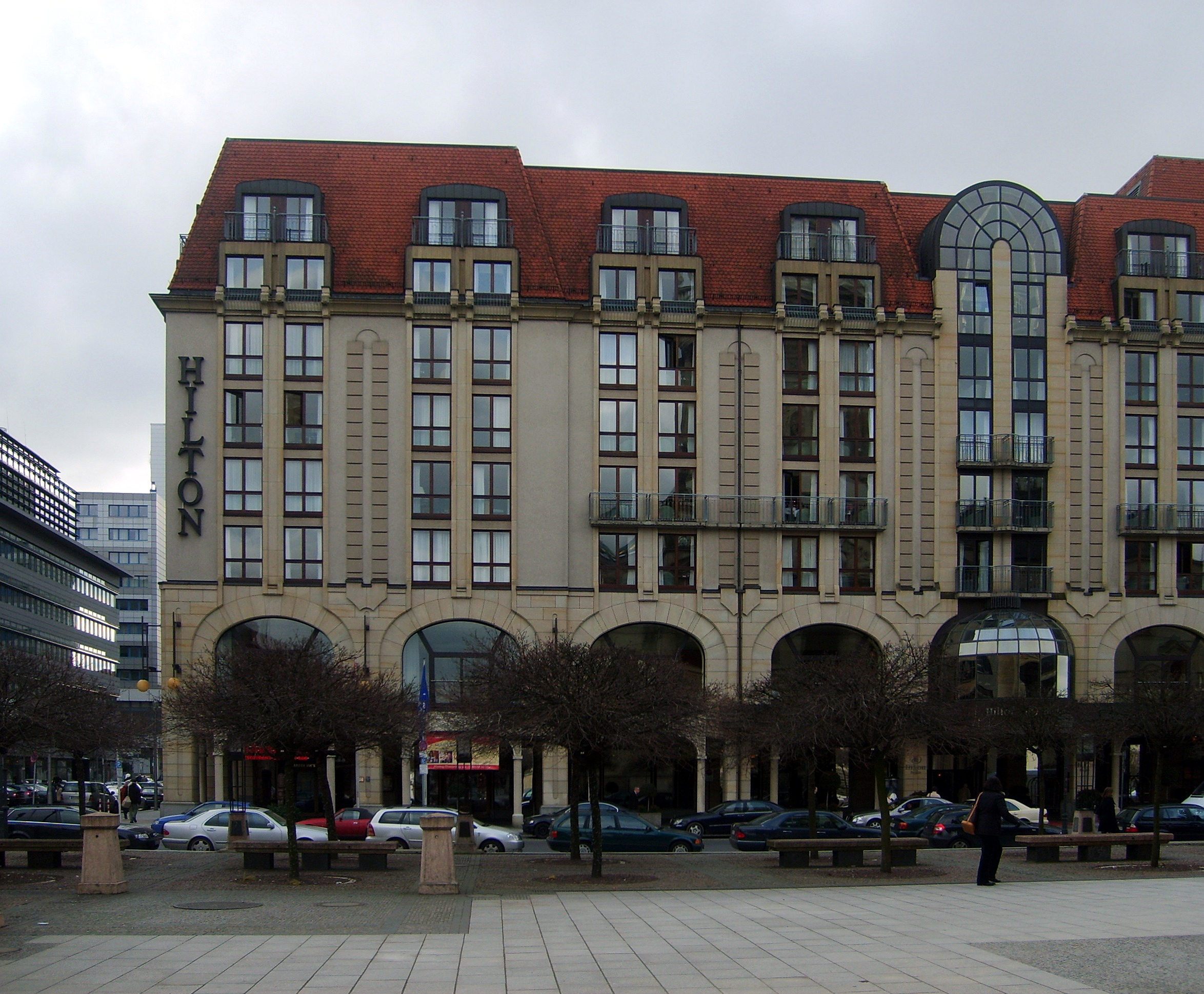
Hilton Berlin (former Domhotel), Berlin, 2007

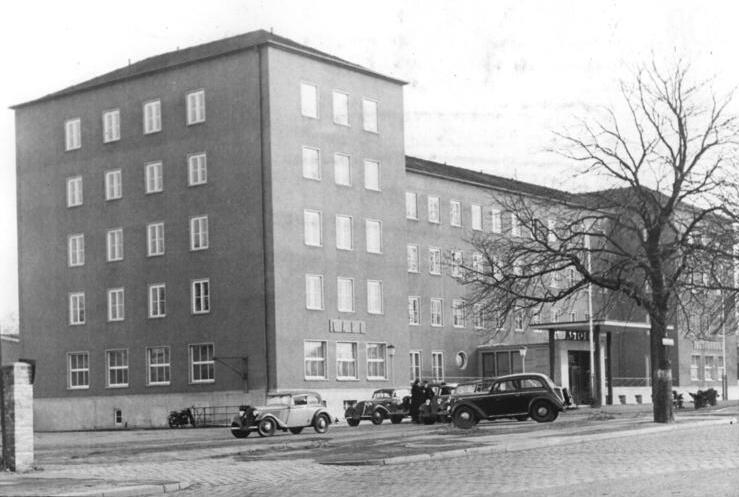
Hotel Astoria, Dresden, 1951

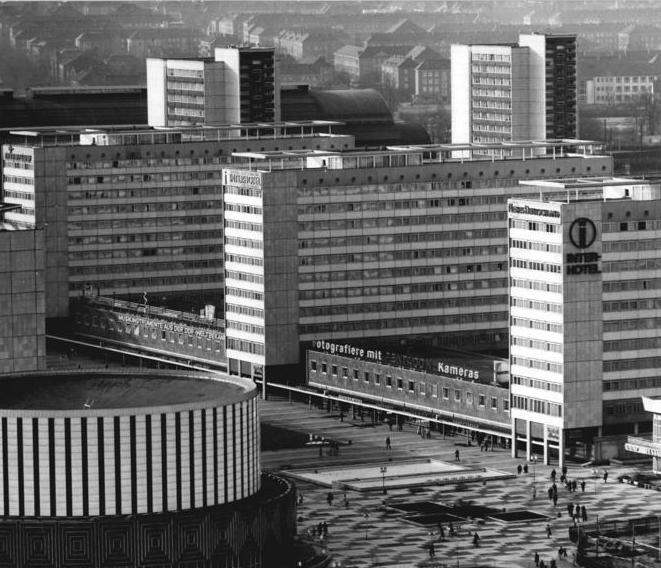
Hotels Bastei, Königstein and Lilienstein, Dresden, 1975

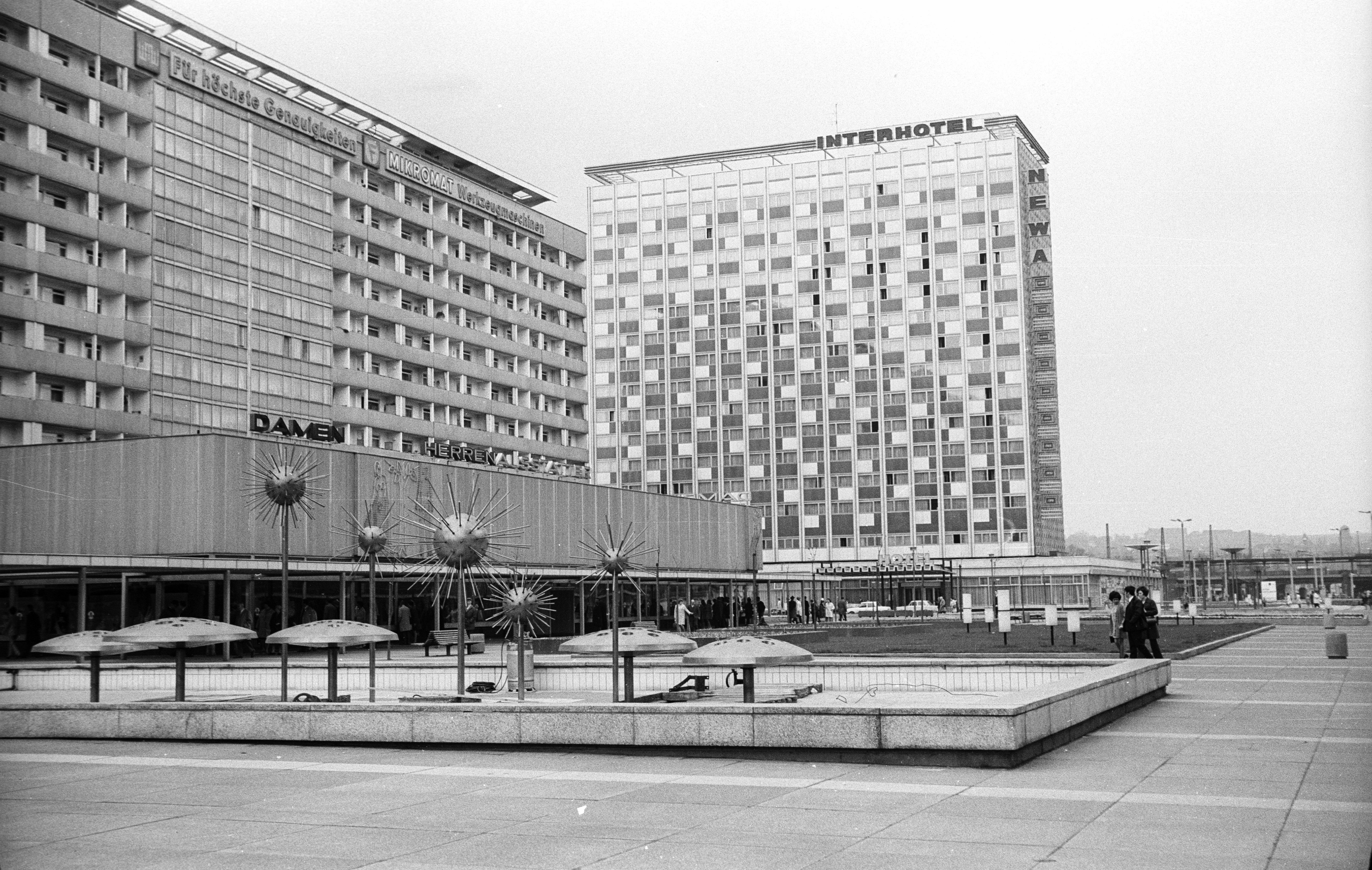
Hotel Newa, Dresden, 1971

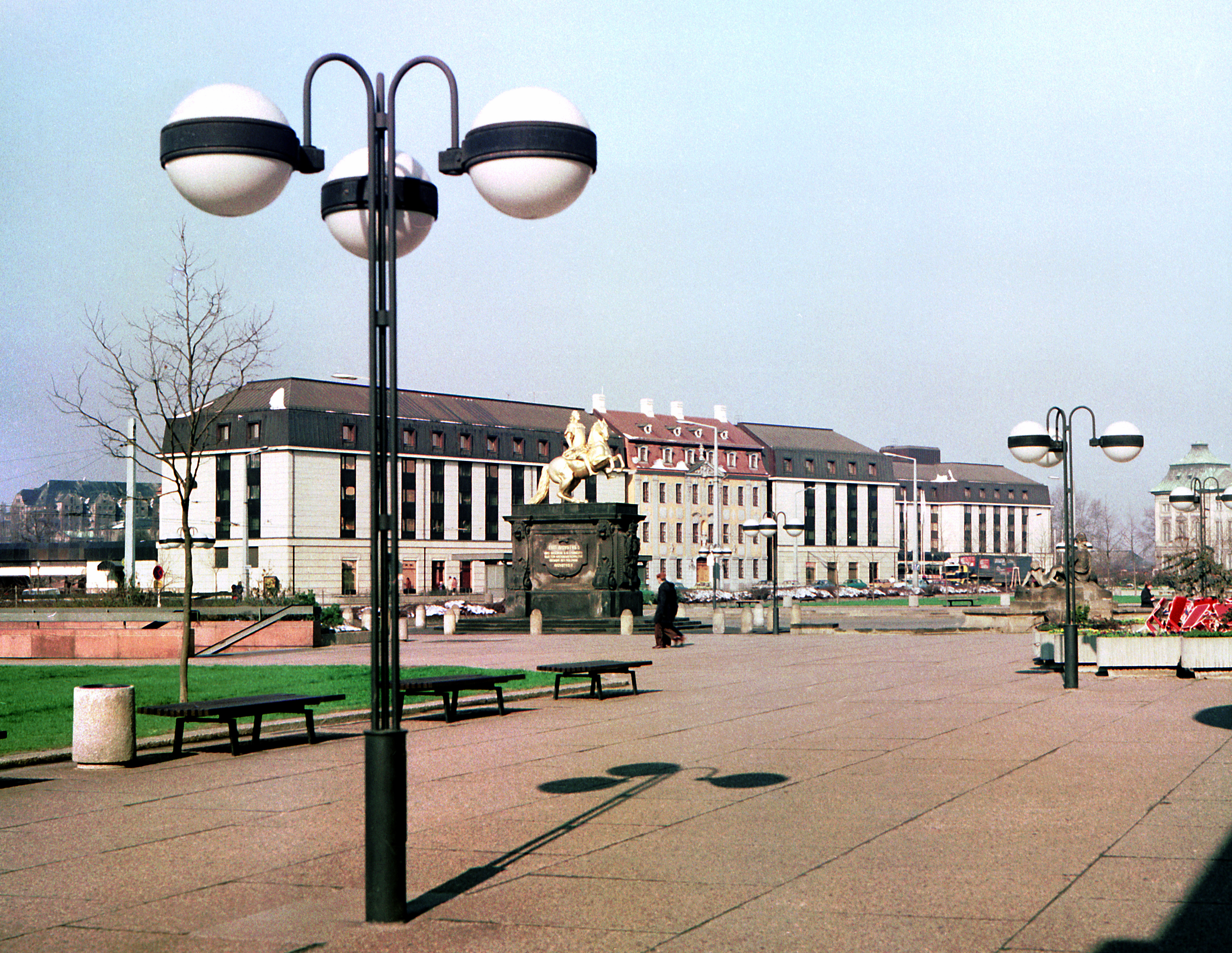
Hotel Bellevue, Dresden, 1986

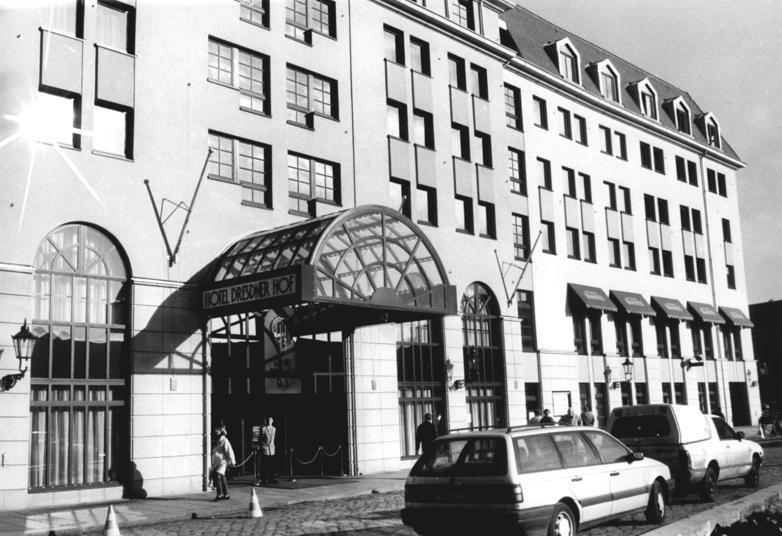
Hotel Dresdner Hof, Dresden, 1990

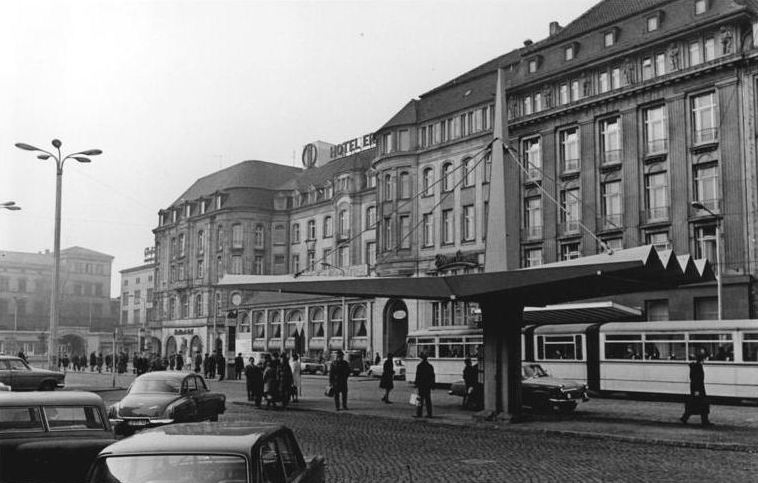
Hotel Erfurter Hof, Erfurt, 1970

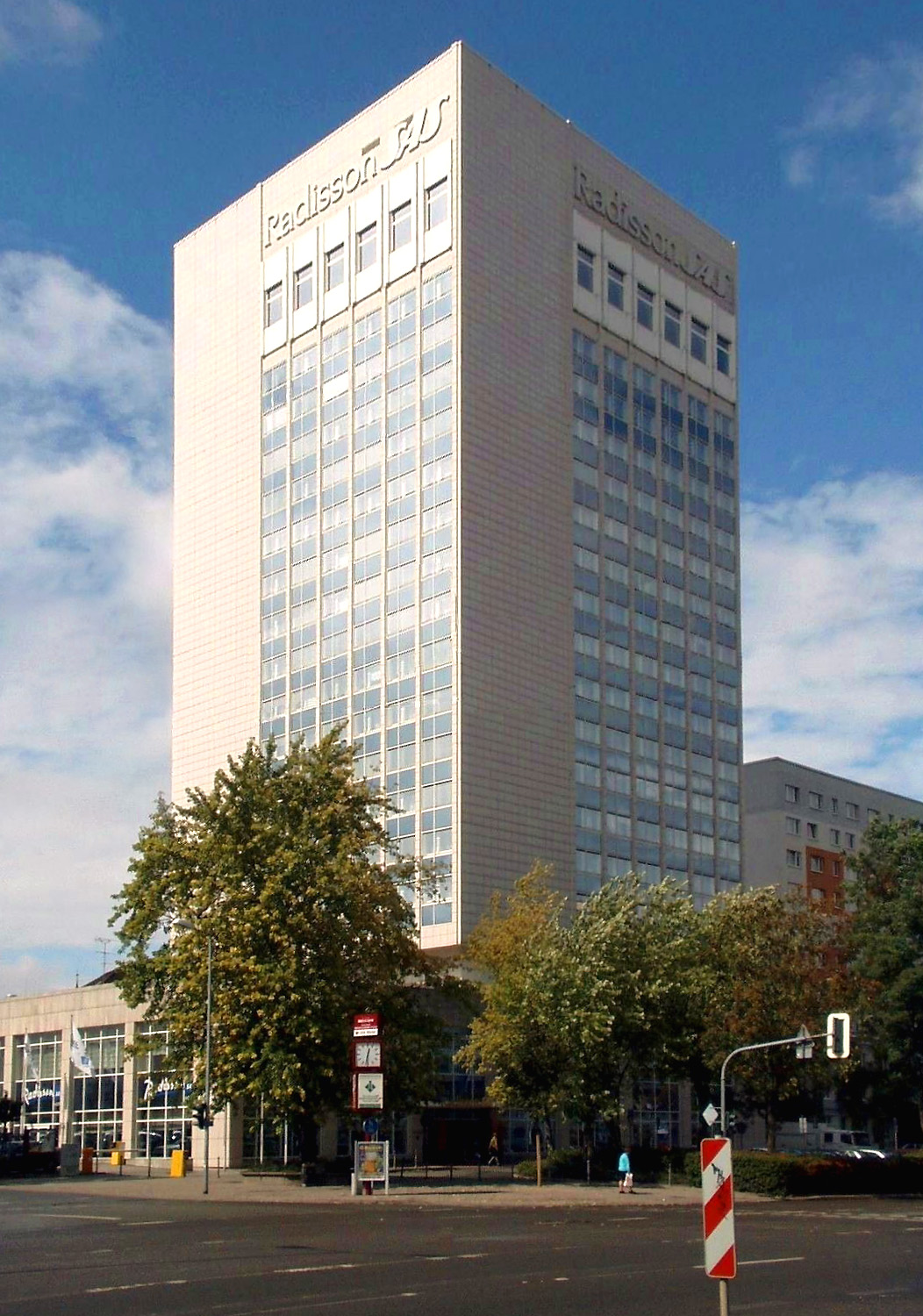
NYX Hotel Erfurt (former Hotel Kosmos), Erfurt, 2006

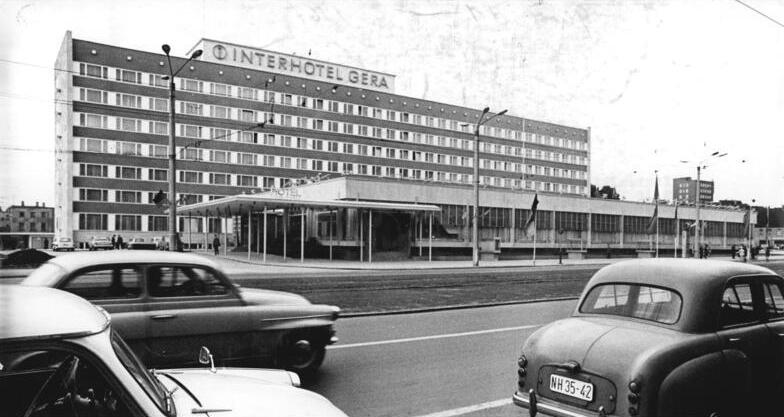
Hotel Gera, Gera, 1967

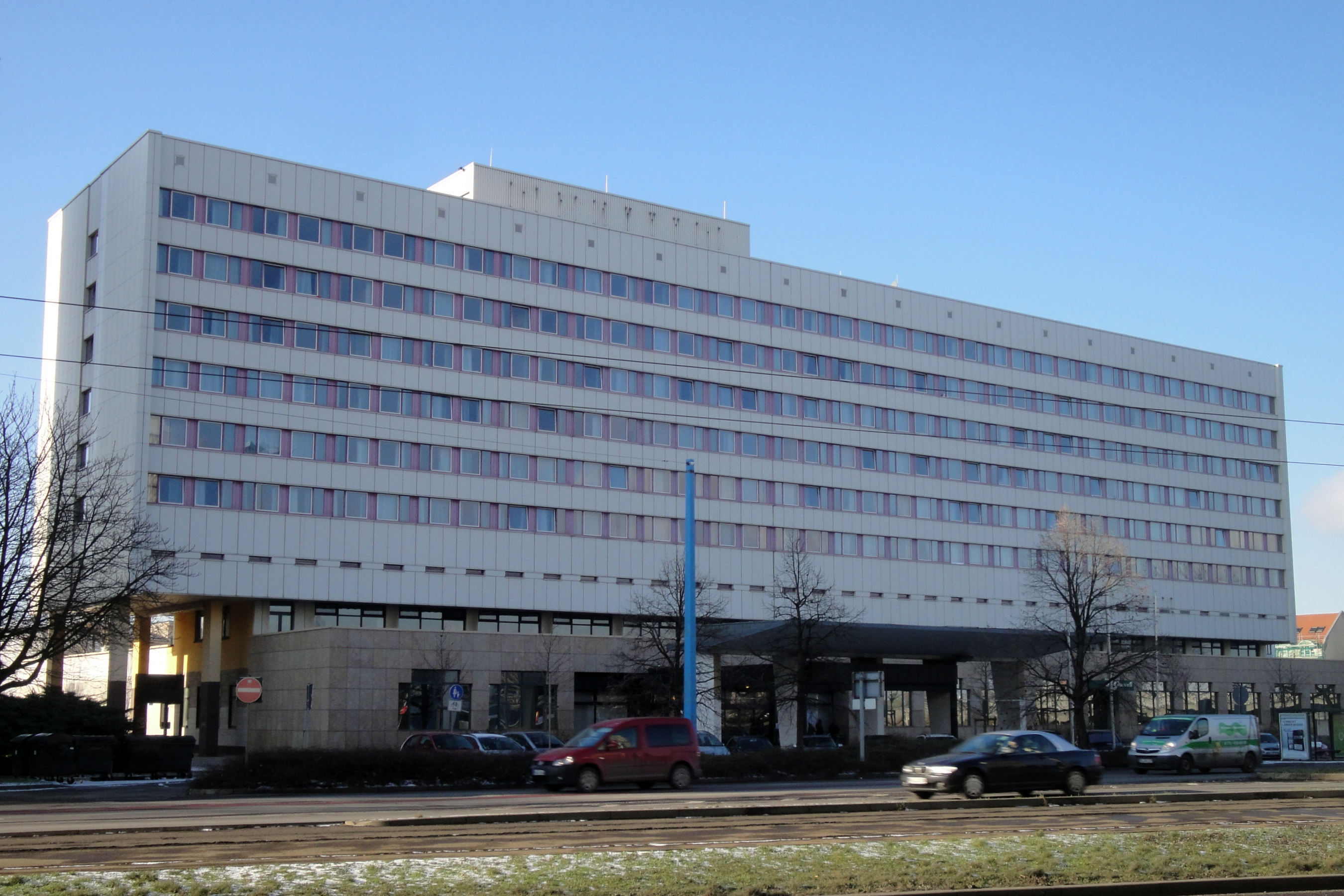
Maritim Hotel Halle (former Hotel Stadt Halle), Halle, 2016

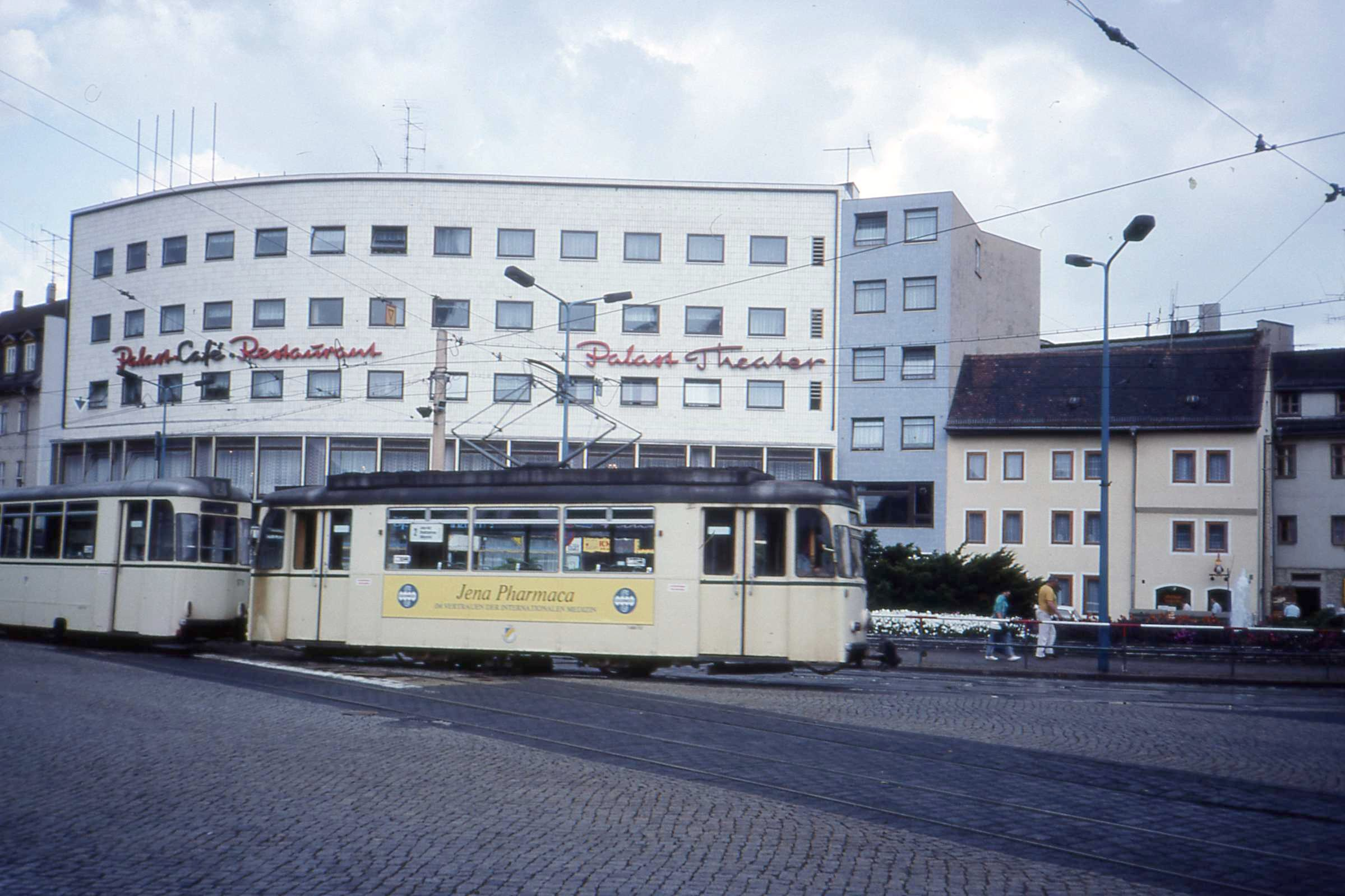
Hotel International, Jena, 1989

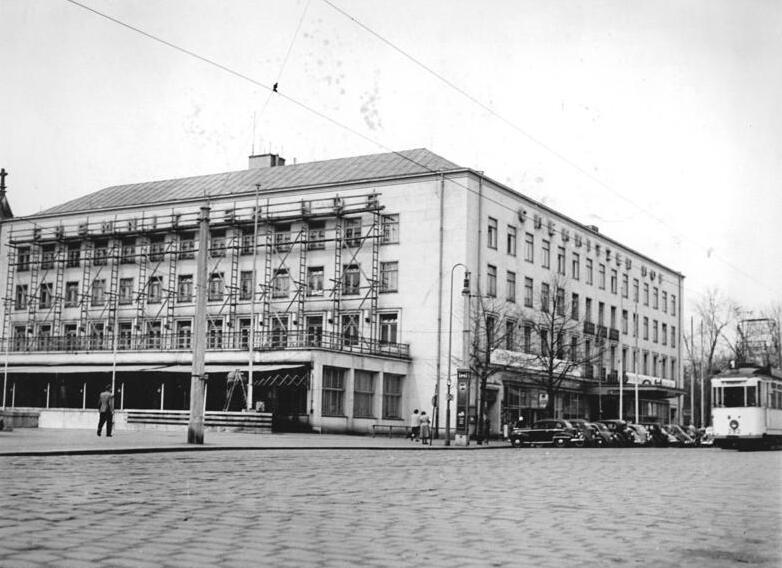
Hotel Chemnitzer Hof, Karl-Marx-Stadt, 1956

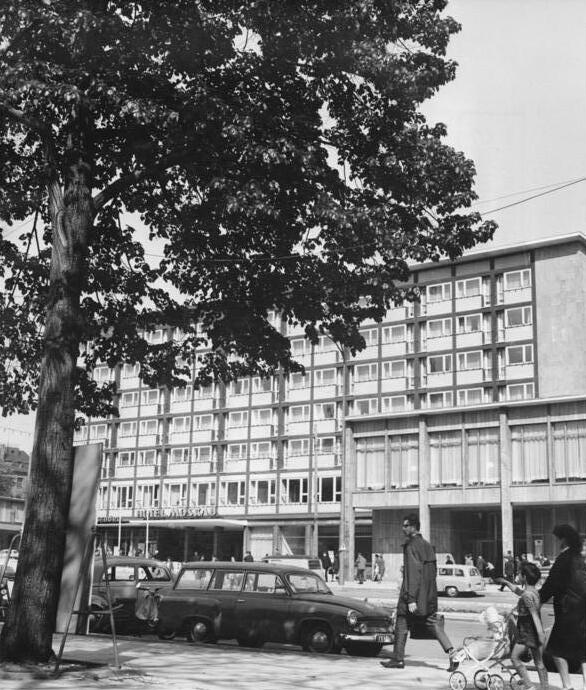
Hotel Moskau, Karl-Marx-Stadt, 1965

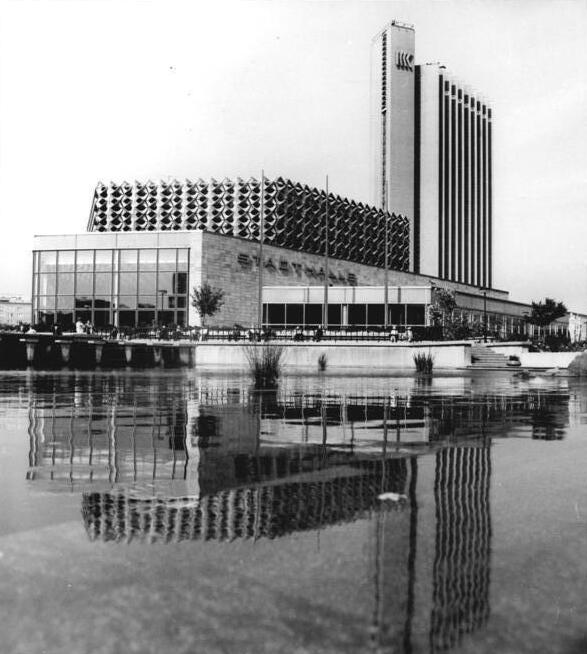
Hotel Kongress, Karl-Marx-Stadt, 1976

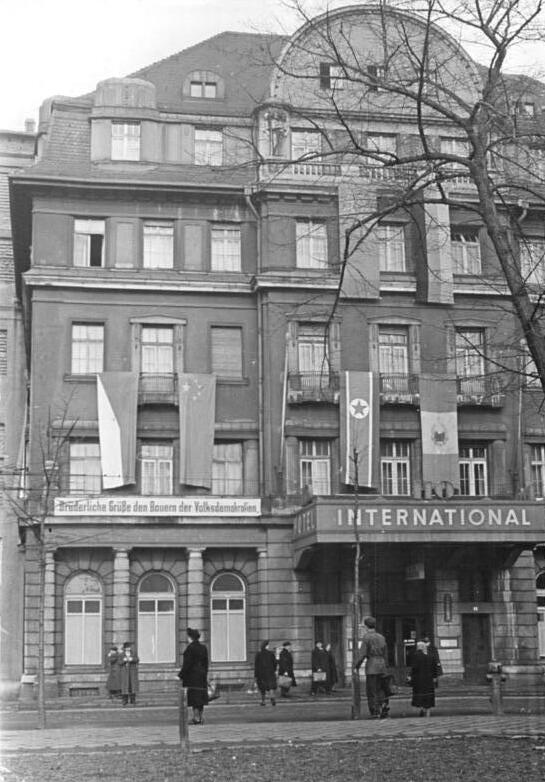
Hotel International, Leipzig, 1953

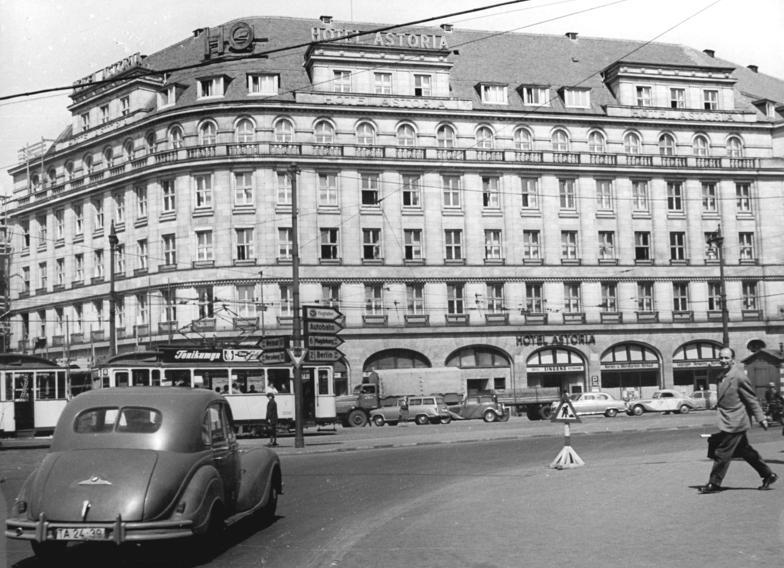
Hotel Astoria, Leipzig, 1957

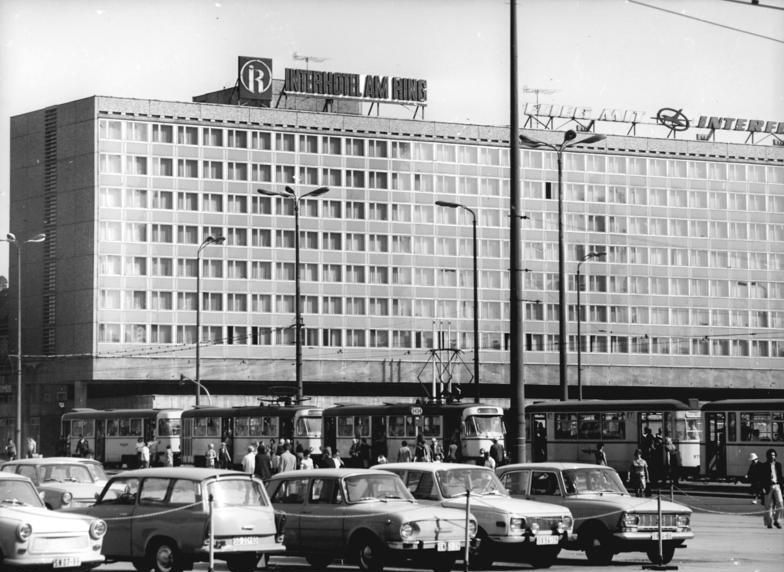
Hotel Am Ring, Leipzig, 1974

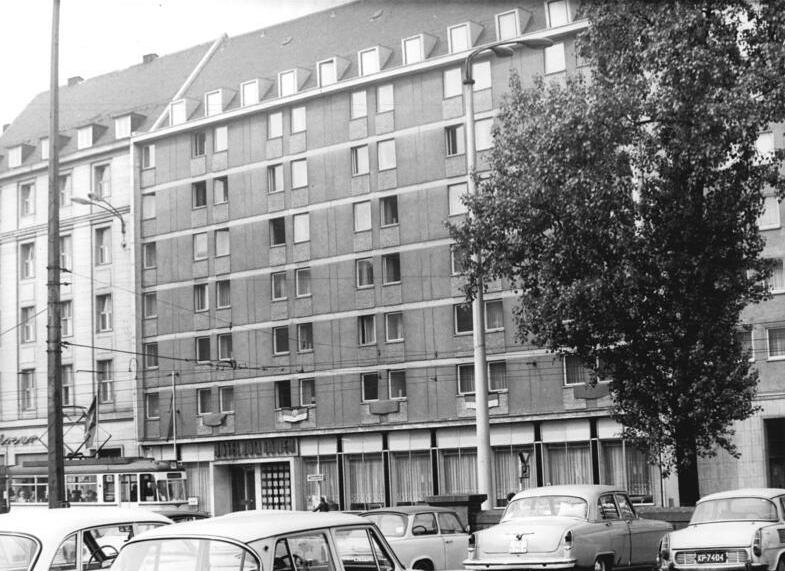
Hotel Zum Löwen, Leipzig, 1974

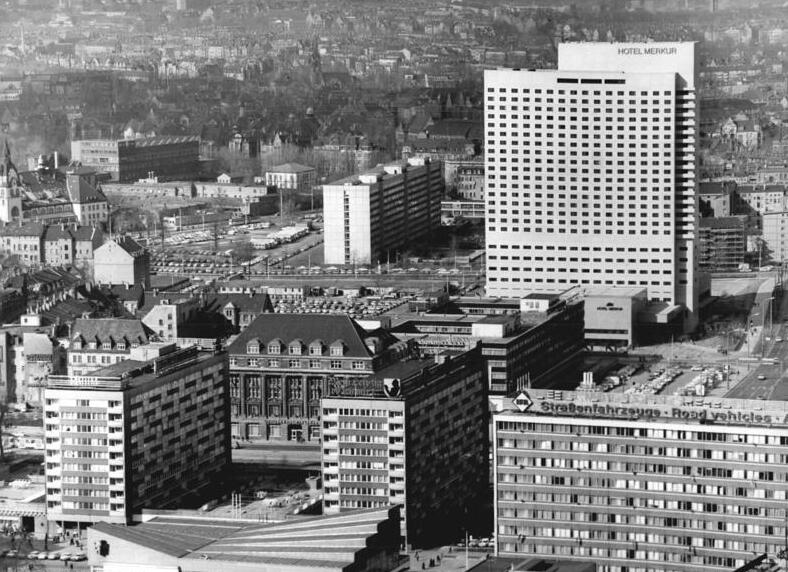
Hotel Merkur, Leipzig, 1981

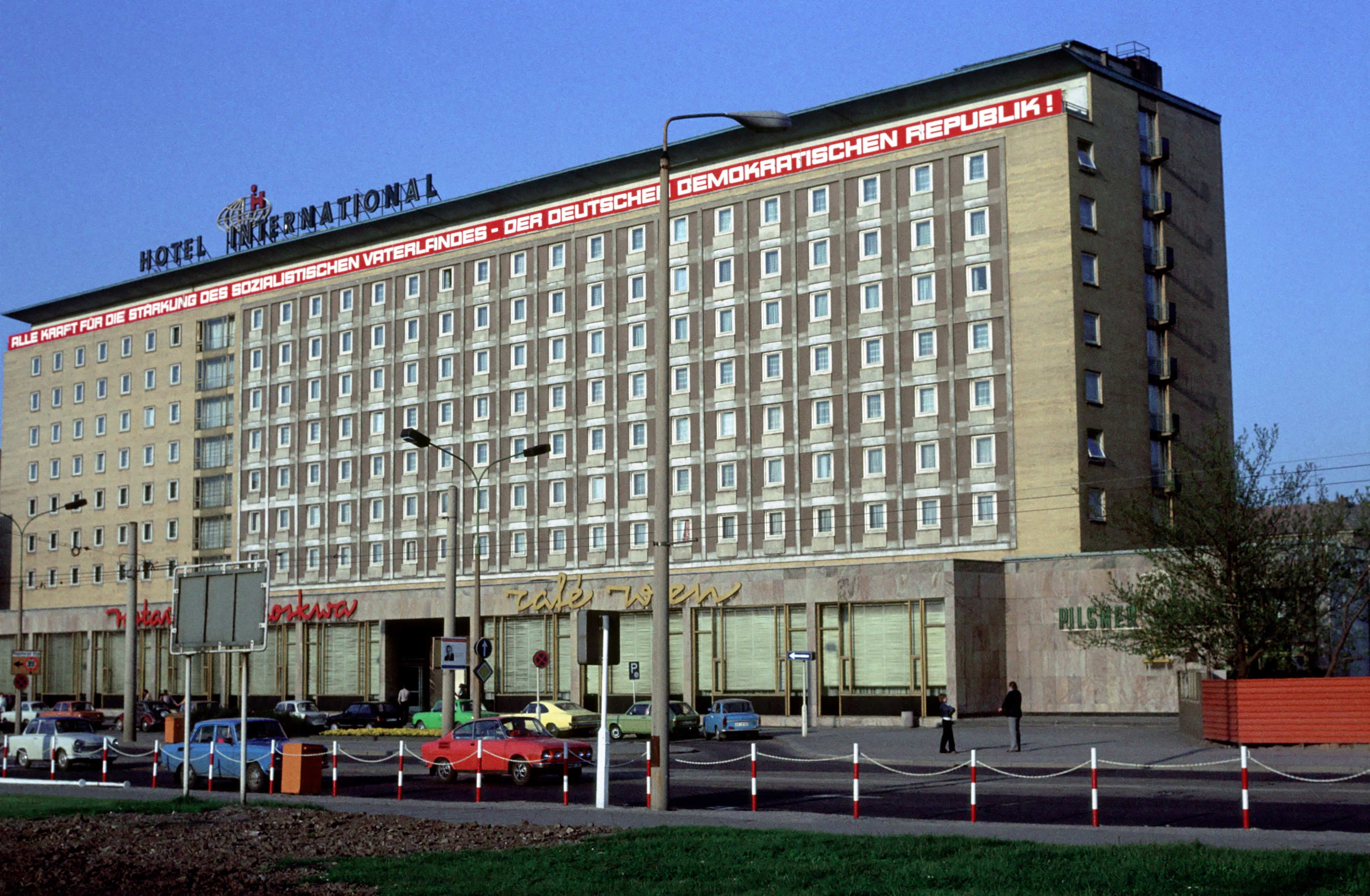
Hotel International, Magdeburg, 1980

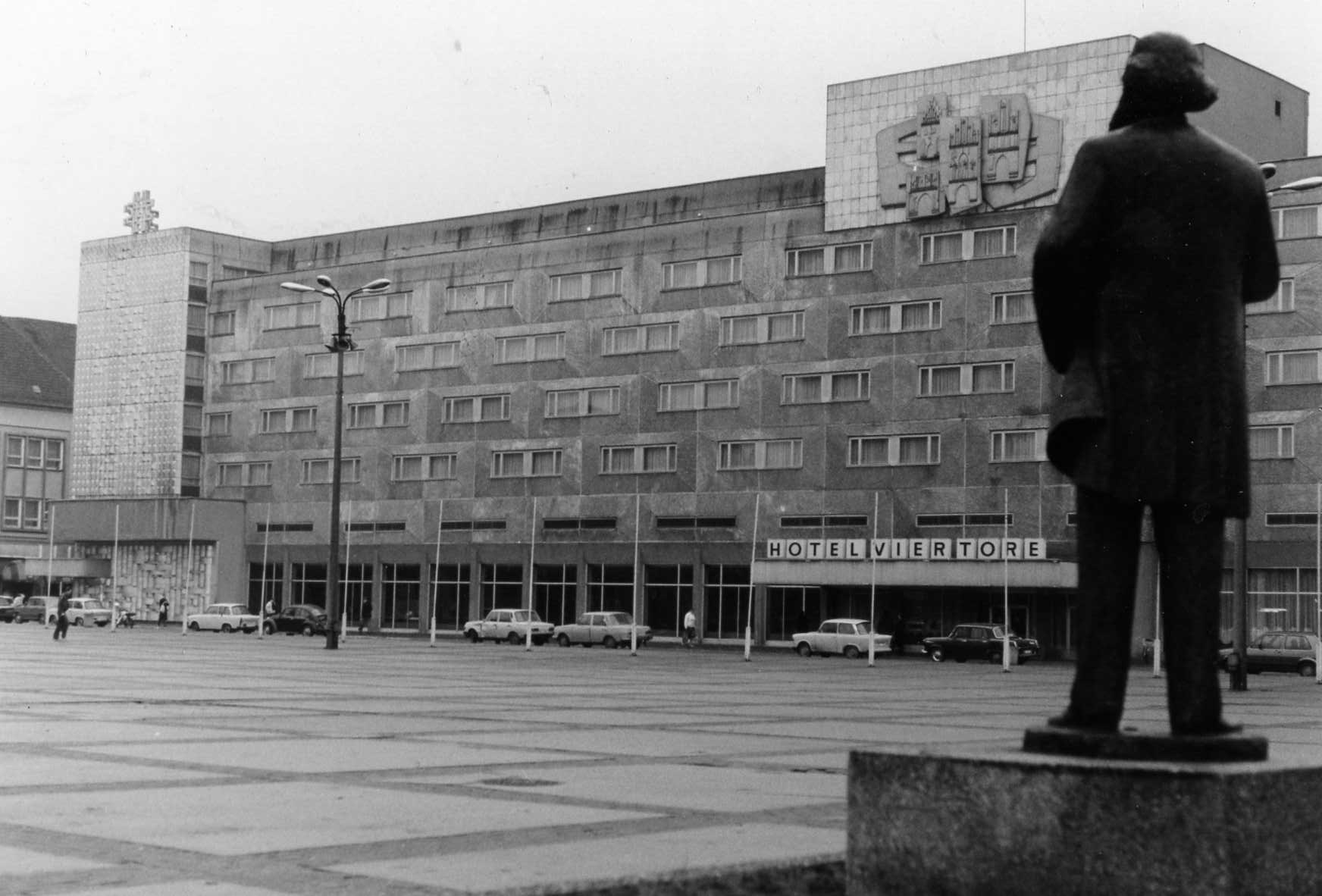
Hotel Vier Tore, Neubrandenburg, 1990

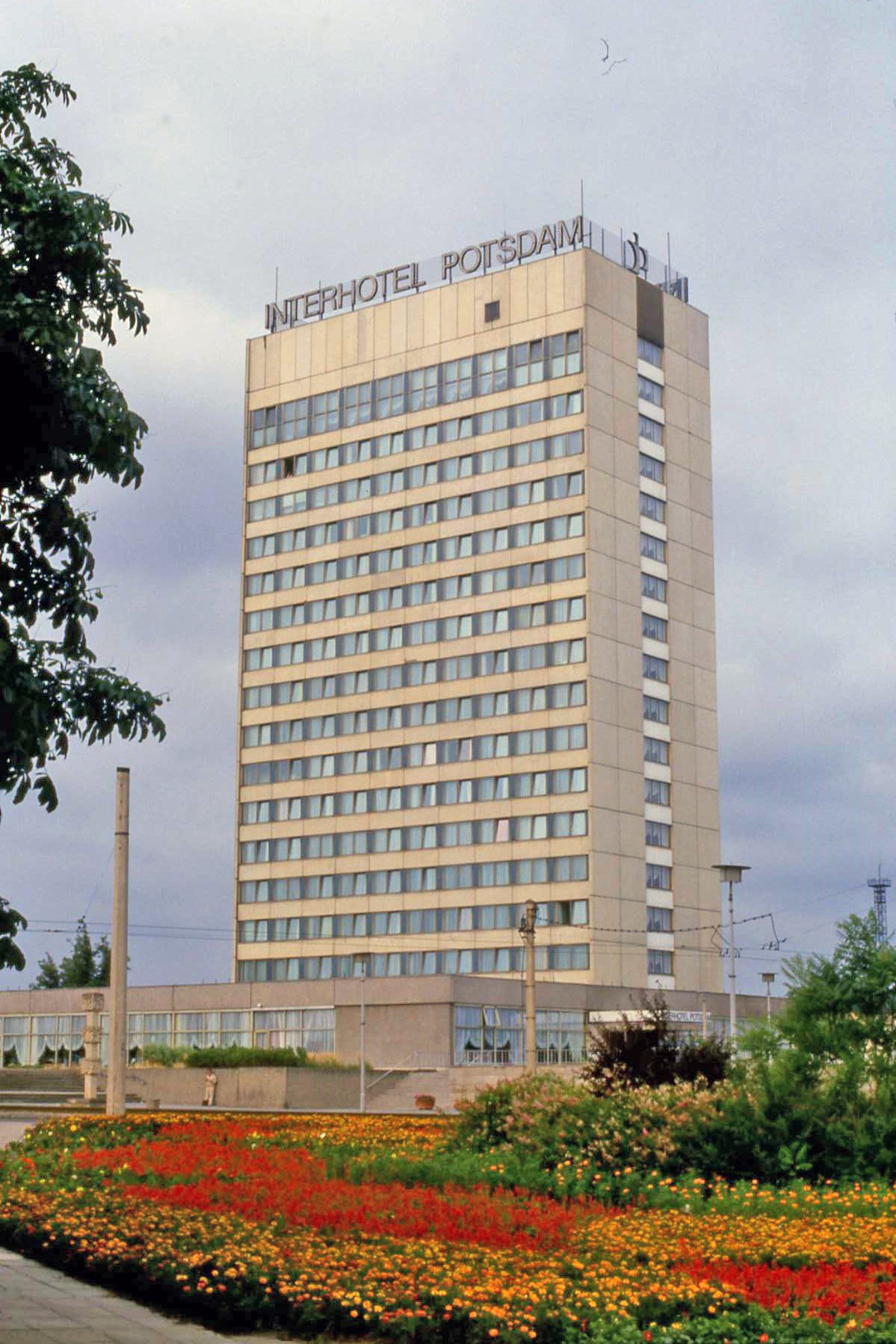
Interhotel Potsdam, 1986

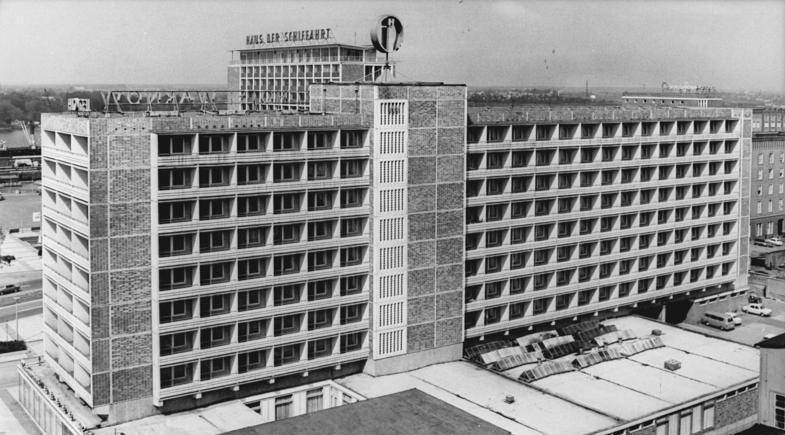
Hotel Warnow, Rostock, 1970

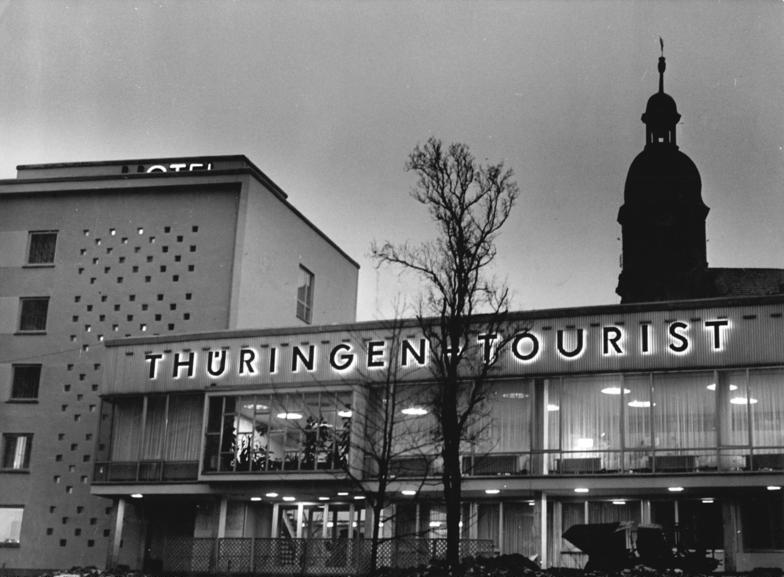
Hotel Thüringen-Tourist, Suhl, 1967

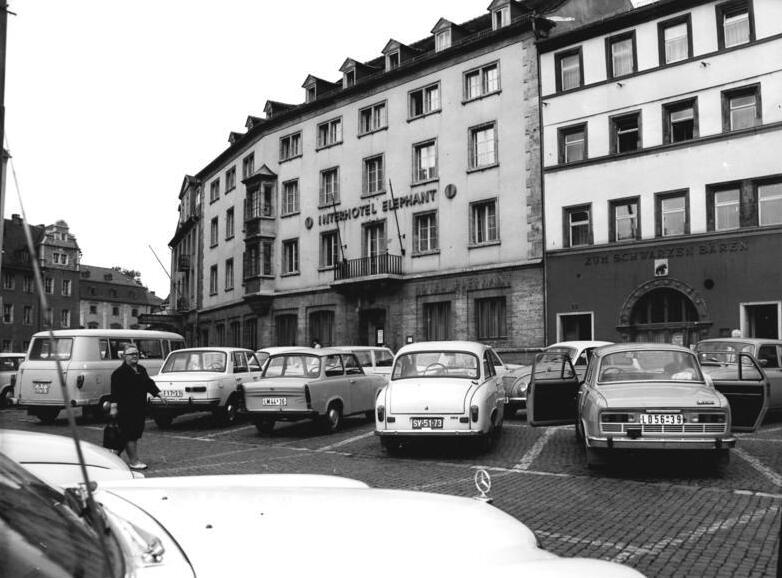
Hotel Elephant, Weimar, 1975

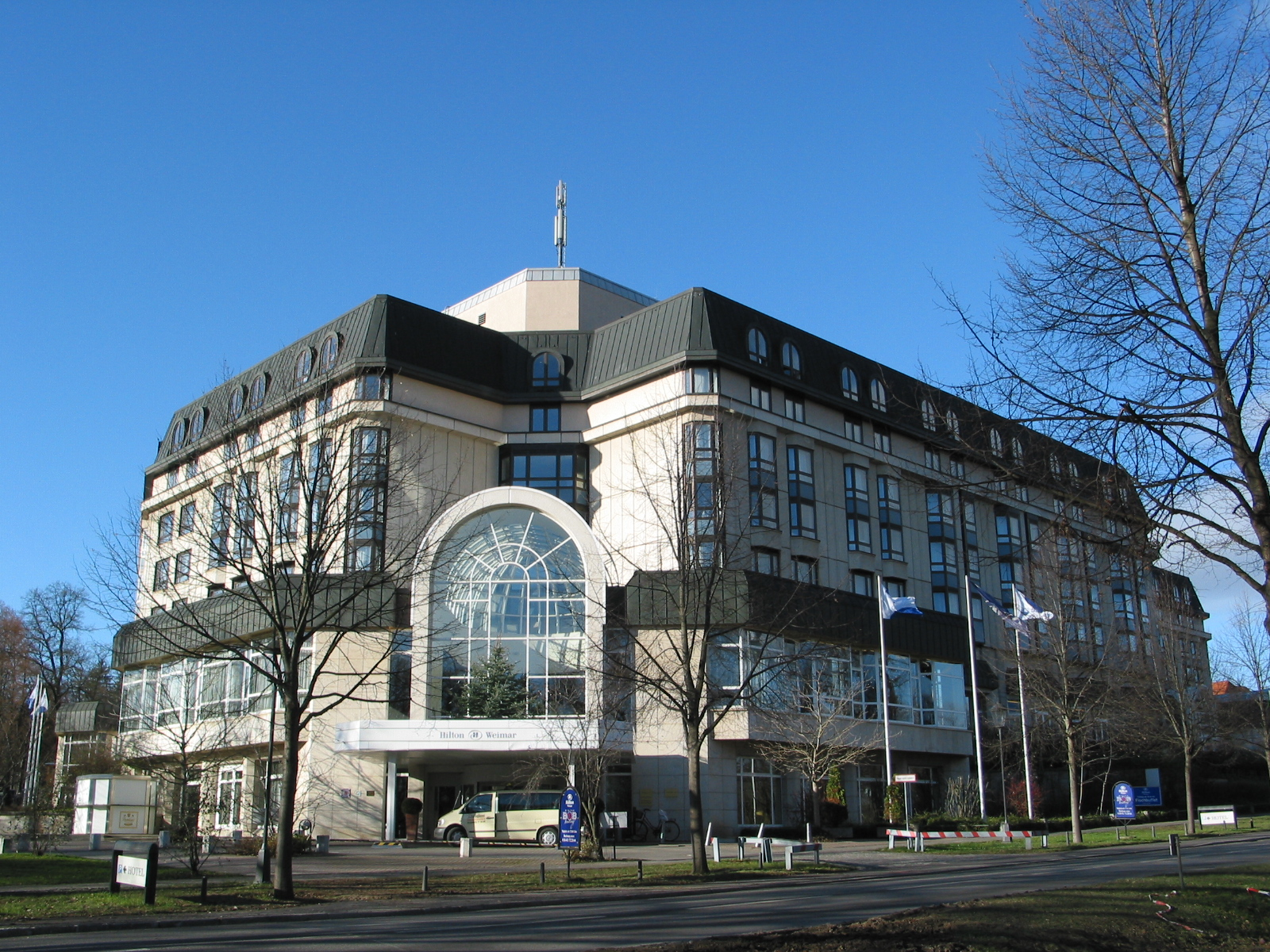
Hiton Weimar (former Hotel Belvedere), Weimar, 2005
