= 55th Guards Naval Infantry Division =

Military unit

55th Guards Kursk Orders of Zhukov and Suvorov Naval Infantry Division named after twice Hero of the Russian Federation Major General M.E. Gudkov
- 55-я гвардейская Курская орденов Жукова и Суворова дивизия морской пехоты имени дважды Героя Российской Федерации генерал-майора М.Е. Гудкова
- Active: 1 December 1968 – 1 December 2009; 1 December 2025 – present
- Country: Soviet Union (1968–1991); Russia (1991–present)
- Branch: Russian Navy
- Type: Marines
- Part of: Pacific Fleet
- Garrison/HQ: Vladivostok
- Patron: Mikhail Gudkov
- Engagements: World War II; Soviet invasion of Manchuria; First Chechen War; Second Chechen War; Russo-Ukrainian war (2022–present)
- Decorations: Guards; Order of Zhukov; Order of Suvorov
- Battle honours: Kursk

The 55th Guards Kursk Orders of Zhukov and Suvorov Naval Infantry Division named after twice Hero of the Russian Federation Major General M.E. Gudkov (Russian: 55-я гвардейская Курская орденов Жукова и Суворова дивизия морской пехоты имени дважды Героя Российской Федерации генерал-майора М.Е. Гудкова, Military Unit Number 30926) is an infantry division of the Soviet Navy and Russian Navy's Naval Infantry. The division was active from 1968 to 2009, after which it was reorganized into the 155th Naval Infantry Brigade. In 2025, the brigade was reconstituted as a division.

== History ==
=== Soviet Union ===
The 55th Naval Infantry Division originated with the formation of the 357th Rifle Regiment of the 342nd Rifle Division from the second and third submachine gun battalions of a separate rifle brigade at Novotroitskoye, Amur Oblast during the winter of 1944–1945. The first regimental commander was Major I. T. Rudnik. Receiving its battle flag on 15 March 1945, the regiment took part in the August 1945 Soviet invasion of Manchuria with the division and its parent 87th Rifle Corps. The 357th Regiment and the division were relocated from Vladivostok to Maoka on Sakhalin between 23 and 26 August. After the war, the regiment remained on Sakhalin, stationed at the settlement of Aniva. In 1957, the regiment was reorganized as the 390th Motor Rifle Regiment while the division became the 56th Motor Rifle Division. It had a strength of about 1,000 men, including twenty officers.

In the spring of 1963, the Soviet General Staff decided to restore naval infantry units in the Soviet Navy, which had been disbanded after the war. The 390th Motor Rifle Regiment was selected for transfer to the Pacific Fleet. In June, the regiment was transported on the ships of the 100th Landing Ship Brigade to Vanino, Khabarovsk Krai and then by rail to Khabarovsk. Having left its heavy weapons behind, the regiment received T-34-85 tanks, BTR-50 armored personnel carriers, GAZ-51 and ZIS-151 trucks, and other vehicles at Khabarovsk. It was brought up to strength there by junior officers freshly graduated from the military schools of the Siberian and Far Eastern Military Districts, as well as officers called up from the reserve or transferred from the Navy. In this process many officers changed their specialty: signals officers became infantry, while motor vehicle officers moved to tanks and artillery.

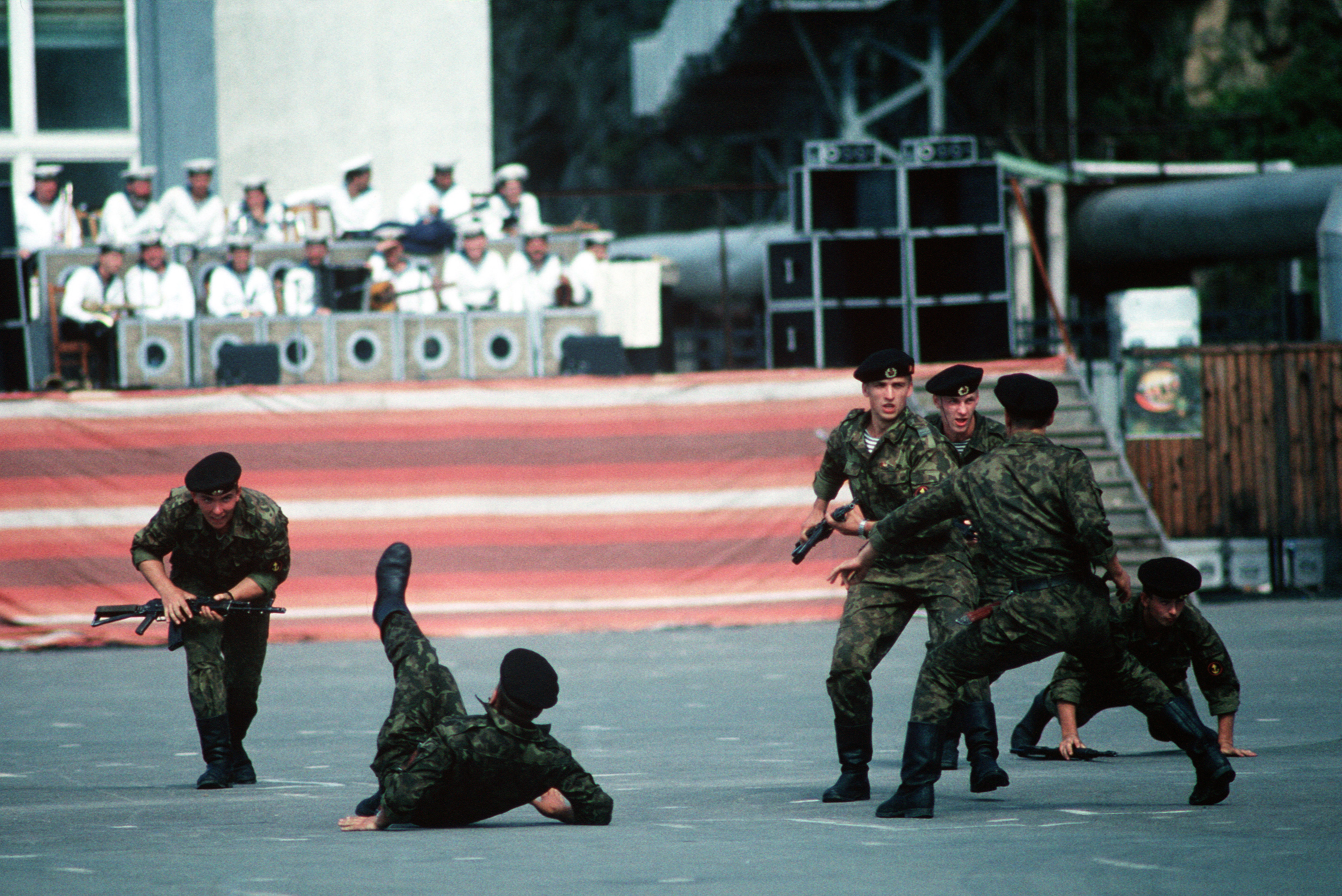
Soviet Naval Infantry put on a hand-to-hand combat demonstration, Vladivostok, 1 September 1990

In late August 1963, the regiment departed for Slavyanka, where it was housed in the barracks of a former artillery regiment, where it was redesignated the 390th Separate Naval Infantry Regiment in December and officially joined the Pacific Fleet. At first the regiment only had two dilapidated barracks, as a result of which it was forced to spend the winter in tents. In the spring of 1964 the regiment received black naval infantry uniforms to replace their army uniforms. The regiment replaced its obsolete equipment with T-54 and PT-76 tanks and BTR-60 amphibious personnel carriers in 1965. By then, the regiment included three naval infantry battalions and a T-54 tank battalion. The regimental artillery consisted of BM-21 Grad rocket launcher, SU-100 self-propelled gun, and anti-tank guided missile batteries. Air defense was provided by ZSU-23 Shilka self-propelled anti-aircraft gun and Strela-10 amphibious missile launcher batteries. In addition, the regiment included a reconnaissance company, and logistics, engineer, and chemical defense units.

In the middle of 1967, the leadership of the USSR Armed Forces decided to form a naval infantry division for the Pacific Fleet from the 390th Naval Infantry Regiment, due to the worsening situation in the Far East. Colonel Pavel Timofeyevich Shapranov became the first division commander. The formation of the division was completed on 1 December 1968. By order of the Minister of Defence of the USSR No. 007 dated February 22, 1971, December 1 was declared the "Day of the unit" of the 55th Naval Infantry Division.

By the end of its formation, the division consisted of 5 regiments (106th, 165th, 390th Naval Infantry, 150th Tank and 921st Artillery), 3 artillery battalions (336th Anti-Aircraft, 331st Self-Propelled and 129th Rocket), 3 separate battalions (263rd Reconnaissance, 509th Engineer-Landing and 1484th Signals) and 2 separate companies (91st Medical and 171st Motor Transport), with the total number of around 7,000 personnel.

The regiments received battle flags in December 1969.

During the Soviet period, the personnel of the division served in Vietnam, Ethiopia, and Somalia.

=== Russian Federation ===
The division took part in the First Chechen War and the Second Chechen War. The 165th Naval Infantry Regiment was deployed to Chechnya in January 1994, taking part in the battle of Grozny. In April, it was replaced by the consolidated 106th Naval Infantry Regiment, which included elements of the 61st and 336th Naval Infantry Brigades. The regiment operated in Chechnya until June 1994. More than 2,400 servicemen were awarded orders and medals, 63 infantrymen died in battles, five of whom became Heroes of the Russian Federation posthumously.

In 2007, division commander Colonel Valery Oleynikov was relieved of command after a series of dedovshchina incidents and beatings and humiliations of sailors by officers of the unit.

Having undergone a series of reductions and reorganizations, the division shrank to 3,100 servicemen by 2005, and on 1 December 2009, it was reorganized into the 155th Separate Naval Infantry Brigade.

In March 2025, the Russian Ministry of Defence announced a naval infantry reorganization, planning to raise all the existing naval infantry brigades to a divisional level by 2027. The 155th Brigade was to be reformed in 2025, along with one other brigade.

On 1 December 2025, the brigade was redesignated back into the 55th Naval Infantry Division, retaining all its honors and decorations. The division's 155th Regiment began forming on the same day, with the 165th Regiment scheduled to begin formation a year later.

== Commanders ==
- Major General Pavel Timofeyevich Shapranov (1967–1971)
- Major General P. F. Kazarin (1971–1975)
- Colonel V. I. Gorokhov (1975–1977)
- Colonel V. A. Yukhimchuk (1977–1980)
- Colonel V. A. Yakovlev (1980–1982)
- Colonel V. M. Govorov (1982–1986)
- Major General V. T. Kornienko (1986–1989)
- Major General Anatoly Fyodorovich Domnenko (1989–1993)
- Major General V. S. Kholod (1994–1996)
- Major General V.S. Korneyev (1996–2000)
- Major General A. Ye. Smolyak (2000–2002)
- Major General M. G. Pleshko (2002–2005)
- Colonel Valery A. Oleynikov (2005–2007)
- Major General Sergey Vitalyevich Pushkin (2007–2009)
- Colonel Igor Bushmin (2009 - 2013)
- Colonel Oleg Katsan (2013 - 2015)
- Colonel Vladimir Shipitsyn (2016)
- Tenente colonnello Aleksandr Zyuba (2016 - 20??) ad interim
- Colonel Sukhrab Akhmedov (2019 - 2021)
- Capitano di 2ª Classe Igor' Tatarchenko (2020) ad interim
- Major General Mikhail Gudkov (2021 - marzo 2025)
- Colonel Sergey Ilyn (marzo 2025 - luglio 2025) †
