= Alexander Ushkalo =

Kyrgyzstani-Russian serial killer

- Born: Alexander Nikolayevich Ushkalo; 1964 (age 61–62); Jalal-Abad, Jalal-Abad Region, Kirghiz SSR
- Other name: "Gromozeka"
- Conviction: N/A (Not guilty by reason of insanity)
- Penalty: Involuntary commitment

Details
- Victims: 6
- Span of crimes: 1998–1999
- Country: Russia
- States: Kemerovo, Novosibirsk
- Date apprehended: 26 November 1999

Alexander Nikolayevich Ushkalo (Russian: Александр Николаевич Ушкало; born 1964) is a Kyrgyzstani-Russian serial killer and thief who killed six people in robberies committed across three Russian regions from 1998 to 1999. Found not guilty by reason of insanity due to his schizophrenia, he was detained at a psychiatric facility, where he presumably remains to this day.

== Early life ==
Alexander Nikolayevich Ushkalo was born in 1964 in Jalal-Abad, Kirghiz SSR, but moved to the Novosibirsk Oblast sometime during his youth. He studied at the Novosibirsk Higher Military Command School, where he was nicknamed "Gromozeka" due to his large stature and bulky build. After graduating as a political commissar, he was dispatched to the Ukrainian SSR to work on one of the Chernobyl Nuclear Power Plant's sarcophagi. Following the reactor's meltdown in 1986, seemingly scarred by the event, Ushkalo started drinking heavily and began showing signs of mental illness, which he exhibited by writings odd poems that often referenced the sarcophagus he worked on. Due to his worsening mental behaviour, he was abandoned by his wife and child and was dishonorably discharged from the army due to disciplinary issues.

In the early 1990s, Ushkalo settled in Prokopyevsk, Kemerovo Oblast, where he lived in various apartments rented to him by elderly people. At around this time, he started burgling various offices around the city in order to steal computer monitors, which he then threw into the Ob River. His apparent reason for this action was because the monitors reminded him of the sarcophagus, and as he wanted to forget what had occurred in Chernobyl, Ushkalo resorted to "drowning" them.

== Murders ==
In October 1998, Ushkalo was living in a rented apartment together with another tenant, a young female university student who attended a local university. His landlady, an elderly pensioner, knocked on his door one day and demanded that he pay his rent of approximately 20,000 rubles. In response, Ushkalo grabbed a nearby axe and hit the woman ten times on the head, killing her. The murder was witnessed by the student, who was subsequently hacked to death. After killing both victims, Ushkalo stole 11,000 rubles, some gold jewellery and his landlady's husband's passport, whereupon he fled the city and travelled around the country.

He made his first stop in Barnaul, Altai Krai and found a place to stay, even calling the regional investigator back in Prokopyevsk and taunting him that he would be unable to catch him. But when the payment became due that same winter, he instead struck the hostess 11 times with a hammer. Believing that he had killed her, he turned on the gas stove and put a pillow on the heater, intending to let it catch on fire and cause an explosion. Ushkalo then stole a fur coat and the woman's TV and then left. His attempt to cover up his crime did not work, however, and after regaining consciousness, the hostess called the police and provided them with a description of her assailant. The authorities then made a facial composite and issued a warrant for Ushkalo's arrest. By that time, he had already returned to Novosibirsk and moved into the home of an acquaintance from military school. On a night when his acquaintance was not home, Ushkalo tied up his 24-year-old daughter with tape, stole some jewellery and house appliances, and promptly left.

Following these attacks, Ushkalo continued searching for rented apartments, selecting possible targets via classified ads posted in the newspaper. On May 30, 1999, he strangled the owner of an apartment he was living in, stealing and selling one of his carpets. Later in June, he beat a 70-year-old pensioner and burgled his apartment, before moving to a hotel near an agricultural academy and strangling one of the maids and stealing her earrings. His final kill occurred in November at another hotel: Ushkalo went to the room of the female security guard and ostensibly asked if he could use the phone, but when the victim wasn't looking, he strangled her. Afterwards, he took her pocket money, gold jewellery and a key to the hotel's safe, which contained a small amount of money.

== Arrest, trial and imprisonment ==
Alerted by the sudden upswell of similar murders in their city, authorities from Novosibirsk utilized the facial composite provided by their colleagues and started questioning everybody who resembled it, focusing on single men who lived in rented apartments. Finding Ushkalo proved to be difficult due to his solitary lifestyle, as he changed cars often and refused to leave his hiding place for long periods of time after committing a murder. Despite this, their strategy eventually allowed them to pinpoint his location to an apartment in the Kirovsky District, where Ushkalo lived under a fake identity.

Shortly after his arrest, he willingly confessed to the six murders as well as the numerous thefts of computer monitors he had committed. His confession regarding the computer monitors was initially met with disbelief, but this was soon dispelled after Ushkalo showed the investigators where he had dumped approximately 50 of them, which was confirmed by a diving team. In May 2001, he was put on trial for the murders, and during the proceedings, he was sent for a compulsory psychiatric examination at the Serbsky Center in Moscow. Although initially deemed sane, he was soon sent back for re-examination after details of his poems and other strange activities were presented at court. The results of the second examination concluded that he had schizophrenia, and as a result, could not be held legally liable for the crimes. Because of this, Ushkalo was instead confined to an undisclosed mental health facility, where he presumably remains to this day.

== See also ==
- List of Russian serial killers
