= Grozny State Oil Technical University =

University in Chechnya, Russia

- Грозненский государственный нефтяной технический университет им. акад. М.Д. Миллионщикова
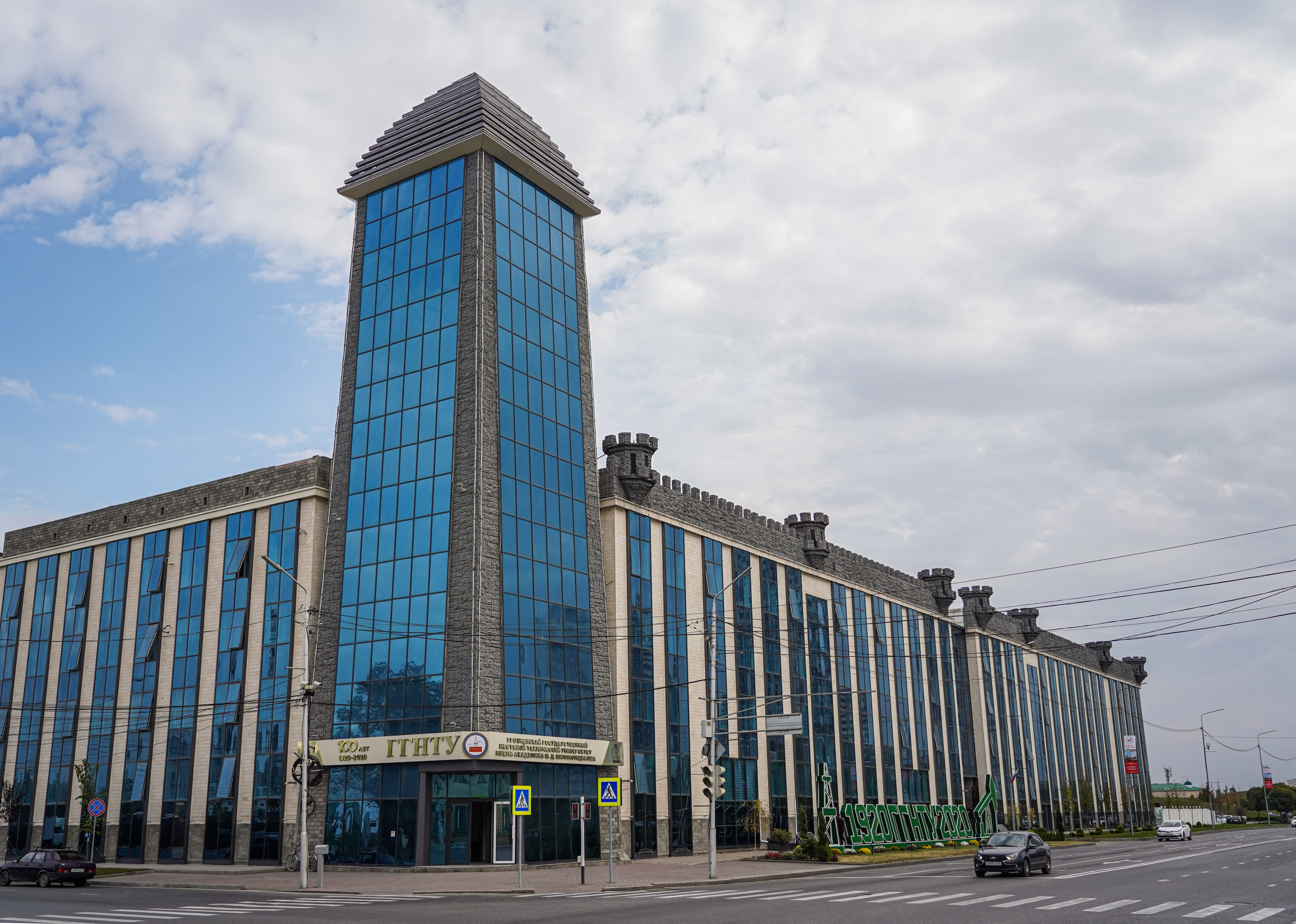
- Other name: Grozny Oil Tech
- Former name: Grozny Oil Institute
- Type: Public
- Established: 1920
- Rector: Magomed Shavalovich Mintsaev
- Academic staff: 367
- Administrative staff: 95
- Students: 10352
- Undergraduates: 7978
- Location: Isaeva prospect, 100, Grozny, 364021, Russia; 43.3199°N 45.6952°E
- Campus: Urban
- Website: gstou.ru

Grozny State Oil Technical University is the oldest oil university in Russia. It was founded in 1920 as the Higher Petroleum Technical School, with eight divisions, named after Mikhail Dmitrievich Millionshchikov. Since the Soviet Era, it has been known informally as Groznensky neftyanoi (Russian: Грозненский нефтяной). The university has its own recreation center on the Black Sea and a rest house on the Caspian Sea.

== History ==
The university started the first academic year On August 1, 1920, which brought the first 265 students. In 1942, the university was evacuated to Kokand, Uzbekistan due to the Great Patriotic War and began operating in Grozny again in 1943. In 1973, the university was named after its eminent alumnus Mikhail Dmitrievich Millionshchikov.

The university premises were destroyed twice during two war conflicts in Chechnya (1991–2000). A large percentage of the student body and faculty were killed. Rebuilding the main facilities began in 2007 under the "Federal Target Programme". In 2011, university received the official status of the Technical University of GSTU.

== Accommodation ==
All foreign students can stay in student hostels in rooms for two to three people. Rooms are equipped with the necessary furniture.

There are two kinds of rooms:

- Double rooms with a balcony, kitchen, private WC and shower;
- Suite-style rooms with different categories such as double and triple rooms with shower, WC and kitchen
- shared with another room.

Ambassador:

Currently for the international Students that want to get admitted in this University can get support and admissions information from the Current Ambassador named Golam Hasnat Mohammad Rafi (Email: golam.hasnat.mohammad.rafi @ gmail. com).

== Institutes and faculties ==
=== Institute of Oil and Gas ===
The Institute of Oil and Gas is the university's largest department, created in 2017 through the merger of three faculties, Field Geological, Oil Mechanical, and Oil Technological. In 2018, the institute was named after the academician Salambek Khadzhiev. The institute is located in academic building #1 in the city of Grozny.

There are 10 departments, two of which are university-wide:

- General and Inorganic Chemistry
- Applied Mechanics and Engineering Graphics
- Applied Geology
- Applied Geophysics and Geoinformatics
- Development and Operation of Oil and Gas Fields
- Technological Machines and Equipment
- Applied Chemistry of Oil and Gas
- Health Safety
- Environmental and Nature Management
- Technology of Foodstuffs and Fermentation Industry

=== Institute of Construction, Architecture and Design ===
The institute is located in the historic center of the city of Grozny in academic building No 2. The history of the Institute dates back to 1950 when the Construction Department was opened.

It was the Chechen Republic's only higher educational establishment to prepare civil engineers as of December 2021. Both undergraduate and postgraduate degrees are offered in Russian.

There are five departments:

- Construction Technology
- Building Structures
- Geodesy and Land Cadaster
- Survey, Property Management and Heat and Gas Supply
- Architecture

=== Notable alumni ===
Dena Bataev, Director of Kh.Ibragimov Complex Institute of the Russian Academy of Sciences.

=== Institute of Applied Information Technologies ===
The institute is located in the main building of the university just across the Heart of Chechnya's Central Mosque. Both undergraduate and postgraduate degrees are offered here in Russian.

There are four departments:

- Informatics and Computer Engineering.
- Information Technology.
- Information Management System in Economics.
- Telecommunications Network and Switching System.

=== Notable alumni ===
- Magomed Selimkhanov, Deputy of the State Duma of the Federal Assembly of the Russian Federation
- Suliman Masaev, Deputy CEO of Rosseti, Northern Caucasus
- Salambek Abdulazimov, Prorector for IT of Chechen State University

=== Institute of Digital Economy and Technological Entrepreneurship ===
The institute is located in academic building No 1. The Institute traces its history to 2016 when the Public Administration Faculty was founded. In 2019, it was reformed into its current structure. Both undergraduate and postgraduate degrees are offered here in Russian.

There are eight departments:

- Information Systems in Economics
- Information Law and Jurisprudence
- Business and Innovation Management
- Economics and Enterprise Management
- General Humanitarian Disciplines
- Interfaculty Language Department
- Physical Education
- Economic Theory and Public Administration
