= Grozny-City =

Business and hotel complex in Chechnya, Russia

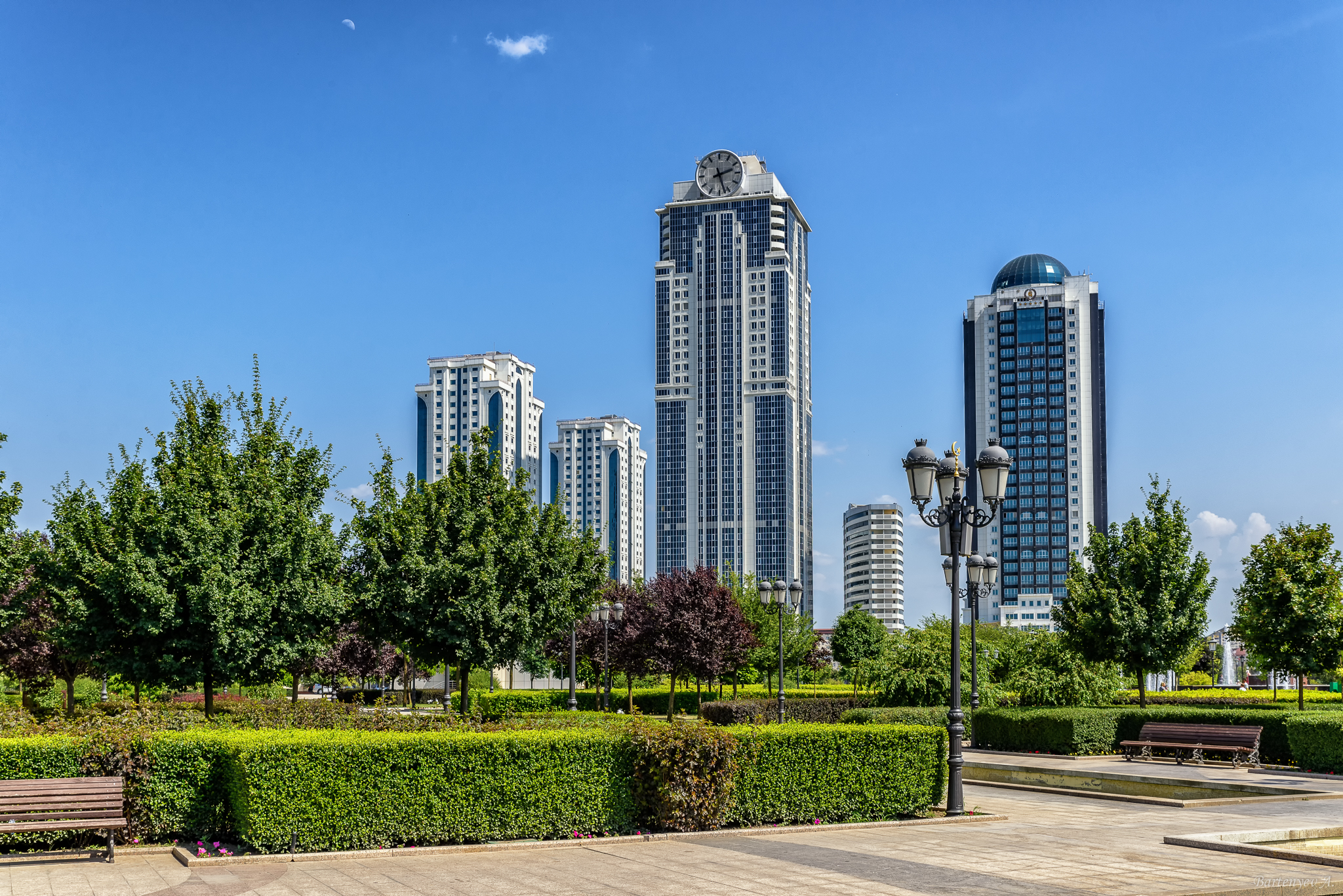
Grozny-City Towers

The Grozny-City (Russian: Грозный-сити) is a five-star skyscraper hotel and business centre complex located near the Akhmad Kadyrov Mosque in Grozny, Chechnya, Russia.

== Design ==
The architectural design belongs to Deniz Ceyhun Baykan and Structural design was done by Yüksel Konkan. The towers opened on 5 October 2011, during the birthday celebration for Chechnyan President Ramzan Akhmadovich Kadyrov. Grozny-City Towers is a five-star skyscraper hotel, 40-storey apartment building, and business centre complex located near Grozny Central Mosque. Grozny-City's Phoenix building is the tallest building in Chechnya.

== Facade Clocks ==
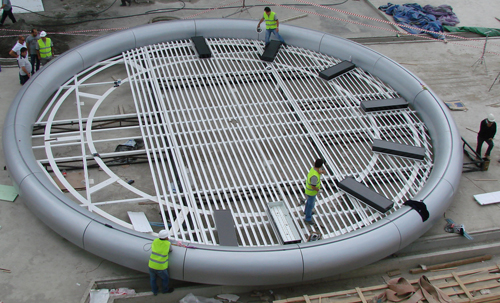
Construction of the clocks

The Grozny-City Clocks, located at approximately 43.3158°N 45.6967°E, are near the apex of the northwest and southeast sides of the Grozny-City Towers.

Weight

The dial of each clock, including the hands and clock movement, weighs about 5,200 kilograms (5.7 short tons).

- Hour hand: 250 kilograms (550 lb) each
- Minute hand: 400 kilograms (880 lb) each
- Clock movement: 500 kilograms (1,100 lb) each

Dials

The dials of each clock are made of "Bri-Curtain" LED arrays formed of aluminium, designed to both save weight and offer less resistance to wind.

Hands

Each pair of hands is made of seawater-resistant aluminium, statically and dynamically balanced. They measure 7,300 millimetres (290 in) for the minute hand, and 5,500 millimetres (220 in) for the hour hand.

=== 2013 fire ===
On April 3, 2013, the Facade Clocks caught fire and one side of the 40-story building was engulfed in flames. No one was injured or killed in the blaze. More than 100 firefighters and 16 fire engines fought the blaze. The building known locally as "Olympus" housed a 5 star luxury hotel and an apartment belonging to French film star and French tax exile Gérard Depardieu, whose apartment was on the 27th floor facing the "Heart of Grozny."

== December 2025 drone attack ==
On 5 December 2025, an office tower in the complex sustained significant damage as a result of a Ukrainian long range drone attack. A large portion of the building facade was damaged in the resulting explosion and a fire occurred in the aftermath.

== See also ==
- List of tallest buildings in Europe
- List of largest clock faces
