= Grozny =

Capital of Chechnya, Russia

Grozny Грозный
- City

Other transcription(s)
  - Chechen: Соьлжа-ГӀала, Sölƶa-Ġala
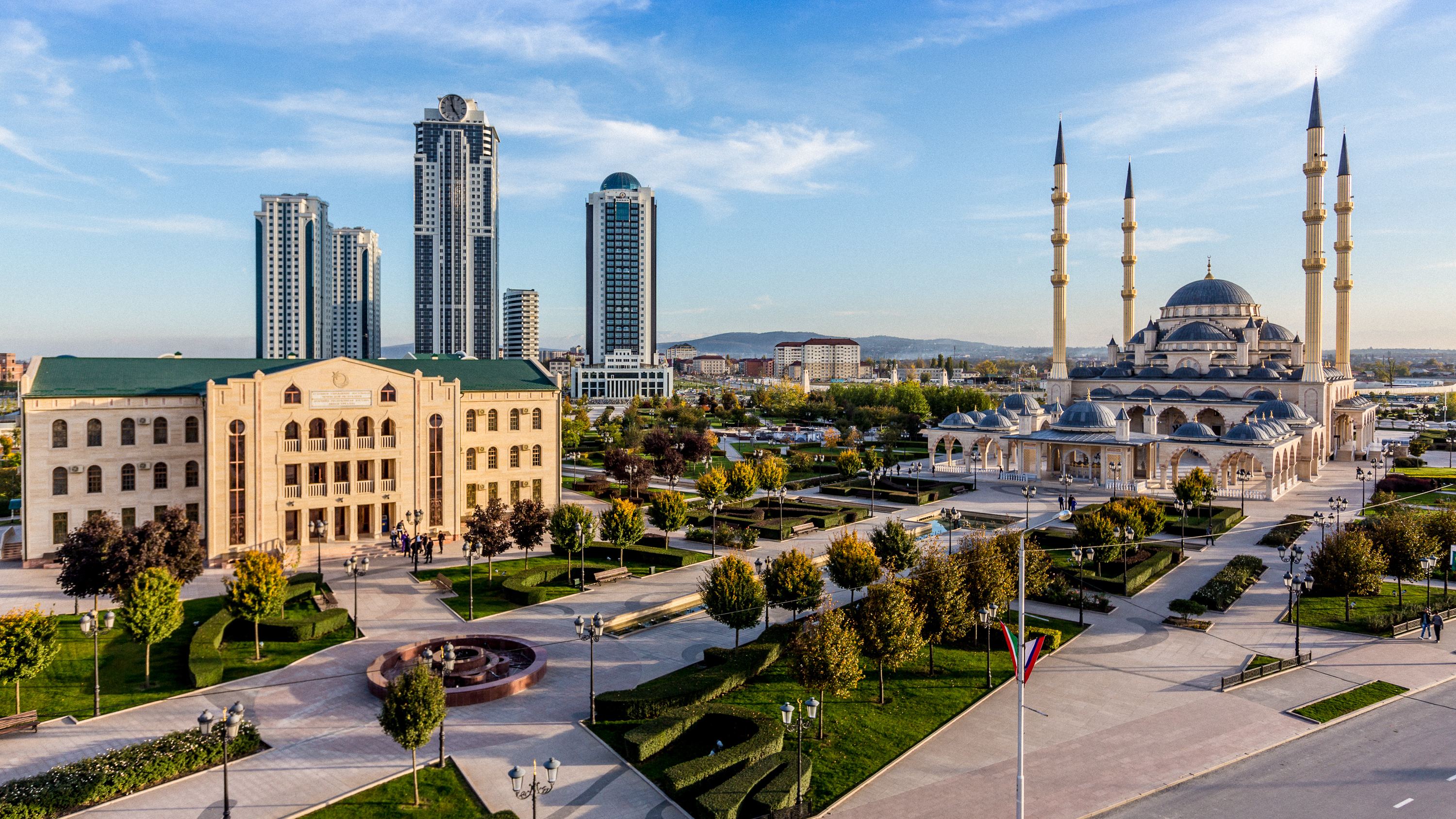
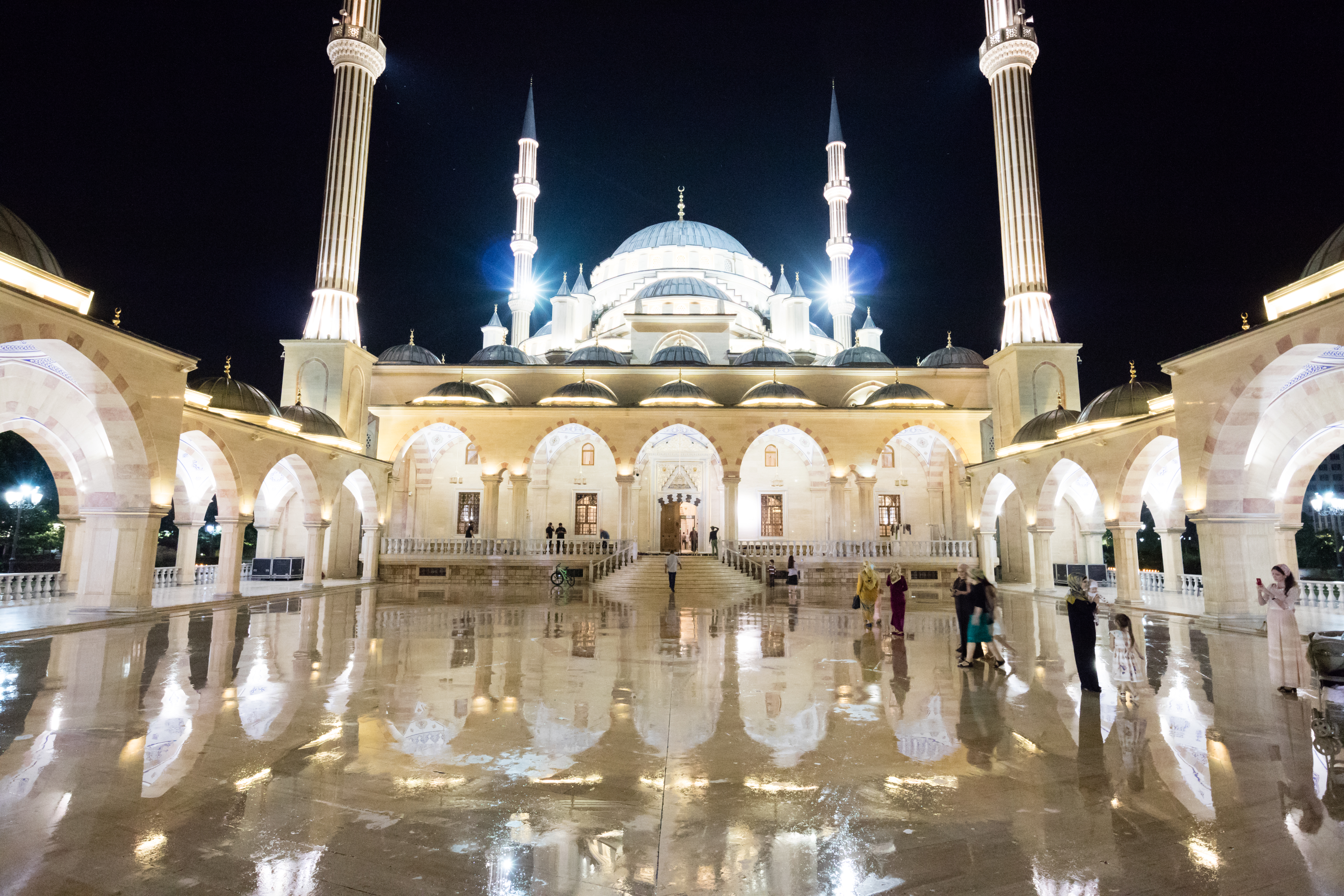
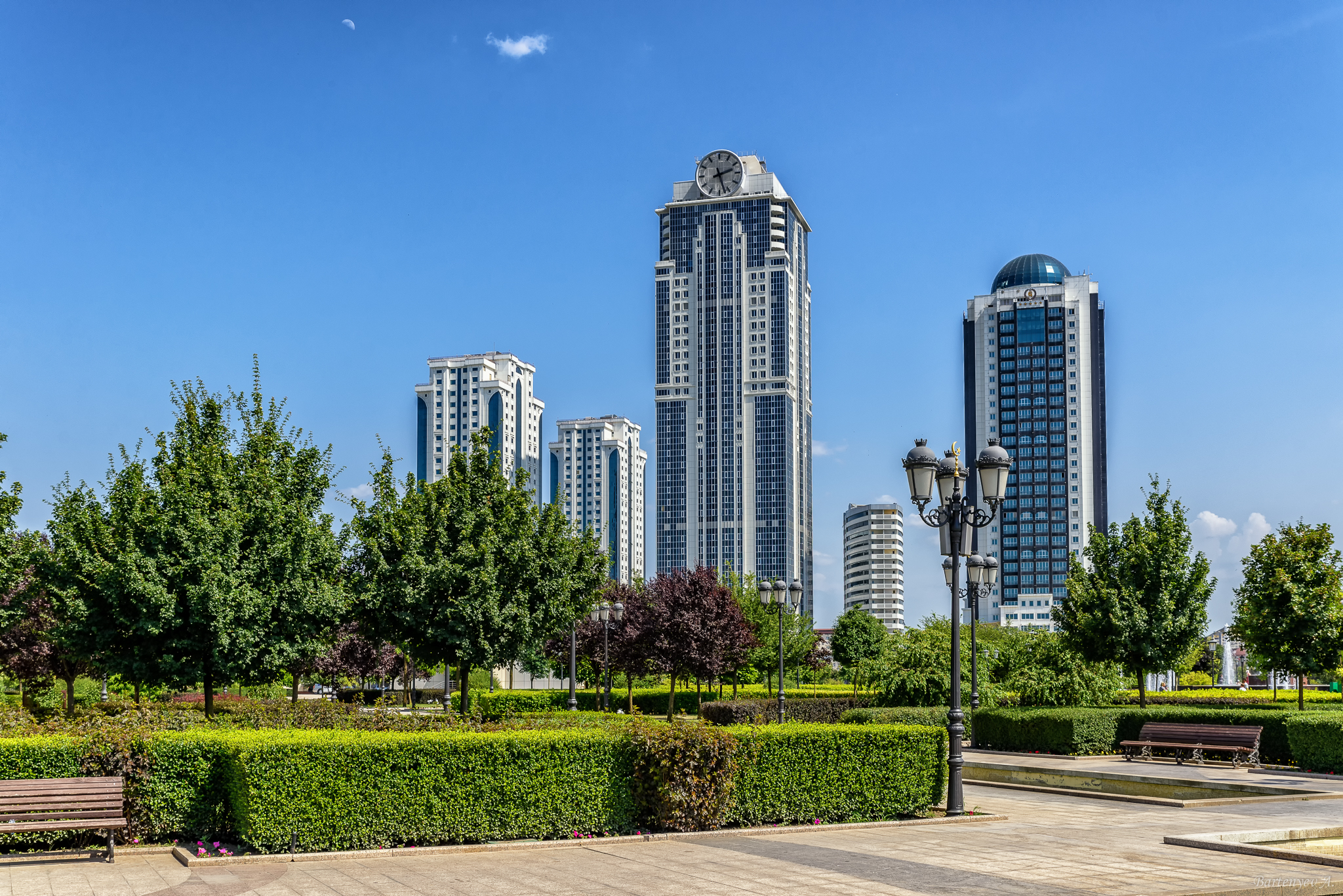
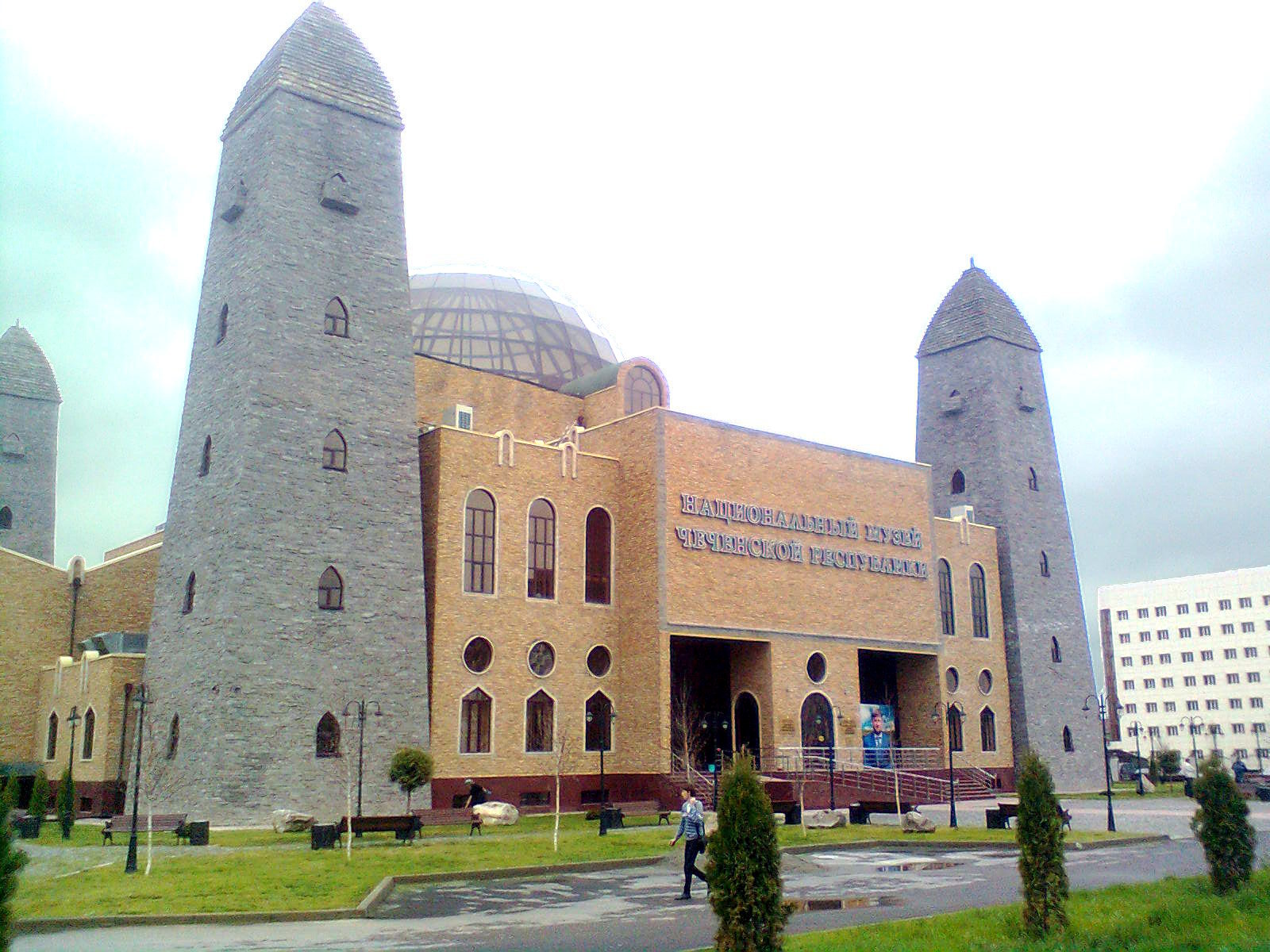
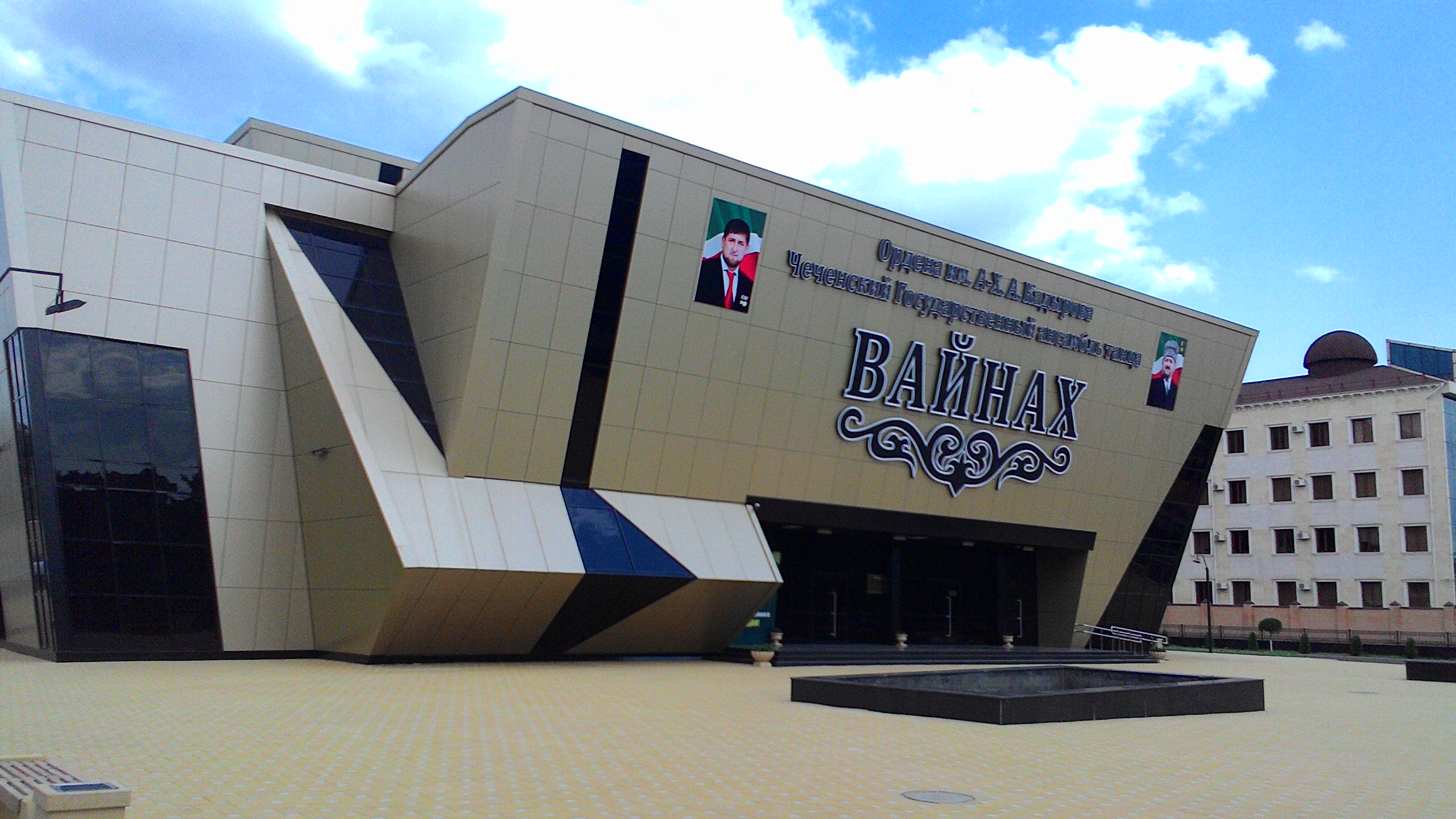
- Clockwise from the top, Kadyrov Square, Grozny City Towers, Vaynakh School of Dance, National Museum of the Chechen Republic, The Courtyard of Akhmad Kadyrov Mosque at night

- Flag Coat of arms
- Interactive map of Grozny
- Location of Grozny Grozny (European Russia) Grozny (Europe)
- Coordinates: 43°18′45″N 45°41′55″E
- Country: Russia
- Federal subject: Chechnya
- Founded: 1818
- City status since: 1869

Government
  - Body: Council of Deputies
  - Mayor: Khas-Magomed Kadyrov

Area
  - Total: 324.16 km^{2} (125.16 sq mi)
- Elevation: 130 m (430 ft)

Population
  - Estimate (2023): 331,402 )

Administrative status
  - Subordinated to: city of republic significance of Grozny
  - Capital of: Chechen Republic
  - Capital of: city of republic significance of Grozny

Municipal status
  - Urban okrug: Grozny Urban Okrug
  - Capital of: Grozny Urban Okrug, Groznensky Municipal District
- Time zone: UTC+3 (MSK)
- Postal codes: 364000, 364001, 364006, 364008, 364011, 364013–364018, 364020–364022, 364024, 364028–364031, 364034, 364035, 364037, 364038, 364040, 364042, 364043, 364046, 364047, 364049, 364051, 364052, 364058, 364060–364063, 364066, 364068, 364700, 366000
- Dialing code: +7 8712
- OKTMO ID: 96701000001
- City Day: October 5
- Website: grozmer.ru

Grozny (Russian: Грозный, IPA: [ˈgroznɨj]; Chechen: Соьлжа-ГӀала, romanised: Sölƶa-Ġala) is the capital city of Chechnya, Russia. The city lies on the Sunzha River. According to the 2021 census, it had a population of 328,533, up from 210,720 recorded in the 2002 census, but still less than the 399,688 recorded in the 1989 census prior to destruction of the city in two wars in Chechnya. It was previously known as Groznaya (until 1870).

== Names ==
In Russian, "Grozny" means "fearsome", "menacing", or "redoubtable", the same word as in Ivan Grozny (Ivan the Terrible). While the official name in Chechen is the same, informally the city is known as "Соьлжа-Гӏала" ("Sölƶa-Ġala"), which literally means "the city (гӏала) on the Sunzha River (Соьлжа)".

In 1997, the authorities of the Chechen republic of Ichkeria renamed the city Dzhokhar-Ghala (Chechen: Джохар-ГӀала, romanised: Dƶoxar-Ġala), literally Dzhokhar City, or Dzhokhar/Djohar for short, after Dzhokhar Dudayev, the first president of the republic, who was killed in the First Chechen War.
In December 2005, the Chechen parliament voted to rename the city Akhmad-Ghala (Chechen: Ахмад-ГIала, romanised: Axmad-Ġala), after Akhmad Kadyrov) – a proposition which was rejected by his son Ramzan Kadyrov, the prime minister at the time and later president of the republic.

== History ==
=== Russian fort ===
The fortress of Groznaya (Гро́зная; lit. fearsome – a feminine form of Grozny, as the word fortress, "крепость", is feminine in Russian) was founded in 1818 as a Russian military outpost on the Sunzha River by general Aleksey Petrovich Yermolov. As the fort was being built, the workers were fired upon by the Chechens. The Russians found a solution by strategically positioning a cannon outside the city walls. When night fell and the Chechens came out of their hiding places to drag the gun away, all the other guns opened up with grapeshot. When the Chechens recovered their senses and began to carry away the bodies, the guns fired again. When it was over, 200 dead were counted. Thus did the "fearsome" fort receive its baptism of fire. It was a prominent defence centre during the Caucasian War.

Russian poets Alexander Griboedov, Alexander Polezhayev, Mikhail Lermontov, the classic of Russian literature Leo Tolstoy, the Decembrist and writer Alexander Bestuzhev and other famous figures of Russian culture visited the fortress. After the annexation of the region by the Russian Empire, the military use of the old fortress was obsolete and on 11 January 1870 [O.S. 30 December 1869] it was granted town status and renamed Grozny, as the word town, "город", is masculine in Russian. As most of the residents there were Terek Cossacks, the town grew slowly until the development of oil reserves in the early 20th century. The founder of the Nobel Prize, Alfred Nobel, took part in the development of the oil industry of the city of Grozny, as well as members of the Rothschild family. In addition to the Nobels and Rothschilds, British companies played an important role in the oil industry from 1893 onward. Alfred Stuart, an English engineer, completed the first well in Grozny by drilling in 1893 the largest oil field in the Caucasus region outside the Baku district.

Eleven firms drilled 116 wells before 1900. This encouraged the rapid development of industry and petrochemical production. In addition to the oil drilled in the city itself, the city became a geographical centre of Russia's network of oil fields, and in 1893 became part of the Transcaucasia–Russia-proper railway. The result was the population almost doubled from 15,600 in 1897 to 30,400 in 1913. In early 1914, the then largest oil company, Royal Dutch Shell, was established in the city thus making Grozny one of the largest industrial centres of the Caucasus. During the Russian Empire, the city was the administrative capital of the Groznensky Okrug of the Terek Oblast.

=== Soviet regional capital ===
One day after the October Revolution, on 8 November 1917, the Bolsheviks headed by N. Anisimov seized Grozny. As the Russian Civil War escalated, the Proletariat formed the 12th Red Army, and the garrison held out against numerous attacks by Terek Cossacks from 11 August to 12 November 1918. However, with the arrival of Denikin's armies, the Bolsheviks were forced to withdraw and Grozny was captured on 4 February 1919, by the White Army. Underground operations were carried out, but only the arrival of the Caucasus front of the Red Army in 1920 allowed the city to permanently end up with the Russian SFSR on 17 March. Simultaneously it became part of the Soviet Mountain Republic, which was formed on 20 January 1921, and was the capital of the Chechen National Okrug inside it.

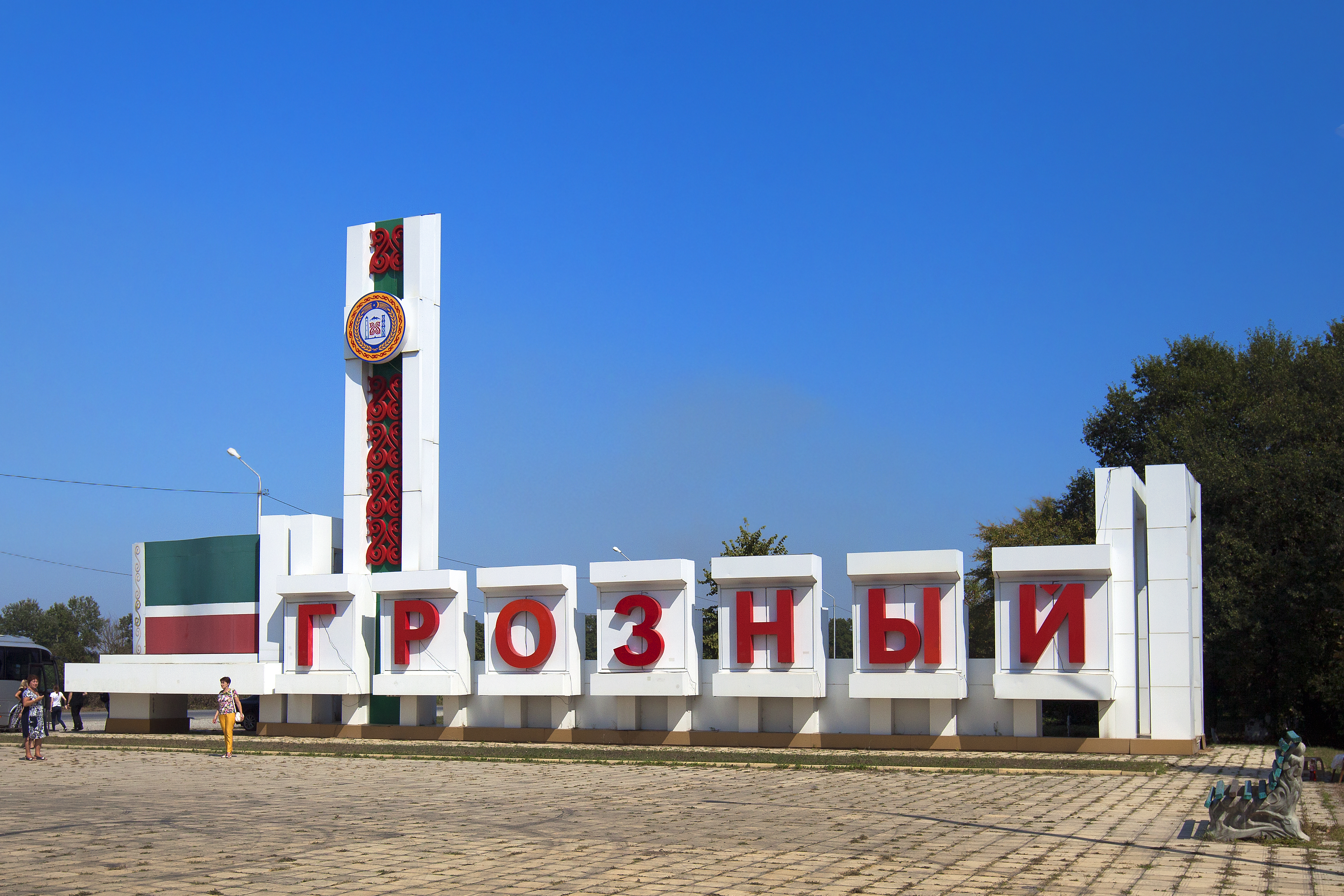
Entrance sign, built in Soviet-times

On 30 November 1922, the mountain republic was dissolved, and the national okrug became the Chechen Autonomous Oblast (Chechen AO) with Grozny as the administrative centre. At this time most of the population was still Russian, but of Cossack descent. As Cossacks were viewed as a potential threat to the Soviet nation, Moscow actively encouraged the migration of Chechens into the city from the mountains. In 1934 the Chechen-Ingush Autonomous Oblast was formed, becoming the Chechen-Ingush ASSR in 1936.

Due to its oil, Grozny with Maykop were the main strategic objectives of the German Fall Blau operation in summer of 1942 (See Battle of the Caucasus).

The failure to take Grozny was a major defeat for Germany and was a factor in holding fast at the Battle of Stalingrad, as that city could have served as a base from which to take Grozny or cut off oil supplies up the Volga River from Astrakhan. The failure to prioritise Grozny, even transferring critical Panzer divisions north to the Siege of Leningrad, was a major factor in Adolf Hitler taking operational level control of the Wehrmacht from his generals who had repeatedly prioritised the two major cities over the oil supplies – against Hitler's express orders. Soviet doctrine however never failed to prioritise the food of Ukraine nor the oil of the Caucasus, which resulted in drastic action after Germany's expulsion/retreat in 1943.

In 1944, the entire population of Chechens and Ingush was deported after being falsely accused of collaborating with advancing armed forces of Nazi Germany. Large numbers of people who were not deemed fit for transport were "liquidated" on the spot, and the adverse situation with transport and the stay in Siberia caused many deaths as well. According to internal NKVD data, a total of 144,704 died in 1944–1948 alone (death rate of 23.5% per all groups). Authors such as Alexander Nekrich, John Dunlop and Moshe Gammer, based on census data from the period estimate a death toll of about 170,000–200,000 among Chechens alone, thus ranging from over a third of the total Chechen population that was deported to nearly half dying during those four years (rates for other groups for those four years hover around 20%). All traces of them in the city, including books and graveyards, were destroyed by the NKVD troops. The act was recognised by the European Parliament as an act of genocide in 2004.

Grozny became the administrative centre of Grozny Oblast of the Russian SFSR, and the city at the time was again wholly Russian. In 1957, the Chechen-Ingush ASSR was restored, and the Chechens were allowed to return. The return of the Chechens to Grozny, which had been lacking of Nakh for thirteen years, would cause massive disruptions to the social, economic and political systems of what had been a Russian city for the period until their return. This caused a self-feeding cycle of ethnic conflict between the two groups, both believing the other's presence in the city was illegitimate. Once again migration of non-Russians into Grozny continued whilst the ethnic Russian population, in turn, moved to other parts of the USSR, notably the Baltic states, after inter-ethnic conflict broke out briefly in 1958.

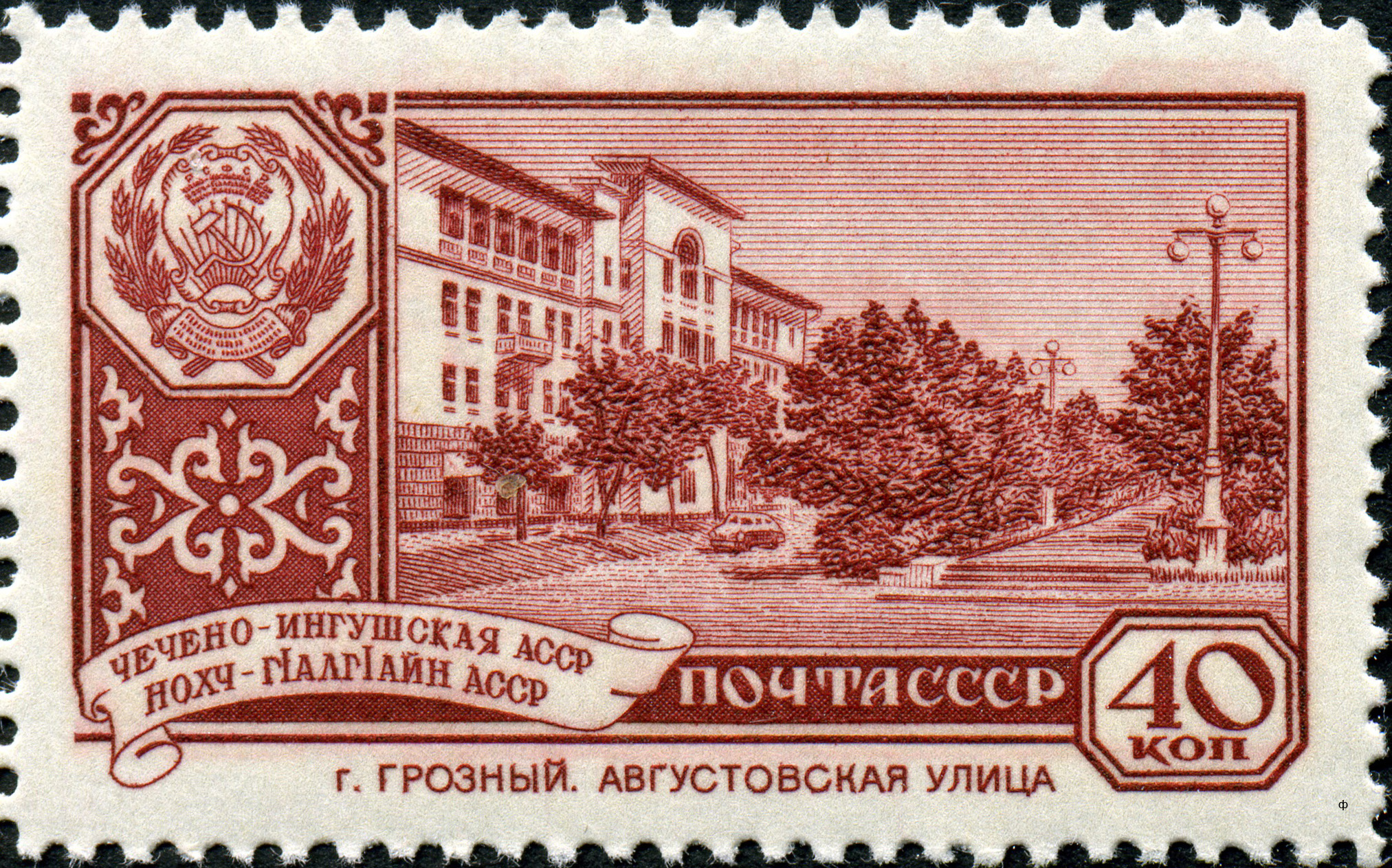
Soviet-era postage stamp with a view of Grozny's Avgustovskaya Street

According to sociologist Georgy Derluguyan, the Checheno-Ingush Republic's economy was divided into two spheres – much like French settler-ruled Algeria – and the Russian sphere had all the jobs with higher salaries, while non-Russians were systematically kept out of all government positions. Russians (as well as Ukrainians and Armenians) worked in education, health, oil, machinery, and social services. Non-Russians (excluding Ukrainians and Armenians) worked in agriculture, construction, a long host of undesirable jobs, as well as the so-called "informal sector" (i.e. illegal, due to the mass discrimination in the legal sector).

At the same time a great deal of development occurred in the city. Like many other Soviet cities, the Stalinist style of architecture was prevalent during this period, with apartments in the centre as well as administrative buildings including the massive Council of Ministers and the Grozny University buildings being constructed in Grozny. Later projects included the high-rise apartment blocks prominent in many Soviet cities, as well as a city airport. In 1989, the population of the city was almost 400,000 people.

=== Collapse of Russian authority ===
After the collapse of the Soviet Union, Grozny became the seat of a separatist government led by Dzhokhar Dudayev. According to some, many of the remaining Russian and other non-Chechen residents fled or were expelled by groups of militants, adding to a harassment and discrimination from the new authorities. These events are perceived by some as an act of an ethnic cleansing of non-Chechens, which has been reflected in the materials of General Prosecutor's office of the Russian Federation.

This view is disputed by authors, such as Russian economists Boris Lvin and Andrei Illarionov, who argue that Russian emigration from the area was no more intense than in other regions of Russia at the time. According to this view of the ethnic situation in Ichkeria, the primary cause of Russian emigration was the extensive bombing of Grozny (where four out of five, or nearly 200,000 Russians in Chechnya lived before the war) by the Russian military during the First Chechen War.

The covert Russian attempts of overthrowing Dudayev by means of armed Chechen opposition forces resulted in repeated failed assaults on the city. Originally, Moscow had been backing the political opposition of Umar Avturkhanov "peacefully" (i.e. without supplying the opposition with weapons and encouraging them to try a coup). However, this changed in 1994, after the coups in neighbouring Georgia and Azerbaijan (both of which Moscow was involved with), when Russia encouraged armed opposition, and occasionally assisted. In August 1994 Avturkhanov attacked Grozny, but was repelled first by Chechen citizens who were then joined by Grozny government troops; Russian helicopters covered his retreat. On 28 September, one of these helicopters was shot down and its Russian pilot was held as a prisoner-of-war by the Chechen government. The last assault, on 26 November 1994, ended with capture of 21 Russian Army tank crew members who had secretly been hired as mercenaries by the FSK (former KGB, not long after renamed FSB); their capture was sometimes cited as one of the reasons for Boris Yeltsin's decision to openly intervene. In the meantime, Grozny airport and other targets were bombed by unmarked Russian aircraft.

=== First Chechen War ===
During the First Chechen War, Grozny was the site of an intense battle lasting from December 1994 to February 1995 and ultimately ending with the capture of the city by the Russian military. Intense fighting and carpet bombing carried out by the Russian Air Force destroyed much of the city. Thousands of combatants on both sides died in the fighting, alongside civilians, many of whom were reportedly ethnic Russians; unclaimed bodies were later collected and buried in mass graves on the city outskirts. The main federal military base in Chechnya was located in the area of Grozny air base.

Chechen guerrilla units operating from nearby mountains managed to harass and demoralise the Russian Army by means of guerilla tactics and raids, such as the attack on Grozny in March 1996, which added to political and public pressure for a withdrawal of Russian troops. In August 1996, a raiding force of 1,500 to 3,000 militants recaptured the city in a surprise attack. They surrounded and routed its entire garrison of 10,000 MVD troops, while fighting off the Russian Army units from the Khankala base. The battle ended with a final ceasefire and Grozny was once again in the hands of Chechen separatists. The name was changed to Djohar in 1997 by the President of the separatist Ichkeria republic, Aslan Maskhadov. By this time most of the remaining Russian minority had fled.

=== Second Chechen War ===
Grozny was once again the epicentre of fighting after the outbreak of the Second Chechen War, which further caused thousands of fatalities. During the early phase of the Russian siege on Grozny on 25 October 1999, Russian forces launched five SS-21 ballistic missiles at the crowded central bazaar and a maternity ward, killing more than 140 people and injuring hundreds. During the massive shelling of the city that followed, most of the Russian artillery were directed toward the upper floors of the buildings; although this caused massive destruction of infrastructure, civilian casualties were much less than in the first battles.

The final seizure of the city was set in early February 2000, when the Russian military lured the besieged militants to a promised safe passage. Seeing no build-up of forces outside, the militants agreed. One day prior to the planned evacuation, the Russian Army mined the path between the city and the village of Alkhan-Kala and concentrated most firepower on that point. As a result, both the city mayor and military commander were killed; a number of other prominent separatist leaders were also killed or wounded. Afterwards, the Russians slowly entered the empty city and on 6 February raised the Russian flag in the centre. Many buildings and even whole areas of the city were systematically destroyed. A month later, it was declared safe to allow the residents to return to their homes, although demolition continued for some time. In 2003, the United Nations called Grozny the most destroyed city on Earth, with not a single building left undamaged.

=== After the wars ===
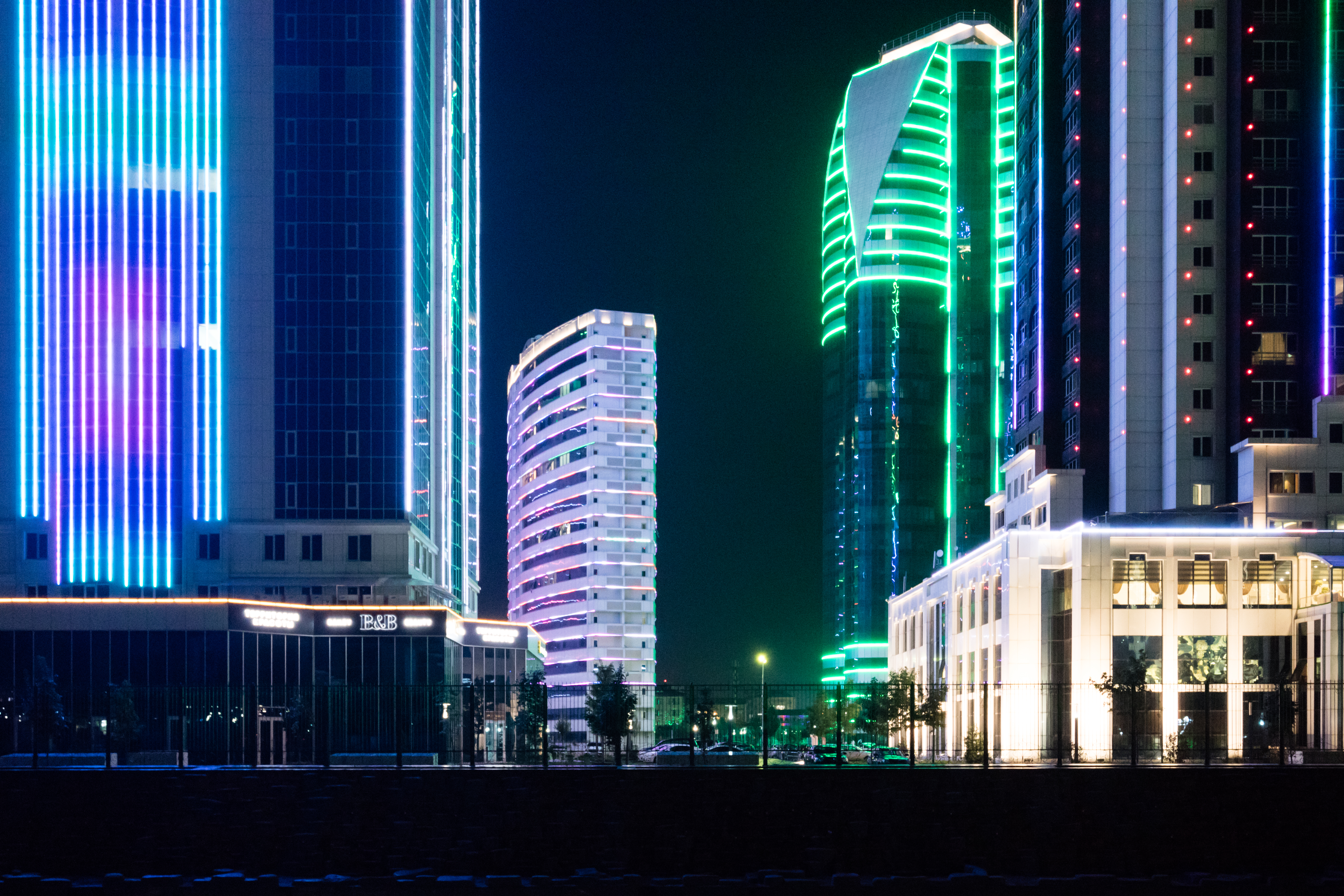
Grozny-City Towers

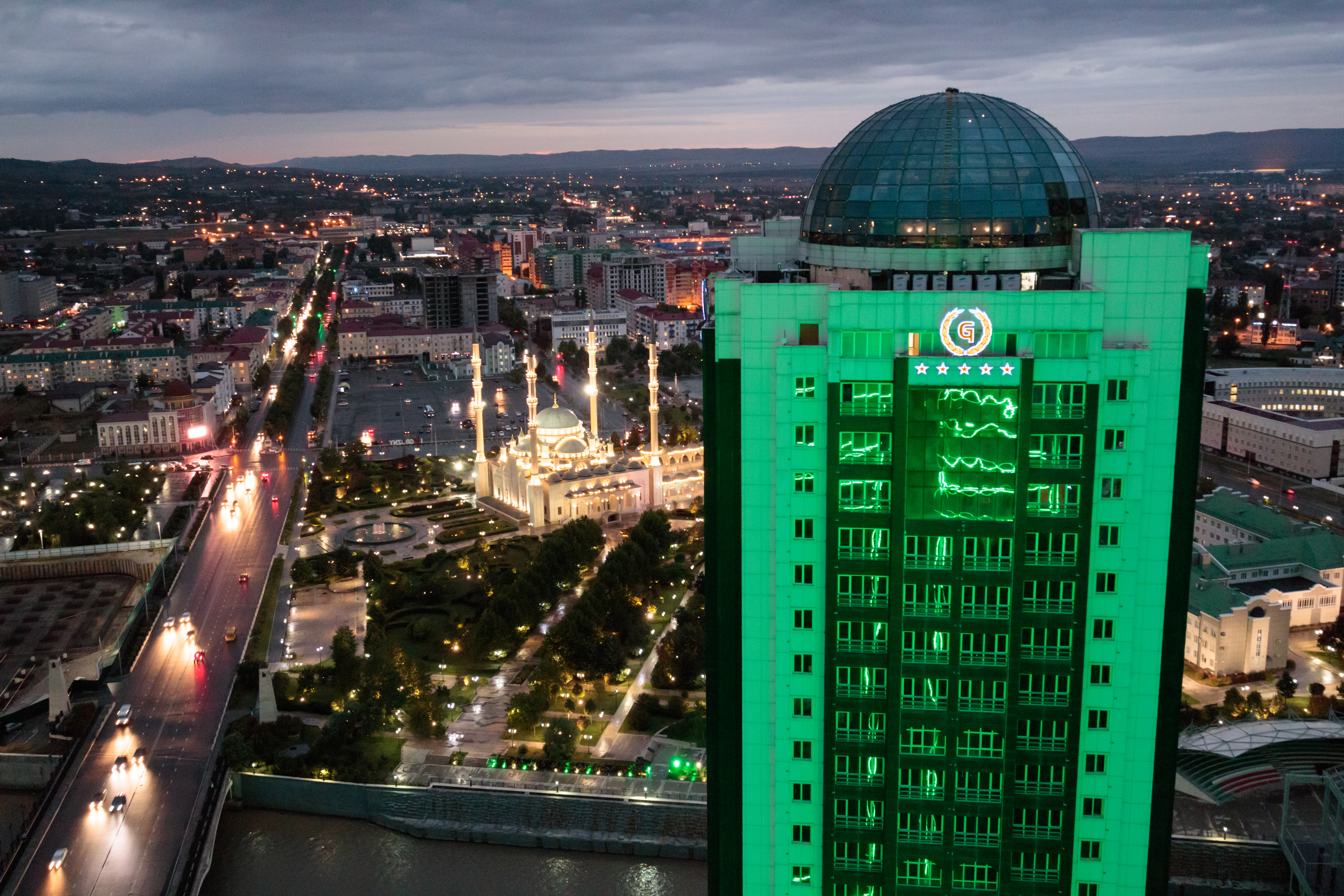
Panoramic view of Grozny from Grozny City Towers

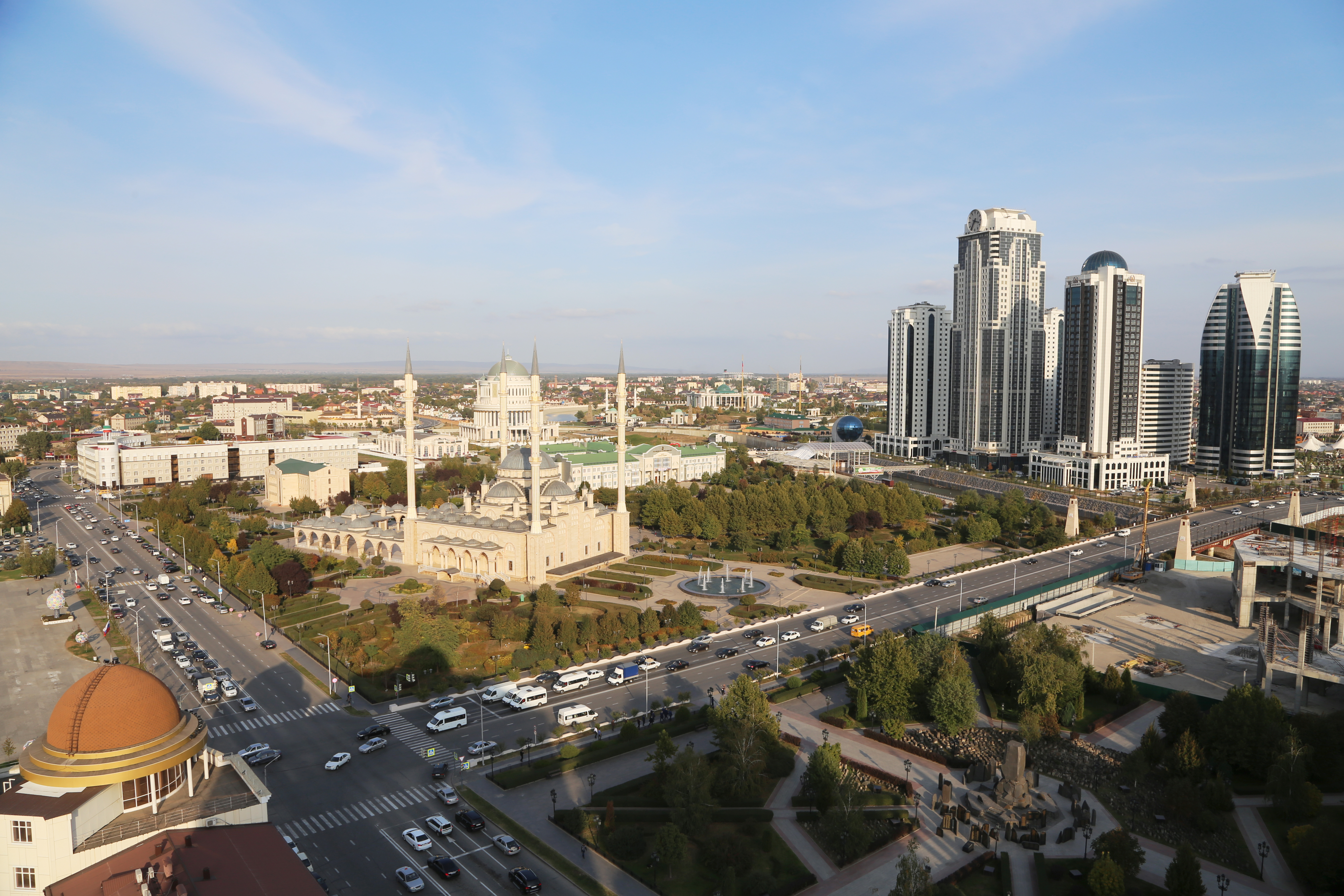
Grozny in 2018

The federal government representatives of Chechnya are based in Grozny. Since 2003, the city has been rebuilt from scratch. Out of several dozens of industrial enterprises, three have been partially rebuilt – the Grozny Machine-Building Factory, the Krasny Molot (Red Hammer) and Transmash factories.

Although most of the city's infrastructure was destroyed during the war, the city's sewage, water, electricity and heating systems have since been repaired, along with 250 kilometres (160 mi) of roads, 13 bridges and some 900 shops. Before the war, Grozny had about 79,000 apartments, and the city authorities expected to be able to restore about 45,000 apartments; the rest were in buildings that were completely destroyed.

Railway connection was restored in 2005, and Grozny's airport was reopened in 2007 with three weekly flights to Moscow. In 2009 the IAC gave Grozny's Severny airport the international certificate after checking and evaluating the airport's airworthiness. On 16 November 2009, the airport had its first international flight, taking pilgrims on Hajj to Saudi Arabia via a Boeing 747.

After four years of construction, the Akhmad Kadyrov Mosque was formally opened to the public on 16 October 2008, and is one of the largest mosques in Europe. In 2009, the city of Grozny was honoured by the UN Human Settlements Programme for transforming the war-scarred city and providing new homes for thousands.

== Administrative and municipal status ==
Historical population
Year	Pop.	±%
1897	16,000	—
1926	70,898	+343.1%
1939	172,448	+143.2%
1959	242,068	+40.4%
1970	341,259	+41.0%
1979	375,326	+10.0%
1989	399,688	+6.5%
2002	210,720	−47.3%
2010	271,573	+28.9%
2021	328,533	+21.0%
2025	399,286	+21.5%
Sources: Census data, estimate

Grozny is the capital of the republic. Within the framework of administrative divisions, it is incorporated as the city of republic significance of Grozny – an administrative unit with the status equal to that of the districts. As a municipal division, the city of republic significance of Grozny is incorporated as Grozny Urban Okrug. The city also serves as the administrative centre of Groznensky Municipal District, but not of the corresponding administrative district.

=== City divisions ===
For administrative purposes, the city is divided into four city districts: Akhmatovsky District, Baysangurovsky District, Visaitovsky District, Sheikh-Mansurovsky District.

== Culture and education ==
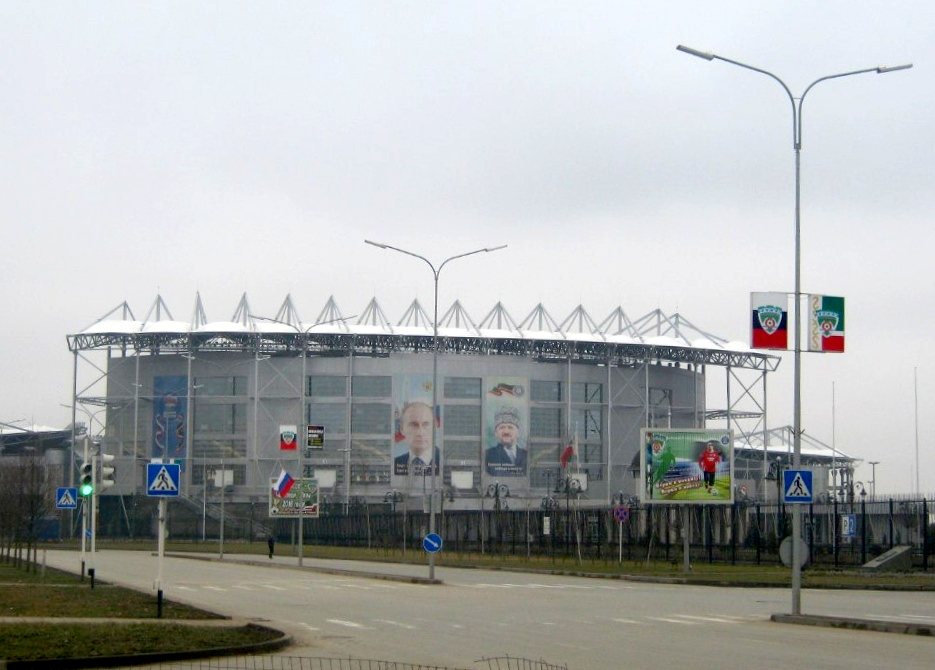
Akhmat Arena

Grozny is known for its modern architecture and as a spa town and although nearly all the town was destroyed or seriously damaged during the Chechen Wars, it has since been entirely rebuilt. It is home to Chechen State University, one of the leading in Russia. The FC Akhmat Grozny, which after a fifteen-year absence from its home town returned to Grozny in March 2008, is the local football club. Also in Grozny is Chechen State Pedagogical Institute and Grozny State Oil Technical University.

The main objects of the cultural life of Grozny are:

- Grozny Russian Drama Theater named after M. Lermontov.
- Chechen State Drama Theater named after Kh. Nuradilov
- Chechen State Theater for Young People
- Chechen State Youth Theater Serlo
- The State Symphony Orchestra of the Chechen Republic
- The National Library of the Chechen Republic
- The Republican Children's Library of the Chechen Republic
- The National Museum of the Chechen Republic
- Chechen State Philharmonic

== Transportation ==
=== Train ===
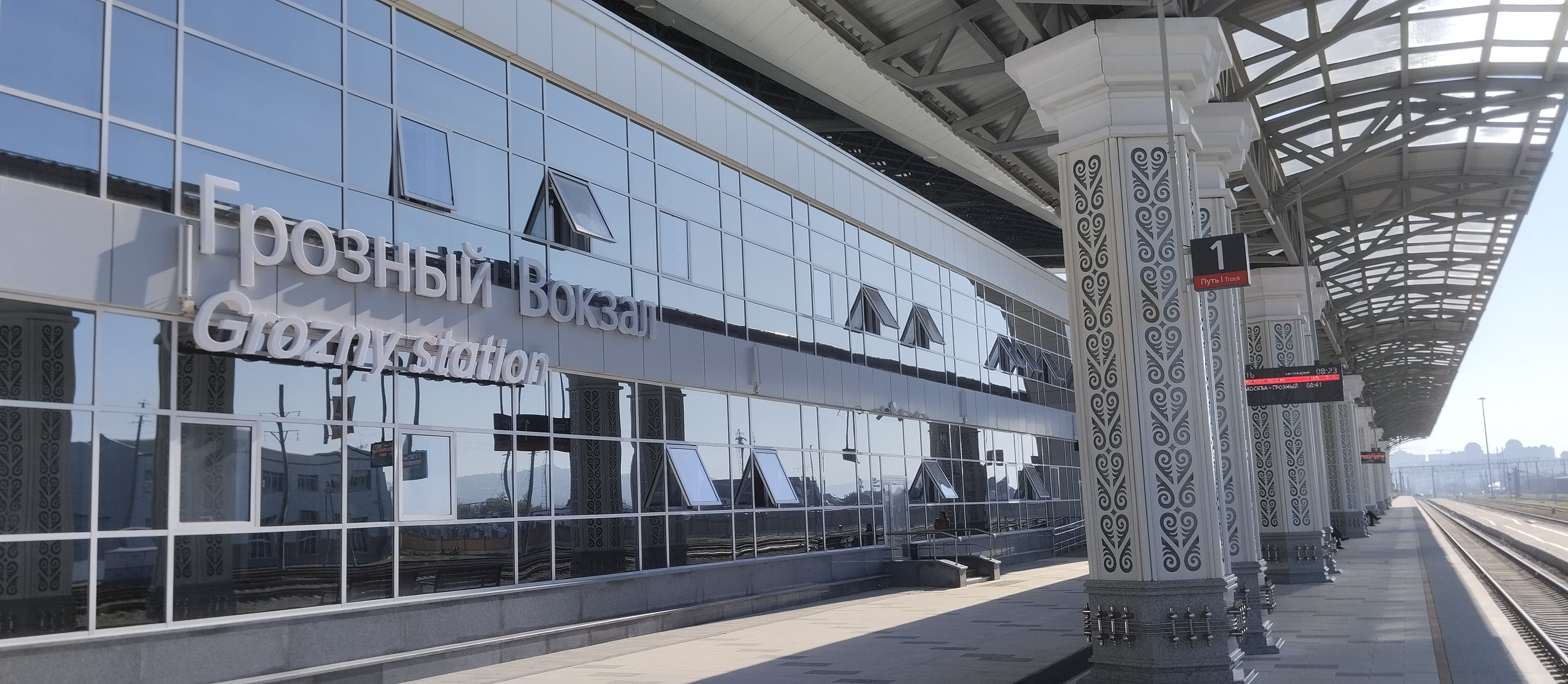
Grozny Railway Station

The first train pulled into the Grozny Railway station on 1 May 1893. It has been running continuously since then.

=== Trams and trolleybuses ===
On 5 November 1932, the Grozny tram system was opened to the public, and by 1990 it was 85-kilometre (53 mi) long, with 107 new Russian-built KTM-5 trams that it received in the late 1980s, and two depots. The Grozny trolleybus system began operation on 31 December 1975, and by 1990 was approximately 60-kilometre (37 mi) long, with 58 buses and one depot. Both types of transport came under difficult pressure in the early 1990s, with frequent theft of equipment, staff not being properly paid and resultant strikes. A major planned trolleybus route extension to the airport was cancelled.

With the outbreak of the First Chechen War both transport services stopped operation in November 1994. During the destructive battles, the tram tracks were blocked or damaged, and cars and buses were turned into barricades. The trolleybus system was luckier, as most of its equipment, including the depot, survived the war. In 1996 it was visited by specialists from the Vologda Trolleybus Company, who repaired some of the lines, with services planned to restart in 1997. However, after specialists left, most of the equipment was stolen. The surviving buses were transported to Volzhsky where they were repaired and used on the new trolleybus system there.

After the Second Chechen War, little of the infrastructure of either system was left. The Ministry of Transport of the Chechen Republic, created in 2002, decided not to rebuild the tram system (considered too expensive and no longer meeting the city's needs, as it had by then lost half of its population). Rebuilding of the trolleybus system, however, is still under consideration.

=== Airport ===
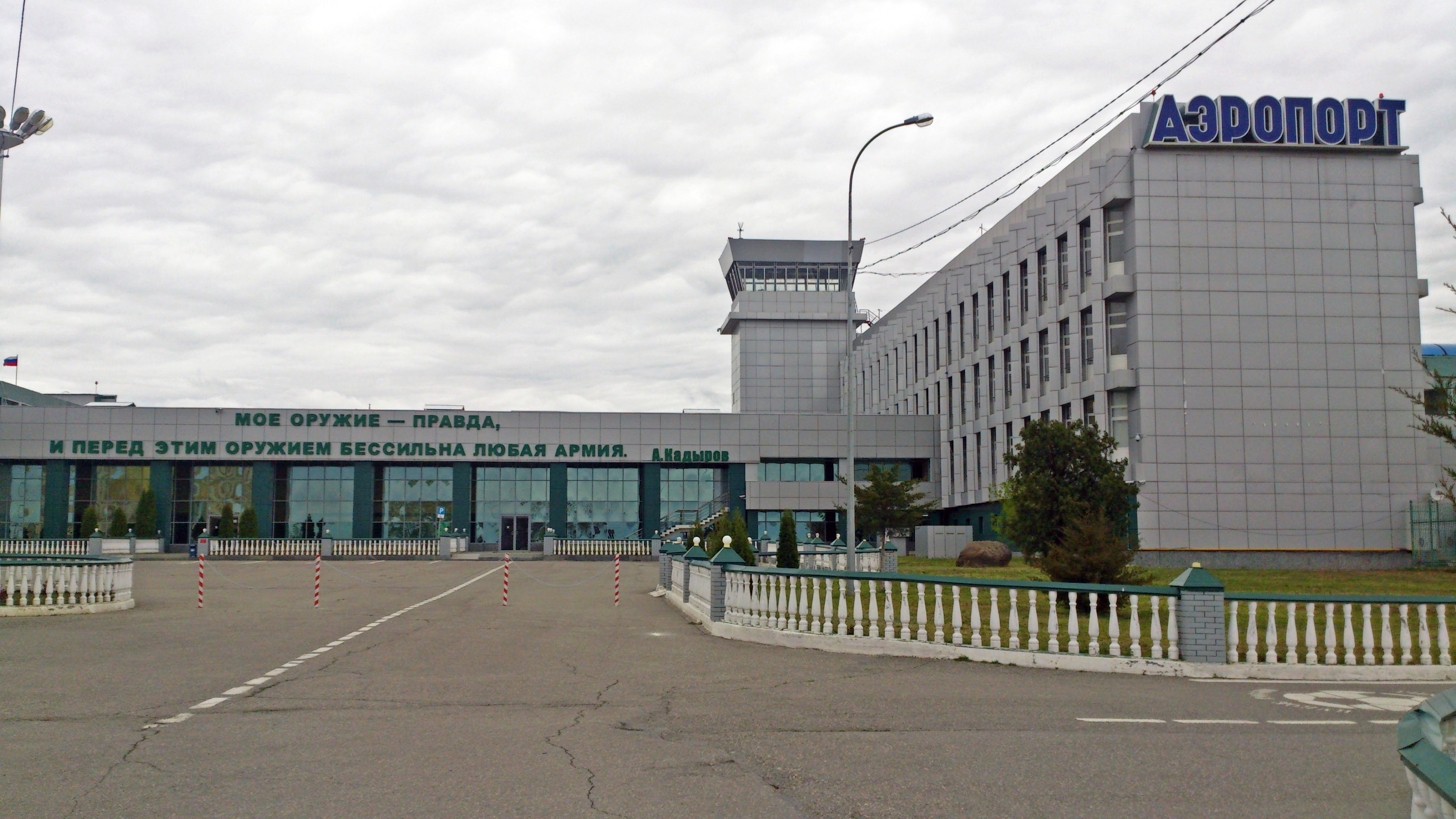
Grozny Airport

The city is served by Grozny Airport.

=== Sharing system ===
In 2018 the Delimobil car sharing company officially provided the capital of the Chechen Republic with 30 Hyundai Solaris. To drive the automobiles, the user has to book them through the app of the owning company.

In the same year the Delisamokat provided the city with 120 electric scooters and some scooter stations.

== Sports ==
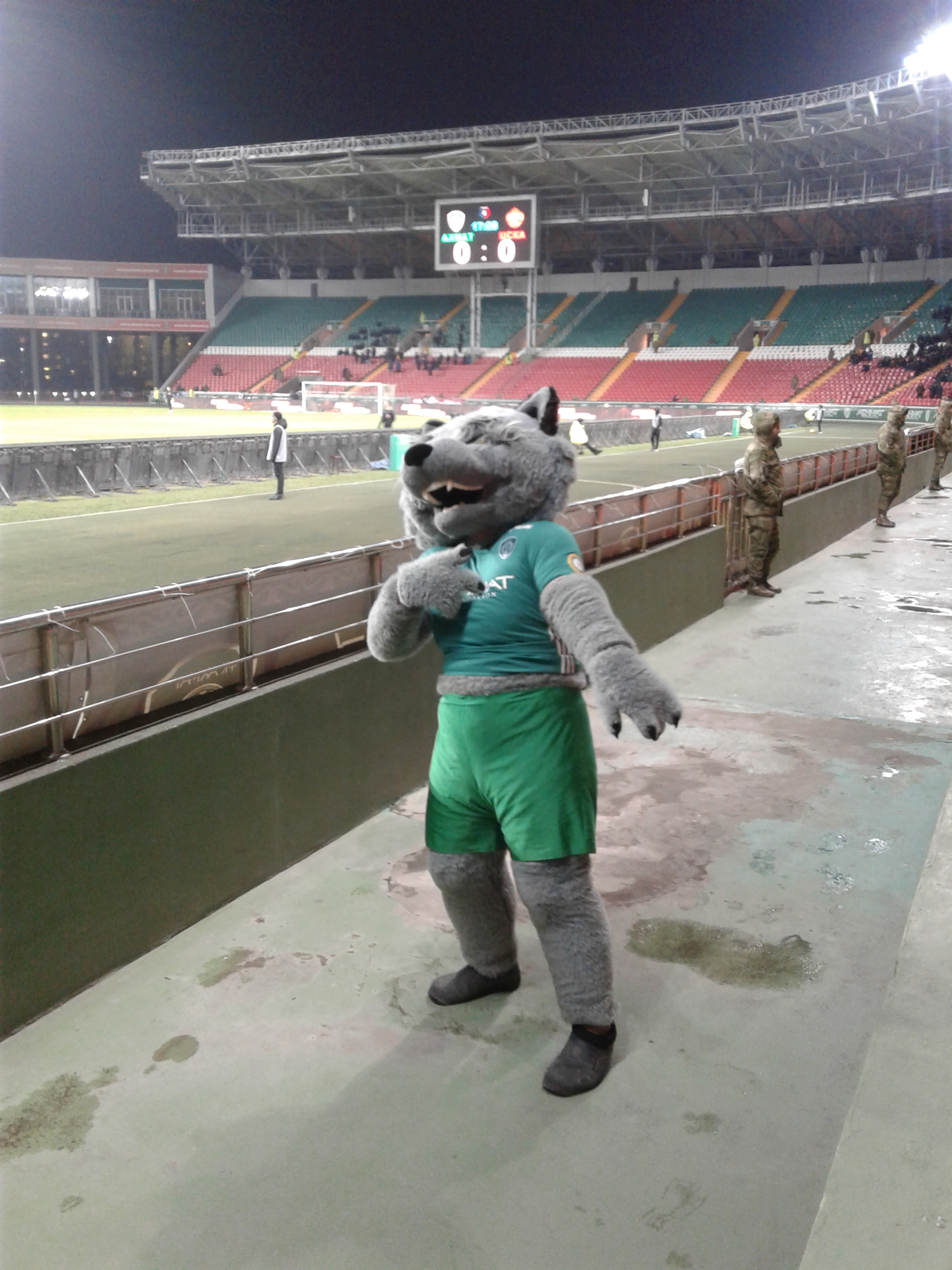
The mascot of FC Akhmat Grozny

Grozny is home to Russian Football Premier League club FC Akhmat Grozny. After winning promotion by coming 2nd in the Russian First Division in 2007, Akhmat Grozny finished 10th in the Russian Premier League in 2008. The team still plays in the top tier. The club is owned by Ramzan Kadyrov and plays in the recently built city's Akhmat Stadium.

The city is also home to the Fort Grozny motor racing circuit, which opened in 2015.

== Geography ==
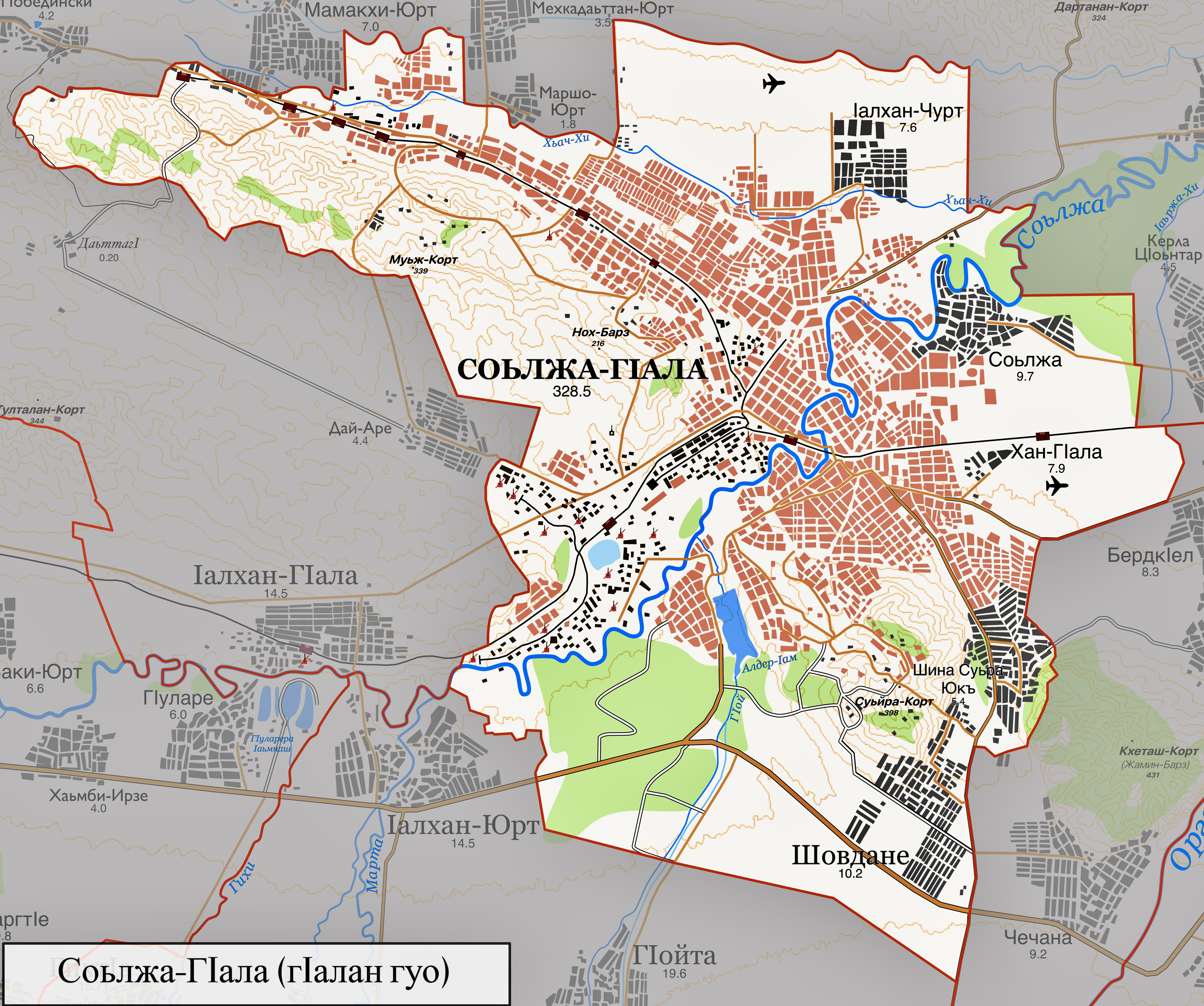
Map of the Grozny urban district (in Chechen)

The city is located along the Sunzha River, a major tributary of the Terek River. The city is located in a valley approximately 80 kilometres (50 miles) north of the main range of the Greater Caucasus Mountains.

=== Climate ===
Grozny has a humid continental climate (Köppen Dfa) with hot summers and cold winters. Precipitation peaks during early summer, where sunshine hours also peak.

Climate data for Grozny (1991–2020 normals, extremes 1938–present)
Month	Jan	Feb	Mar	Apr	May	Jun	Jul	Aug	Sep	Oct	Nov	Dec	Year
Record high °C (°F)	15.7 (60.3)	22.3 (72.1)	32.9 (91.2)	33.7 (92.7)	38.1 (100.6)	39.1 (102.4)	42.0 (107.6)	41.4 (106.5)	40.7 (105.3)	32.5 (90.5)	23.7 (74.7)	20.2 (68.4)	42.0 (107.6)
Mean daily maximum °C (°F)	2.3 (36.1)	3.7 (38.7)	10.1 (50.2)	17.3 (63.1)	23.2 (73.8)	28.2 (82.8)	30.8 (87.4)	30.6 (87.1)	25.1 (77.2)	17.2 (63.0)	8.8 (47.8)	3.5 (38.3)	16.7 (62.1)
Daily mean °C (°F)	−1.5 (29.3)	−0.6 (30.9)	4.7 (40.5)	10.8 (51.4)	16.7 (62.1)	21.4 (70.5)	23.9 (75.0)	23.6 (74.5)	18.5 (65.3)	11.6 (52.9)	4.5 (40.1)	0.1 (32.2)	11.1 (52.0)
Mean daily minimum °C (°F)	−4.2 (24.4)	−3.7 (25.3)	0.8 (33.4)	5.7 (42.3)	11.5 (52.7)	15.9 (60.6)	18.2 (64.8)	17.9 (64.2)	13.4 (56.1)	7.3 (45.1)	1.4 (34.5)	−2.5 (27.5)	6.8 (44.2)
Record low °C (°F)	−31.5 (−24.7)	−30.8 (−23.4)	−19.1 (−2.4)	−7.6 (18.3)	−3.1 (26.4)	5.6 (42.1)	9.2 (48.6)	5.0 (41.0)	−2.7 (27.1)	−9.6 (14.7)	−23.5 (−10.3)	−26.6 (−15.9)	−31.5 (−24.7)
Average precipitation mm (inches)	29 (1.1)	24 (0.9)	34 (1.3)	43 (1.7)	67 (2.6)	84 (3.3)	53 (2.1)	48 (1.9)	48 (1.9)	51 (2.0)	36 (1.4)	33 (1.3)	550 (21.7)
Average precipitation days (≥ 1.0 mm)	4.9	5.2	4.9	5.1	7.2	8.0	6.2	5.7	4.6	5.9	5.8	6.3	69.8
Mean monthly sunshine hours	59	67	104	167	219	242	247	234	186	136	68	49	1,778
Source 1: Погода и Климат
Source 2: NOAA (sunshine and precipitation days 1961–1990)

== Visitor attractions ==
- Akhmad Kadyrov Mosque
- Grozny-City Towers Facade Clocks

== Twin towns – sister cities ==
Grozny is twinned with:

- Ardahan, Turkey
- Baku, Azerbaijan
- Comrat, Moldova
- Sivas, Turkey
- (Georgia (country)) Tbilisi, Georgia

Former twin towns:

- Warsaw, Poland (from 1997 to 2022, status terminated as a result of the 2022 Russian invasion of Ukraine)

== Notable people ==
- Anatoly Karatsuba (1937–2008), mathematician
- Artur Sarkisov (born 1987), former Armenian soccer player
- Bekkhan Agayev (born 1975), political figure
- Gennady Troshev (1947–2008), colonel general
- Israil Arsamakov (born 1962), weightlifter
- Khassan Baiev (born 1963), surgeon
- Ludmilla Tourischeva (born 1952), Olympic gymnast
- Lyudmila Rudakova (1937–2026), ballerina
- Makka Sagaipova (born 1987), singer and dancer
- Maksharip Muzhukhoev (1942–2015), historian (dr. of historical sciences), archeologist
- Mamed Khalidov (born 1980), mixed martial arts fighter
- Zubaira Tukhugov (born 1991), mixed martial arts fighter
- Khamzat Chimaev (born 1994), mixed martial arts fighter
- Magomed Adiyev (born 1977), soccer coach
- Magomed Ozdoyev (born 1992), soccer player
- Meseda Bagaudinova (born 1983), pop singer
- Pasikhat Dzhukalaeva (1881–2005), supercentenarian
- Sukhrab Akhmedov (born 1974), colonel
- Timur Aliev (born 1973), journalist
- Timur Eneev (1924–2019), mathematician
- Yuliya Yefimova (born 1992), swimmer
- Yuri Radonyak (1935–2013), boxer
- Zelim Bakaev (born 1992), singer
- Natalia Estemirova (1958–2009), human rights activist

== See also ==
- Jewish Quarter of Grozny
- Church of Saint Michael the Archangel in Grozny

== Sources ==
- Совет депутатов города Грозного. Решение №02 от 27 марта 2013 г. «Устав муниципального образования "городской округ "город Грозный"», в ред. Решения №54 от 26 сентября 2013 г. (Council of Deputies of the City of Grozny. Decision #02 of March 27, 2013 Charter of the Municipal Formation of the "Urban Okrug of "the City of Grozny", as amended by the Decision #54 of September 26, 2013. ).
- Президент Чеченской Республики. Указ №500 от 30 ноября 2005 г. «Об утверждении перечня субъектов административно-территориального устройства Чеченской Республики». Вступил в силу 30 ноября 2005 г.. Опубликован: База данных "Консультант-плюс". (President of the Chechen Republic. Decree #500 of November 30, 2005 On Adopting the List of the Entities Within the Administrative-Territorial Structure of the Chechen Republic. Effective as of November 30, 2005.).
- Референдум. 23 марта 2003 г. «Конституция Чеченской Республики», в ред. Конституционного закона №1-РКЗ от 30 сентября 2014 г. «О внесении изменений в Конституцию Чеченской Республики». Вступил в силу со дня официального опубликования по результатам голосования на референдуме Чеченской Республики. (Referendum. March 23, 2003 Constitution of the Chechen Republic, as amended by the Constitutional Law #1-RKZ of September 30, 2014 On Amending the Constitution of the Chechen Republic. Effective as of the day of the official publication in accordance with the results of the referendum of the Chechen Republic.).
- Парламент Чеченской Республики. Закон №44-РЗ от 14 июля 2008 г. «Об образовании муниципального образования город Грозный, установлении его границы и наделении его статусом городского округа», в ред. Закона №21-РЗ от 28 июня 2010 г «О внесении изменений в некоторые законодательные акты Чеченской Республики». Вступил в силу по истечении 10 дней после официального опубликования. Опубликован: "Вести Республики", №162 (844), 26 августа 2008 г. (Parliament of the Chechen Republic. Law #44-RZ of July 14, 2008 On Establishing the Municipal Formation of the City of Grozny, on Establishing Its Border, and on Granting It the Status of an Urban Okrug, as amended by the Law #21-RZ of June 28, 2010 On Amending Several Legislative Acts of the Chechen Republic. Effective as of after 10 days from the official publication date have passed.).
- Парламент Чеченской Республики. Закон №12-РЗ от 20 февраля 2009 г. «Об образовании муниципального образования Грозненский район и муниципальных образований, входящих в его состав, установлении их границ и наделении их соответствующим статусом муниципального района и сельского поселения», в ред. Закона №21-РЗ от 28 июня 2010 г «О внесении изменений в некоторые законодательные акты Чеченской Республики». Вступил в силу по истечении 10 дней после официального опубликования. Опубликован: "Вести Республики", №33 (965), 25 февраля 2009 г. (Parliament of the Chechen Republic. Law #12-RZ of February 20, 2009 On Establishing the Municipal Formation of Groznensky District and the Municipal Formations Comprising It, on Establishing Their Borders, and on Granting Them the Status of a Municipal District and Rural Settlement, as amended by the Law #21-RZ of June 28, 2010 On Amending Various Legislative Acts of the Chechen Republic. Effective as of after 10 days from the official publication date have passed.).
- Olga Oliker, Russia's Chechen Wars 1994–2000: Lessons from Urban Combat. (Santa Monica CA: RAND Arroyo Center, 2001)
