= Mikhail Gudkov =

Russian general (1983–2025)

- Михаил Гудков
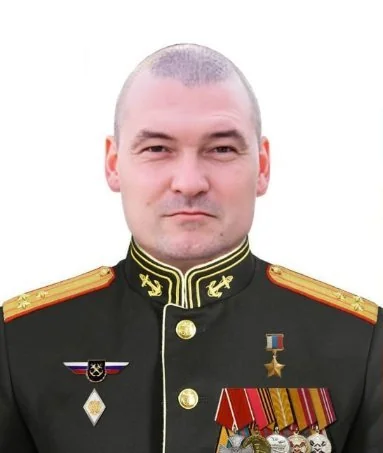
- Gudkov in 2022
- Born: 11 January 1983; Novosibirsk, Russian SFSR, Soviet Union
- Died: 2 July 2025 (aged 42); Korenevsky District, Kursk Oblast, Russia
- Military career
- Allegiance: Russia
- Branch: Russian Navy
- Service years: 2000–2025
- Rank: Major general
- Nicknames: Varyag (Варяг, lit. Varangian)
- Commands: 155th Guards Naval Infantry Brigade
- Conflicts: Second Chechen War; Syrian Civil War; Russian intervention; Russo-Ukrainian war †; Battle of Bucha; Battle of Irpin; Battle of Hostomel; Battle of Vuhledar; Kursk offensive
- Awards: Hero of the Russian Federation (2023, 2025)

Mikhail Yevgenyevich Gudkov (Russian: Михаил Евгеньевич Гудков; 11 January 1983 – 2 July 2025) was a Russian major general who served as Deputy Commander-in-Chief of the Russian Navy from March 2025 until his death. He had previously held the position of commander of the 155th Guards Naval Infantry Brigade of the Pacific Fleet. He was killed by a Ukrainian missile strike in Kursk Oblast during the Russo-Ukrainian war.

== Biography ==
Gudkov was born on 11 January 1983 in Novosibirsk, Russia. He enlisted in the Russian Armed Forces in 2000. Gudkov graduated from the Novosibirsk Higher Military Command School (faculty "Application of Military Intelligence Units") in 2005, and was assigned to the Russian Airborne Forces the same year. He was assigned to the 83rd Separate Air Assault Brigade headquartered in Ussuriysk, Primorsky Krai, and participated in military operations in the North Caucasus during the Second Chechen War.

Gudkov rose from commander of a paratrooper platoon to commander of an air assault battalion. Upon his graduation from the Combined Arms Academy of the Armed Forces of the Russian Federation, Gudkov was appointed deputy commander of the 155th Independent Marine Brigade, part of the Pacific Fleet, in Vladivostok, Primorsky Krai. He took part in the Russian military intervention in Syria.

=== Russo-Ukrainian War ===
As commander of the 155th Independent Marine Brigade, Gudkov participated in the Russian invasion of Ukraine beginning in 2022. He was awarded the title of Hero of the Russian Federation in 2023 and was promoted to major general in 2024. In March 2025, Gudkov was named Deputy Commander-in-Chief of the Russian Navy. President Vladimir Putin announced Gudkov's appointment at meeting with the crew of the nuclear submarine Arkhangelsk. Putin praised Gudkov on the occasion, saying that the 155th Marine Brigade under his command was an elite unit and one of the best Russia had. In his new role, Gudkov was in charge of the Russian Navy’s entire naval infantry and all coastal missile and artillery troops.

==== Alleged war crimes in Bucha ====
Gudkov and his subordinates were accused by Ukrainian authorities of committing multiple war crimes during Russia’s full-scale invasion of Ukraine. The 155th Naval Infantry Brigade, under Gudkov's leadership during the early phase of the invasion, was linked by Ukrainian authorities and independent media to atrocities committed in Bucha, a suburb of Kyiv where mass civilian killings were documented following the Russian retreat. The Insider reports that Gudkov continued to exercise operational control over the brigade and that Ukrainian authorities accused the unit of committing war crimes in Bucha, Irpin, and Hostomel. Firstpost likewise states that the 155th Brigade, previously commanded by Gudkov, was linked to mass civilian killings in Bucha during the initial weeks of the conflict.

==== Death ====
On 2 July 2025, Gudkov was killed by a Ukrainian missile strike in Russia's Kursk Oblast. His death was announced by the governor of Primorsky Krai, Oleg Kozhemyako, on 3 July. According to Russian and Ukrainian Telegram channels, Gudkov and ten other officers died in a Ukrainian strike on a command post near the town of Korenevo, around 30 kilometres (19 mi) from the Ukrainian border. The Russian Defense Ministry confirmed on 3 July that Gudkov had been killed the previous day while on a combat mission in a border district of Kursk Oblast. He was posthumously declared a Hero of the Russian Federation, becoming the first person in recent history to be awarded the title twice. Gudkov is one of the most senior Russian military officers to have been killed since the full-scale invasion of Ukraine in 2022.

== Awards ==
- Hero of the Russian Federation (2023)
- Two Orders of Courage
- Zhukov Medal
- Medals of the Ministry of Defense of the Russian Federation.
- Hero of Primorye

== Commemoration ==
- In Novosibirsk, a memorial plaque was installed on the building of lyceum No. 81, where Gudkov studied, in 2024.
- The 155th Independent Guards Kursk Marine Brigade of the Pacific Fleet, bearing the Orders of Zhukov and Suvorov, was awarded the honorary title "named after twice Hero of the Russian Federation Major General M. E. Gudkov".
- A monument is planned to be erected in Kursk.

== See also ==
- List of Russian generals killed during the Russian invasion of Ukraine
