= Sukhrab Akhmedov =

Russian naval officer (born 1974)

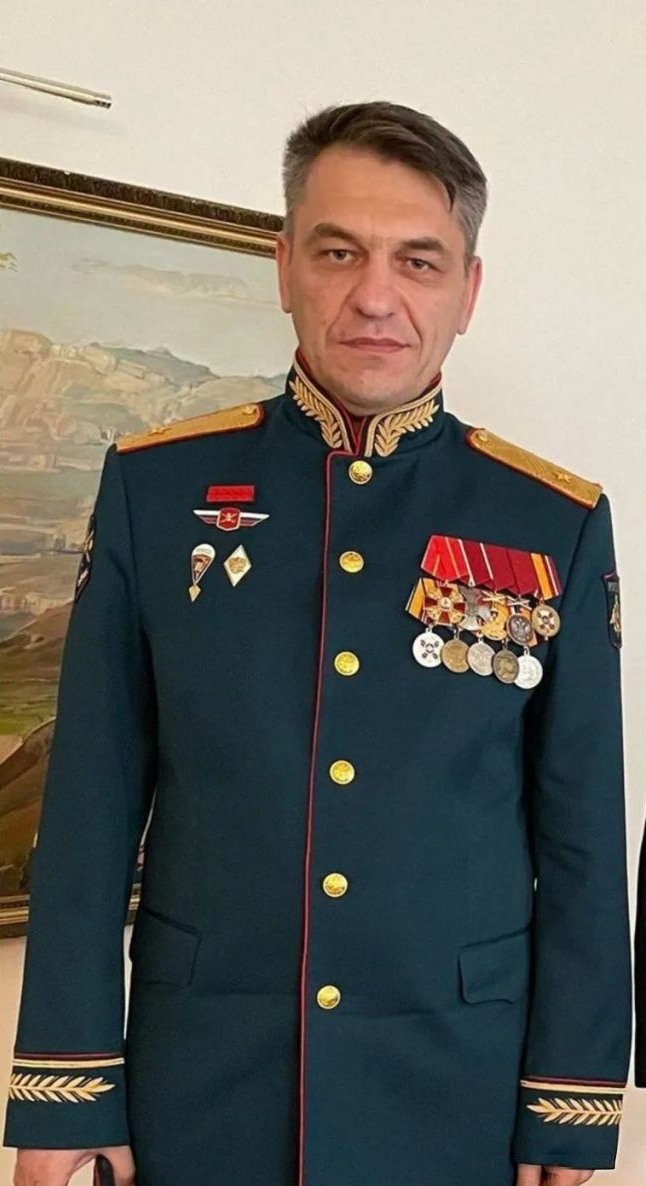
Sukhrab Akhmedov

Sukhrab Sultanovich Akhmedov (Russian: Сухраб Султанович Ахмедов; born 23 December 1974) is an officer in the Russian Armed Forces. He held the rank of major general and commanded the 20th Combined Arms Army until May 2024.

== Personal life and education ==
Akhmedov was born in 1974 in Grozny, in the Checheno-Ingush ASSR, though with origins from Palisma, Dagestan. He graduated from the Novosibirsk Higher Military Command School in 1996, starting his military service in Novosibirsk. In 2005, he graduated from the Combined Arms Academy of the Armed Forces of the Russian Federation in Moscow. Akhmedov is married to Margarita Vladimirovna and has three children, two daughters and a son.

== Career ==
Between 2010 and 2011, he served under the command of the Eastern Military District, before being appointed head of the district's combat training department. He held this position until 2014, after which he was appointed deputy commander of the Pacific Fleet's coastal troops. In this role, he participated in the Syrian civil war as part of the Russian contingent supporting the government of Bashar al-Assad.

In 2017, he began his final postgraduate training at the Academy of the General Staff of the Russian Federation. Subsequently, in 2019, he was appointed commander of the 155th Separate Marine Brigade. Two years later, he was promoted to deputy commander of the Pacific Fleet's Northeastern Forces.

During the Russian invasion of Ukraine from 2022, he was commander of the Pacific Fleet's coastal troops in Ukraine. The brigades was employed in the Battle of Vuhledar, where Russian forces took heavy losses. Following the campaign, complaints surfaced from surviving marines that poor military leadership was a cause of the enormous losses. Public information surfaced in December 2022 that Akhmedov could be removed from his position as a result. Following these rumors, Russian high command discounted the allegations of leadership inadequacies and failures from November, and by December, Novaya Gazeta reported that they had information that Akmedov would be promoted.

By June 2023, Akmedov had been promoted to major general and given command of the 20th Combined Arms Army. Russian sources reported that a division of the 20th had suffered about 200 casualties (100 killed, 100 wounded) in June 2023 from Ukrainian artillery while they were assembled together near Kreminna for two hours waiting for Akhmedov to deliver a motivational speech. He was heavily criticized for this by Russian military bloggers, including a call for responsible commanders to be shot in front of their formations for such failures.

In May 2024, Akhmedov was removed from his post as the commander of 20th army.
