= Novotroitskoye, Blagoveshchensky District, Amur Oblast =

Novotroitskoye Новотроицкое
- Selo
- Location within Amur Oblast Location within Russia
- Coordinates: 50°29′N 127°33′E
- Country: Russia
- Region: Amur Oblast
- District: Blagoveshchensky District
- Time zone: UTC+9:00

Novotroitskoye (Russian: Новотроицкое) is a rural locality (a selo) and the administrative center of Novotroitsky Selsoviet of Blagoveshchensky District, Amur Oblast, Russia. The population was 897 as of 2018. There are 24 streets.

== Geography ==
Novotroitskoye is located 29 km north of Blagoveshchensk (the district's administrative centre) by road. Belogorye is the nearest rural locality.
