= 155th Guards Naval Infantry Brigade =

Russian Naval Infantry brigade

155th Separate Guards Kursk Orders of Zhukov and Suvorov Naval Infantry Brigade named after twice Hero of the Russian Federation Major General M.E. Gudkov
- 155-я отдельная гвардейская Курская орденов Жукова и Суворова бригада морской пехоты имени дважды Героя Российской Федерации генерал-майора М.Е.Гудкова
- Active: December 1, 2009 – December 1, 2025
- Country: Russia
- Branch: Russian Navy
- Type: Naval infantry and Naval special forces
- Size: Brigade
- Part of: Pacific Fleet
- Garrison/HQ: Vladivostok, Slavyanka (Primorsky Krai)
- Patron: Mikhail Gudkov
- Color of Beret: Black
- Engagements: Russo-Ukrainian war (2022–present); 2022 Russian invasion of Ukraine; Northern Ukraine campaign; Eastern Ukraine campaign; Battle of Vuhledar; Kursk campaign
- Decorations: Guards; Order of Zhukov; Order of Suvorov
- Battle honours: Kursk

Commanders
- Notable commanders: Mikhail Gudkov †

Insignia
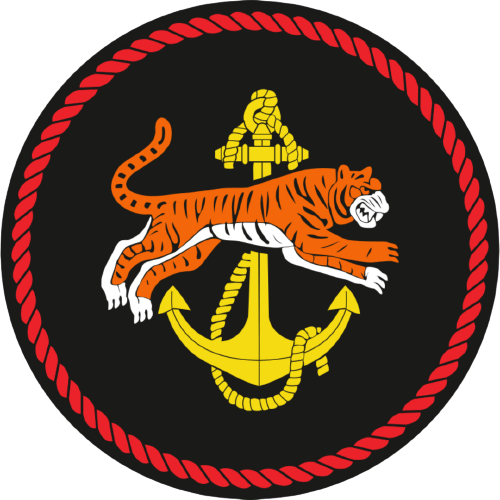
- Former sleeve patch

The 155th Separate Guards Kursk Orders of Zhukov and Suvorov Naval Infantry Brigade named after twice Hero of the Russian Federation Major General M.E. Gudkov (Russian: 155-я отдельная гвардейская Курская орденов Жукова и Суворова бригада морской пехоты имени дважды Героя Российской Федерации генерал-майора М.Е.Гудкова) was a brigade-sized formation of the Russian Naval Infantry. It is located in the city of Vladivostok and the village of Slavyanka, Primorsky Krai. It was part of the Pacific Fleet. In Western sources the title is sometimes translated as "Marines." On December 1, 2025, the brigade was reformed into the 55th Guards Naval Infantry Division, though some assessments suggested that the division would likely not be "fully staffed" until the current war with Ukraine was concluded.

Since the 2022 Russian invasion of Ukraine, the brigade has taken part in the Russo-Ukrainian War, where it has fought near Kyiv, Pavlivka, Avdiivka, and Vuhledar. During its deployment to Ukraine, the unit has suffered heavy losses, with the Institute for the Study of War reporting that the brigade had been destroyed and reconstituted eight times by March 2023.

The unit has been accused of numerous war crimes in Ukraine, including beheading Ukrainian soldiers and executing prisoners of war.

== History ==
The 155th Separate Naval Infantry Brigade was created on December 1, 2009, by reorganizing the 55th Naval Infantry Division, which was created in 1968.

=== Involvement in Syria ===
During the Russian intervention in Syria, the 155th brigade provided support and cover to the PKS aviation group as part of the Permanent Operational Unit of the Russian Navy.

=== Russo-Ukrainian War ===
Following the 2022 Russian invasion of Ukraine, the brigade took part in the Russo-Ukrainian War.

On March 13, in a written post on Facebook, Ukrainian journalist Roman Tsymbalyuk reported that units of the 155th Separate Marine Brigade had suffered losses consisting of "about 600 servicemen killed and as many wounded" in the Chernihiv region.

On March 19, the General Staff of the Armed Forces of Ukraine reported that separate units of the 155th Separate Naval Infantry Brigade and the 40th Naval Infantry Brigade (Petropavlovsk-Kamchatsky) were transferred to the territory of Belarus to replace the losses of the Eastern Military District.

On March 28, President Putin assigned the brigade the rank of guards, at the same time as the 126th Coastal Defense Brigade.

In early November 2022, there were reports of heavy losses in the brigade in battles in the Pavlivka area near Vuhledar in the Donetsk region. On November 3, marines of the 155th brigade posted a letter to the Telegram channel of Russian governor Oleg Kozhemyako, describing how they were "thrown into an incomprehensible offensive by General Muradov" and disclose that "about 300 people were killed, wounded, or went missing in 4 days" as a result of the offensive. Additionally, the marines asked for an independent investigation into the matter, not associated with the Ministry of Defense. Reportedly, 63 marines were killed and another 240 casualties suffered during the assault, with half of the 155th and 40th Marine Brigade's equipment being lost, including "scores of scores of T-80 tanks and BMP and BTR fighting vehicles". By late November 2022, the 155th Brigade was reportedly losing a hundred people a day during the assault on Pavlivka.

In early February 2023, the 155th brigade again suffered heavy losses during the offensive on Vuhledar. Video recordings of one combat encounter show nearly 30 Russian combat vehicles being destroyed, including 13 tanks and 12 BMPs. According to the Institute for the Study of War, the footage shows Russian forces engaging in "highly dysfunctional" combat tactics, which is likely an indication that the 155th brigade is made up of poorly trained, freshly mobilized soldiers.

On March 24, 2023, the ISW reported that the brigade had been destroyed and reconstituted eight times so far, including at Vuhledar, where the Ukrainians claimed the entire brigade of 5,000 troops was destroyed.

On May 17, 2023, the brigade was awarded the Order of Zhukov.

On February 27, 2024, a HIMARS strike killed 19 Russian soldiers from the 155th Naval Infantry Brigade including a colonel and 2 other ranking officers. The unit commander was also wounded.

On October 18, 2024, the Ukrainian 95th Air Assault Brigade killed 30 personnel and destroyed three APCs from the 155th Brigade in an engagement in Kursk Oblast.

On January 23, 2025, the brigade was awarded the Order of Suvorov.

On February 2, 2025, the leader of the "Tigir" Battalion Sergey Yefremov was killed by Ukrainian forces in Kursk Oblast.

On February 21, 2025, the brigade received the honorary designation "Kursk".

On May 30, 2025, a source with Ukraine's military intelligence agency claimed responsibility for two explosions near Desantnaya Bay in Vladivostok. Targeting the command post and barracks of the 47th Assault Battalion of the 155th Guards Marine Brigade. The Russian Anti-Terrorist Commission of Primorsky Krai claimed the explosion was caused by “propane-butane cylinders” igniting.

On July 3, 2025, Deputy Commander-in-Chief of the Russian Navy Mikhail Gudkov, former commander of the 155th who was promoted in March, was killed by a missile strike in the Kursk region. On July 6, the brigade was named after him.

In September 2025, Ukraine's military intelligence claimed it had carried out explosions in Vladivostok, targeting members of the 155th brigade accused of war crimes stationed in the village of Shchitovaya.

== War crimes ==
The unit has been accused of numerous war crimes.

In April 2022, the 155th brigade were accused of war crimes during the occupation of settlements near Kyiv. The brigade occupied the area of the town of Ivankiv — the village of Rozvazhiv in the Vyshhorod district of the Kyiv region.

In March 2023, Reporters Without Borders identified the 155th brigade as one of the Russian units present in the area at the time of the murder of Ukrainian photo-journalist Maks Levin and his friend in a forest north of Kyiv on April 1, 2022.

In August 2024, members from the brigade allegedly beheaded four Ukrainians and displayed their severed heads on poles, behaviour usually associated with Islamic terror groups. The incident happened after an unsuccessful attempt by Ukrainian forces to break through the Russian border at a checkpoint near Kolotilovka, Belgorod Oblast. Russian soldiers published a video in which a member of the 155th brigade threatened AFU fighters operating in Kursk Oblast and showed the head of a Ukrainian soldier impaled on a stake. DeepState, which initially geolocated the video, claimed that the head was severed, but the condition of the head was more likely to indicate that it was torn off by an explosion and was probably lying separate from the body. Later, Ukrainska Pravda wrote that it had obtained intercepted audio recordings in which a Russian serviceman was allegedly ordered to cut off the heads of four dead Ukrainian soldiers.

In October 2024, marines from the 155th brigade counterattacked Ukrainian held territory in Russia's Kursk Oblast. The members overran a team of lightly armed Ukrainian drone operators while advancing toward a string of villages, rather than taking the nine operators captive as dictated by international law, they stripped the Ukrainians, ordered them to lie face down and then shot them in their heads, apparently killing them all. Imagery of the event was widely shared on social media. After the killings, it was reported that some Ukrainian units were deliberately hunting down the 155th brigade, successfully ambushing and killing ″at least a few″ members of the unit.

== Composition ==
=== 2019 ===
- "Tigr" Battalion (2024)
- 59th Naval Infantry Battalion (Slovyanka village)
- 47th Separate Air Assault Battalion
- 287th Self-propelled Artillery Battalion (Slovyanka village)
- 288th Anti-Aircraft Missile Artillery Battalion
