= Novosibirsk Higher Military Command School =

Military high school

- Новосибирское высшее военное командное училище
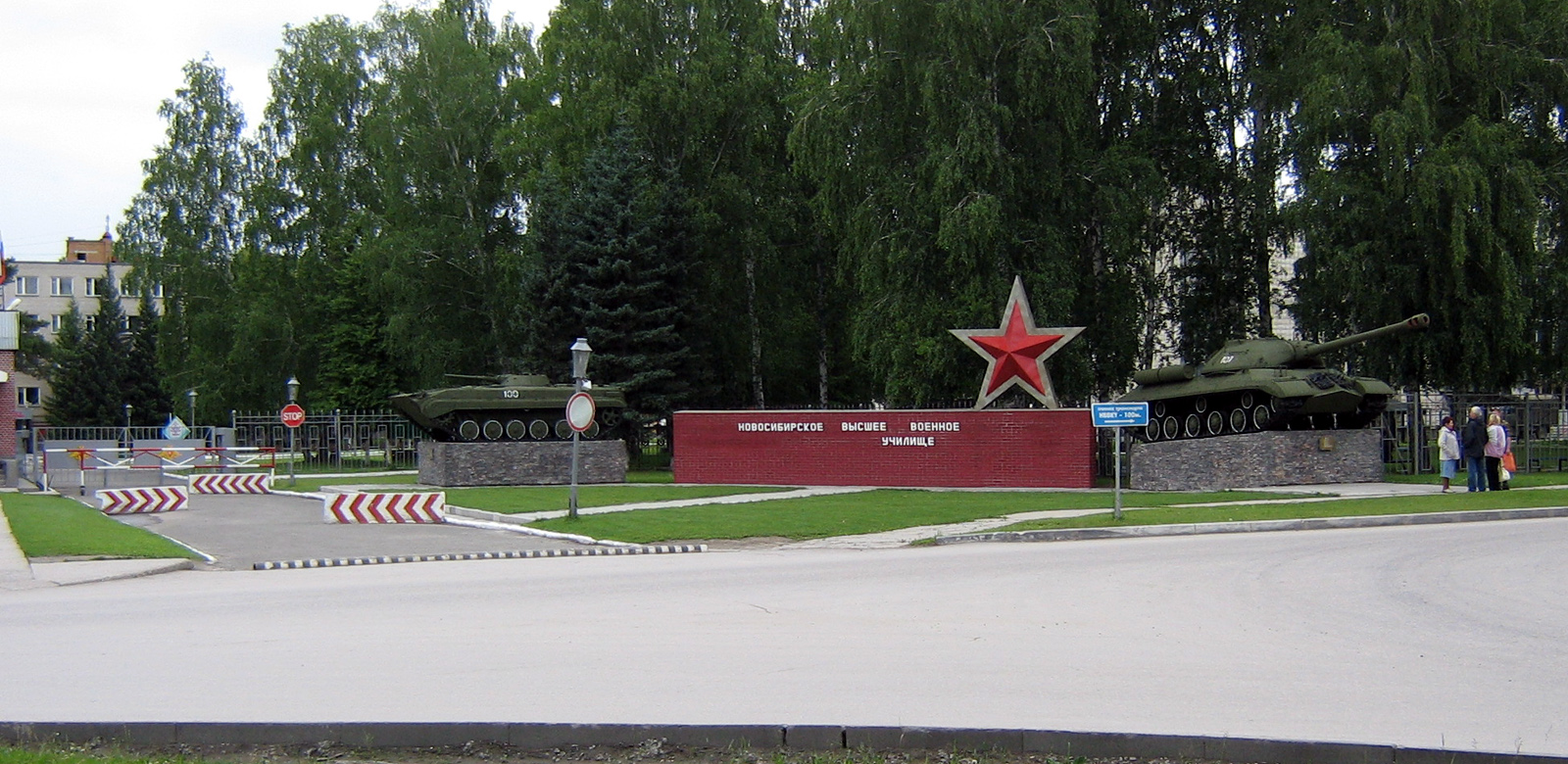
- Type: Higher military school
- Established: 1967
- Rector: Colonel Sergei Markovchin
- Location: 630117, Ivanov Street, 49, Novosibirsk, (Russia)
- Campus: Urban
- Website: https://nvvku.mil.ru/
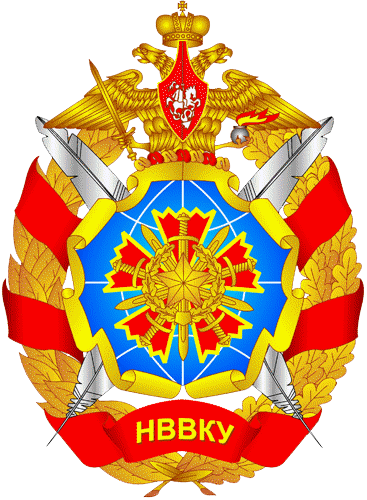

The Novosibirsk Higher Military Command School (Russian: Новосибирское высшее военное командное училище, romanized: Novosibirskoye vyssheye voyennoye komandnoye uchilishche) is a Russian higher military school conducting commissioned officer programmes (specialitet). It is located in Akademgorodok of Novosibirsk.

== History ==
The School was founded in 1967 as Novosibirsk Higher Military-Political Combined Arms School. The School prepared political commissars for the Soviet Army. In 1972, it started to prepare political commissars for the Soviet Airborne Forces.

Due to the dissolution of the Soviet Union, military positions of political commissars were abolished, and, in 1992, the School changed its specialization to the training infantry officers and tactical military intelligence officers for the Ground Forces and was renamed the Novosibirsk Higher Combined Arms Command School.

In 1994, the School started to train tactical military intelligence officers for the Airborne Forces and special military intelligence officers for the Special forces of the Main Intelligence Directorate of the General Staff of the Russian Armed Forces.

In 1998, the School was transformed into Novosibirsk Military Institute. In 2002, the Institute started to train commissioned military psychologists. In 2004, the institute was renamed the Novosibirsk Higher Military Command School (Military Institute).

In 2013, the School ceased the training officers for the Airborne Forces and special military intelligence officers for the Special forces of the Main Intelligence Directorate of the General Staff of the Russian Armed Forces.

In 2015, the School was renamed the Novosibirsk Higher Military Command School.

== Educational programmes ==
The Novosibirsk Higher Military Command School prepares infantry officers, tactical military intelligence officers, and officers-psychologists for the Ground Forces.

== Alumni ==
- Aleksey Galkin
- Sukhrab Akhmedov
