= Akhmad Kadyrov Mosque =

Mosque in Grozny, Chechnya, Russia

- Kadirov Ahmadan ċarax dina mäƶdig Мечеть Ахмата Кадырова
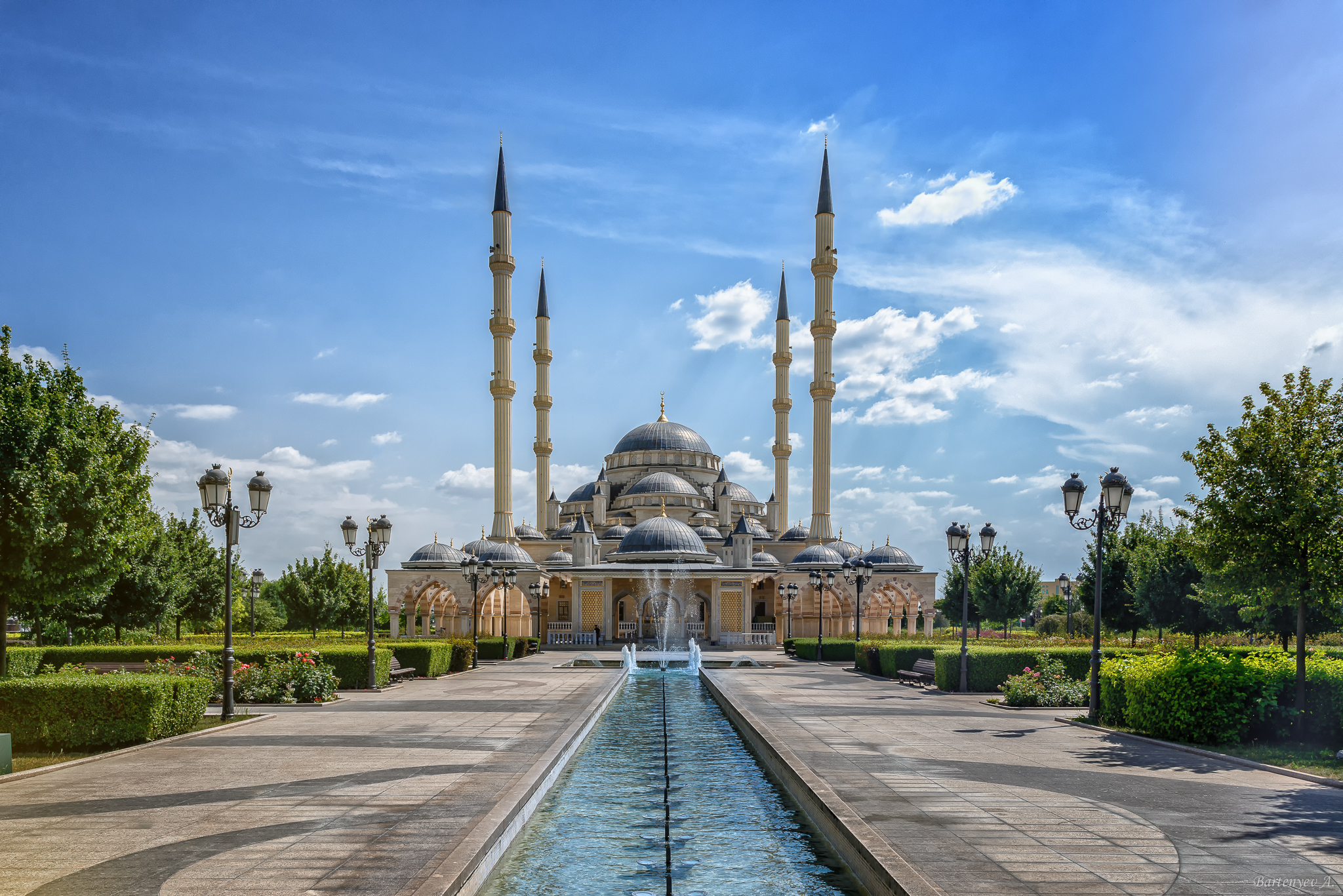

Religion
- Affiliation: Sunni Islam
- Region: Chechnya
- Rite: Shafi'i school

Location
- Location: Grozny
- State: Russia
- Interactive map of Akhmad Kadyrov Mosque
- Administration: Spiritual Administration of the Muslims of the Chechen Republic
- Coordinates: 43.3178°N 45.6933°E

Architecture
- Style: Late Classical Ottoman
- Groundbreaking: April, 2006
- Completed: October 16, 2008

Specifications
- Minaret: 4
- Minaret height: 62 metres (203 ft)

The Akhmad Kadyrov Mosque (Chechen: Кадыров Ахьмадан цӀарах дина маьждиг, romanized: Kadirov Ahmadan ċarax dina mäƶdig; Russian: Мечеть Ахмата Кадырова, romanized: Mechet Akhmata Kadyrova) is located in Grozny, the capital of Chechnya. The mosque is one of the largest in Russia and is officially known as "The Heart of Chechnya" (Chechen: Нохчийчоьнан дог, romanized: Noxçiyçönan dog; Russian: Сердце Чечни, romanized: Serdtse Chechni).

It stands in the place of the former Presidential Palace in Grozny, which was destroyed by Russian forces in the First Chechen War. The mosque is named after Akhmad Kadyrov, the first president of the Republic of Chechnya and father of the current president of the Republic, Ramzan Kadyrov. The construction of the mosque was commissioned by the mayor of the Turkish city of Konya. The mosque's design includes a set of 62-metre (203 ft)-tall minarets which are based upon those of the early seventeenth century Sultan Ahmed Mosque (known also as the Blue Mosque) in Istanbul.

On October 16, 2008, the mosque was officially opened in a ceremony where Chechen leader Ramzan Kadyrov appeared and had a talk with Russian Prime Minister Vladimir Putin.

The mosque is located on the picturesque banks of the Sunzha River in the middle of a huge park (14 hectares) and is part of an Islamic architectural complex, which in addition to the mosque, consists of the Russian Islamic University, the Kunta-Haji, and the Spiritual Administration of Muslims of the Republic of Chechnya.

The mosque's design is executed in the classic Ottoman style, as exemplified in the architecture of Istanbul. The central hall of the mosque is covered with a huge dome (diameter - 16 meters, height - 32 m). The height of the four minarets is 62 meters, making them among the tallest in southern Russia. The exterior and interior walls of the mosque are built of marble and travertine, while the interior is decorated in white marble.

The area of the mosque spans 5000 square metres, allowing a capacity of more than 10000 people. The same number of the faithful can pray in the mosque adjacent to the summer gallery.

== Features ==
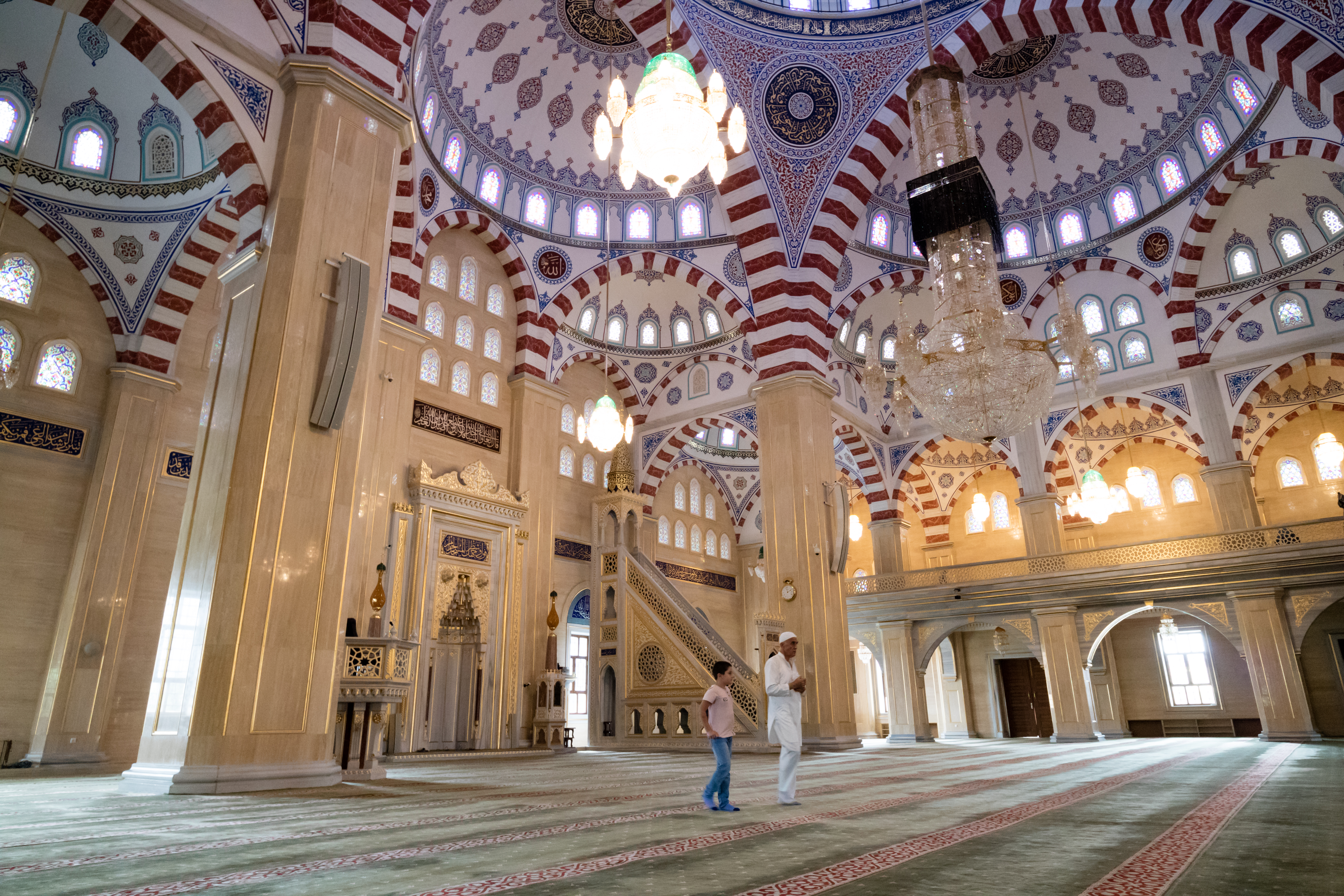
The richly-decorated interior of the Akhmad Kadyrov Mosque. Visible top right: the largest of the chandeliers, featuring a depiction, in black Swarovski crystals (contrasting with the clear), of the Kaaba

Despite its aesthetic reminding of Classical Ottoman architecture, modern techniques were used in the construction of the mosque.

The exterior and interior walls are of marble-travertine, and the temple interior is decorated with white marble, mined in Marmara Adasi island in the Sea of Marmara. The pigments used for the interior paintings were made resistant to fading and peeling with special additives designed to preserve the colours for at least 50 years, and gold was used to render the ornamental calligraphy displaying verses from the Quran.

There are in total 36 chandeliers. Their forms are inspired by, and intended to recall, the three holiest sites of Islam, with 27 of them based upon the form of the Dome of the Rock, 8 modelled upon the Green Dome of Medina, and the largest, measuring no fewer than 8 metres in diameter, designed as a homage to the Kaaba in Mecca itself.

The mihrab in the qiblah wall of the mosque is 8 meters high and 4.6 meters wide and made of white marble. Calligraphy displaying verses from the Quran are woven into the overall pattern of the interior.

The main dome is inscribed with Surah 112 "al-Ikhlâs": "Say: He is God, the Single, Indivisible - God, the Eternal, Absolute. He begets not nor is He begotten - And there happens to be not a single one equal to Him."

== Trivia ==
In 2015, Gabon issued a commemorative coin with the image of CHF 1,000 mosques and Akhmat Kadyrov.

== See also ==
- Islam in Russia
- List of mosques in Russia
- List of mosques in Europe
