= 2026 Moscow restaurant bombing =

Bombing at the Balzi Rossi restaurant

- Part of terrorism and attacks in Russia during the Russo-Ukrainian war (2022–present)
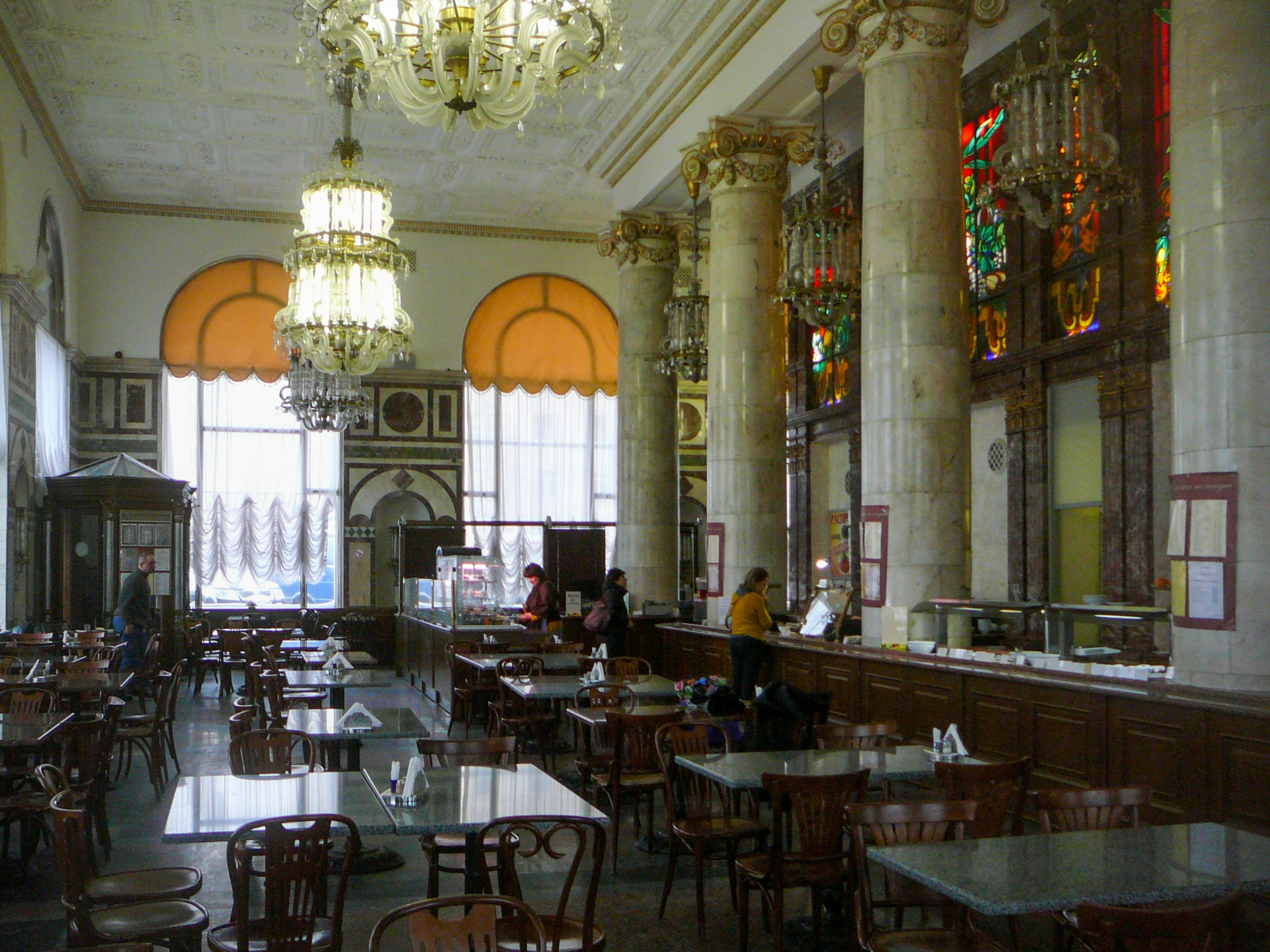
- Cafeteria where the Balzi Rossi restaurant would later be located, 24 March 2013
- Location: 55°45′32″N 37°34′50″E; Kudrinskaya Square Building, Presnensky District, Moscow, Russia
- Date: 1 August 2026; 3 months ago 19:55–20:10 (MSK; UTC+03:00)
- Target: Banqueters at the Balzi Rossi restaurant; Aleksandr Chayko (suspected)
- Attack type: Package bombing
- Weapon: Improvised explosive device with metal ball bearings
- Deaths: 5 (including the bomber)
- Injuries: 19
- Perpetrator: Unknown woman
- Defender: Security guard

On 1 August 2026, a bomb explosion occurred during a private banquet at the Balzi Rossi restaurant on the ground floor of the Kudrinskaya Square Building in central Moscow. The bomber was an unidentified woman who attempted to enter the banquet with a package bomb but was intercepted by a security guard. Before she could get inside, the bomb detonated on the restaurant's veranda just outside of the main entrance. The explosion killed three people, including the woman, and injured 21 others, of which two died later in hospital

The attack was believed to be an assassination attempt on one or more Russian military officials present at the event, especially Commander-in-Chief of the Russian Aerospace Forces and alleged war criminal, Aleksandr Chayko (born July 27, 1971), who was supposedly celebrating his late 55th birthday at the restaurant.

== Background ==
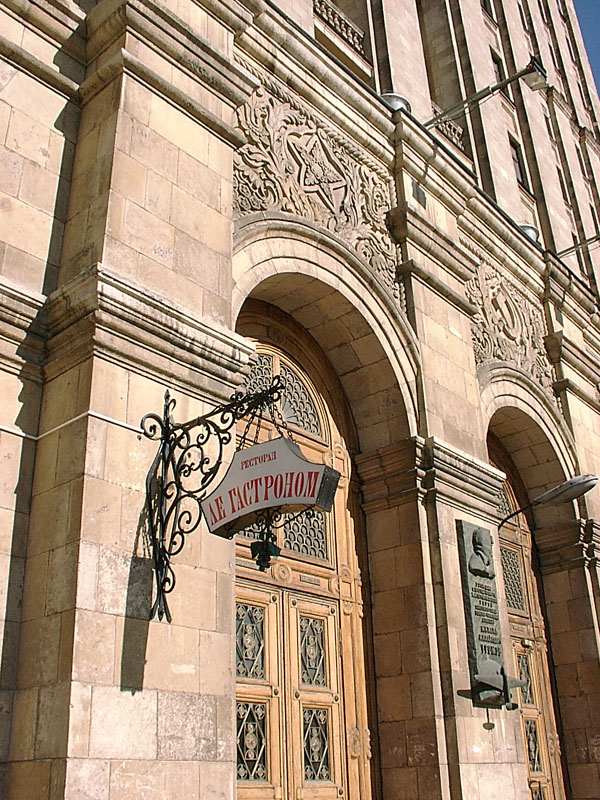
Restoran le Gastronom

=== Balzi Rossi restaurant ===
The Balzi Rossi restaurant occupies the former site of Gastronome № 15, which opened on the ground floor of the Kudrinskaya Square Building on 27 February 1955. It was the largest grocery store in the Soviet Union at the time and was built in a neoclassical style similar to Eliseyevsky. The grocery store was transformed into a cafeteria after the collapse of the Soviet Union. In June 2013, the cafeteria was bought by the A-One Hip-Hop Music Channel and rebranded as the A-One Cafe. The neoclassical building was discofied, a stage and DJ booth were added for concerts in the dining hall, and a menu of street food was incorporated. In June 2015, the Balzi Rossi restaurant was opened by Emanuele Mongillo, transitioning the restaurant to a fine dining establishment. The restaurant focuses on fine dining, haute cuisine, and Mediterranean cuisine. It is high-end and luxurious, being awarded three forks by Gambero Rosso, indicating an extraordinary restaurant. It is decorated with original Stalin-era crystal chandeliers, columns, and stained glass windows, as well as Renaissance statues, plants, and fountains. The restaurant accommodates up to 120 attendees for banquets.

The bombing took place in a series of assassinations of Russian generals participating in the Russo-Ukrainian War. On 17 December 2024, general Igor Kirillov was assassinated by a scooter bomb in Moscow. On 25 April 2025, general Yaroslav Moskalik was assassinated in a car bombing in Balashikha. On 22 December 2025, general Fanil Sarvarov was assassinated in a car bombing in Moscow. And on June 9 2026, general Damir Davydov was assassinated in a car bombing in Balashikha. Russia imputed each assassination onto the Security Service of Ukraine.

=== Banquet ===
On the evening of 1 August, venues at the Balzi Rossi restaurant were closed to the public and placed under strict guard for an £85,000 private banquet being held in the restaurant and its outdoor Summer Terrace. The celebration was attended by about 50 banqueters and 15 security guards with hand-held radios. Russian Telegram channels claimed that the guards stationed at the banquet were off-duty Federal Protective Service personnel, and that it was attended by Russian Federal Security Service officials, government officials, State Duma deputies, and Ministry of Defense generals. Witnesses also described military and government vehicles gathered around the restaurant.

Russian and Ukrainian independent media outlets and journalist Oleg Kashin suspected that the banquet was occasioned for the belated 55th birthday of the Commander-in-Chief of the Russian Aerospace Forces Aleksandr Chayko. Previously, on 16 March, Chayko had been included in the European Union sanctions list against Russian military personnel who "led their units at a time when hundreds of civilians were killed, in some cases as a result of brutal reprisals" for participating in the 2022 Bucha massacre in Ukraine.

Photographs and videos surfaced on Telegram and social media, which showed preparations inside the restaurant's main hall. In the background, a stage can be seen, decorated with the words "Aleksandr 55".

Yan Mateev, an associate of Alexei Navalny, alternatively proposed that the target could have been Major General Vladimir Selivyorstov or lieutenant general Aleksandr Yaroshevich, who were both celebrating their birthdays on the day of the bombing.

Conflicting eyewitness accounts and social media posts contradictingly reported that the banquet was actually for a wedding reception.

== Bombing ==
Around 20:00 MSK (UTC+3), an unidentified woman approached the establishment with a package bomb with a power of approximately 1 kg of TNT equivalent and packed with metal ball bearings intended to act as shrapnel.

The woman attempted to access the banquet with it in hand, but was confronted by a security guard at the entrance. She explained it was a gift, but the guard grew suspicious of the woman and moved to inspect it, at which time, the bomb detonated. The woman, the security guard, and an unidentified banqueter outdoors on the Summer Terrace were killed instantly by the immediate explosion, the woman's severed arm being blown about 15 meters onto a road. Twenty-one others were variously injured by the explosion. Later in the day, two victims died in hospital and six were in grave conditions. While the blast shattered windows, sparked a small fire, and caused a large shockwave that forcefully shook the restaurant, it failed to penetrate the walls of the building; the structure was left almost completely intact with superficial damage caused by ball bearings embedding into the façade.

Banqueters abruptly began to evacuate the restaurant, heading towards Barrikadnaya station while carrying victims. Armed law enforcement officers, Russian National Guard, emergency services, a bomb squad, and an investigative task force were summoned to examine the scene; Russian government vehicles surrounded the premises and cordoned off the restaurant, placing it under investigation. The next day, restrictions were lifted and police and investigators left the scene.

== Investigation ==
Preliminary investigations reported that the security guard's actions foiled the bombing, preventing a far greater number of casualties had the woman successfully infiltrated the banquet.

Investigations also suggested the woman was possibly an unwitting delivery person paid to deliver the package, not aware of the box's explosive contents. Investigators believed the bomb was most likely detonated remotely and not deliberately by the woman.

== Victims ==
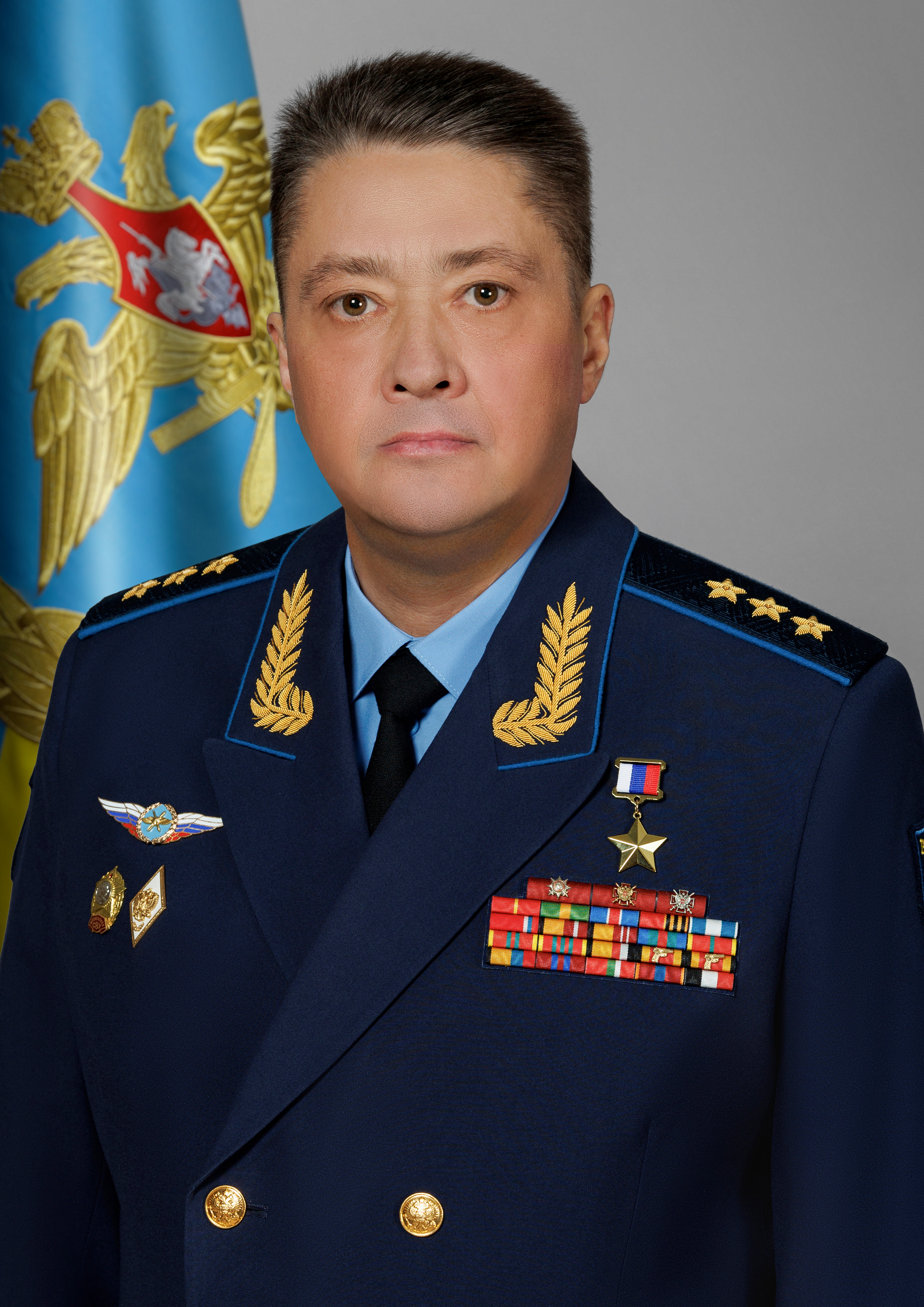
Aleksandr Chayko

It was reported that Chayko managed to escape unharmed with the protection of his bodyguard. While Chayko was uninjured, his daughter Maria was hit by shrapnel and suffered a traumatic brain injury while her husband, Daniil Peredriy, died in hospital and was secretly buried in the Troyekurovskoye Cemetery on 6 August.

Major General Valery Plokhotnyuk died on 1 August, having arrived to the restaurant in a vehicle with flashing emergency lights at the time of the bombing. Other members of Chayko's family composed the remaining deaths.

It was claimed that Lieutenant General Igor Yerusalimov died from injuries, with his funeral being held on 4 August; Plokhotnyuk and Yerusalimov were reported to have been secretly buried in the Troyekurovskoye Cemetery on 5 August. However, when a correspondent at Verstka attempted to contact Yerusalimov, he personally answered and expressed confusion over the reports, demanding, "don't write anything about me". Official records and registries also did not indicate that Yerusalimov had died, and his daughter did not mention his death.

== Reactions ==
Early reports erroneously reported that there was an accidental gas explosion originating from the restaurant's kitchen. This was soon disproven by head chef Carmine Alfieri, who clarified on Instagram that the kitchen remained untouched by the explosion, and that there was a "minor issue" at the restaurant's entrance. The Kudrinskaya Building also does not have a gas supply, rendering a gas explosion impossible.

The Moscow Department of Transportation temporarily suspended transportation on the Garden Ring and Moscow Metro to and from the affected area for the remainder of the day. The city's Night Bike Festival was also postponed indefinitely to another date.

On 2 August, Moscow mayor Sergey Sobyanin released a statement on social media, describing the bombing as a "brutal terrorist act", sending condolences to those affected and assuring that those responsible will be punished.

The Balzi Rossi restaurant closed and stated that they were "deeply saddened by the tragedy and extends its sincere condolences to the families and loved ones of those who were killed” and wished a speedy recovery for those injured.

Margarita Simonyan, editor-in-chief of the Russian state-controlled broadcasting network RT, posthumously awarded the deceased security guard the Tigran Keosayan Prize of 1 million rubles.

The Russian Embassy in Rome released an announcement that blamed the bombing on Ukrainian state terrorists, describing Ukrainian President Volodymyr Zelenskyy and Ukrainian officials as exporters of terrorism, casting threats and aspersions that likened them to al-Qaeda and ISIS. The embassy claimed that the motive of the bombing was to terrorize the Russian Italian community. The announcement also accused Ukraine authorities of being responsible for the recent series of bombings in Russia and the 2026 Monaco bombing.

On 3 August, Deputy Prime Minister of Italy and Minister of Foreign Affairs Antonio Tajani rebuffed the Russian Embassy's statements, calling it a "colossal lie". He reaffirmed Italy's support for Ukraine, remarking “Why would Ukrainians want to intimidate Italians if our country stands alongside Kyiv?”

== See also ==
- List of Russian generals killed during the Russo-Ukrainian war (2022–present)
