= List of Russian generals killed during the Russo-Ukrainian war (2022–present) =

A number of Russian general officers (Note: General officer or flag officer refers to a military officer above the rank of colonel. Flag officers include generals, brigadiers, marshals, commodores, and admirals.) have been killed during the Russo-Ukrainian war (2022–present). Russian sources have confirmed 17 deaths. This has been attributed to Russian senior commanders going to the field to address "difficulties in command and control" and "faltering Russian performance on the front line", insecure communication by Russian forces, and military intelligence, both domestic and from their allies, that has enabled Ukrainians to target Russian generals both in the field and in their cars in Moscow.

These losses exceed those of the Second Chechen War, in which Russia lost ten generals.

== Analysis ==
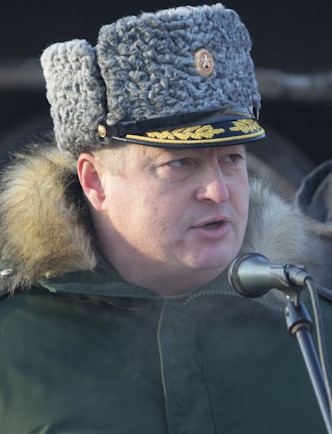
Russian state television reporter Alexander Sladkov reported on the death of General Kutuzov (pictured).

Analysts at the Jerusalem Institute for Security and Strategy and the French Institute of International Relations found that the number of Russian generals killed during the Russian invasion of Ukraine suggests that poor morale among Russian forces and a slow advance into Ukraine forced high-ranking officers to put themselves at risk in an effort to achieve military objectives. UK intelligence attributed the deaths of senior commanders to their going to the field to personally lead operations to address "difficulties in command and control" and "faltering Russian performance on the front line." Western governments say at least ten Russian generals have been killed, which they attribute to major strategic errors. The Japanese government estimates that 20 Russian generals have been killed in the war, based on intelligence gathered by Japan in cooperation with the United States and Europe; retired general Kiyofumi Iwata, former chief of staff of the Japan Ground Self-Defense Force, described the tally as "unbelievably high".

In addition to these flag officers, many other senior officers have been killed by Ukrainian forces; on 23 March 2022, Ukrainian official Mykhailo Podoliak stated that their forces had killed "dozens of colonels and other officers". That day, The Times counted five Russian colonels killed in Ukraine so far. On 11 May, The Independent reported a total of 42 colonels allegedly killed. By the end of April, at least 317 Russian officers had been killed, a third of them majors, lieutenant colonels, and colonels. A Ukrainian official told The Wall Street Journal that a unit of Ukrainian military intelligence was collecting information on the positions of Russian officers, including generals, artillery commanders, and pilots. High-ranking casualties in the Russian Navy include Captain 1st Rank Andrei Paliy, deputy commander of the Black Sea Fleet. Anton Kurpin, the commander of the Russian cruiser Moskva, has also been reported as killed, although Russia has not confirmed this.

The Russian military is top-heavy, with generals playing a larger role in day-to-day operations than in other militaries. Russian battalion commanders were given more authority only three years before the invasion. According to analysts and Western officials, Russia had deployed approximately 20 general officers to Ukraine. Michael McFaul, former U.S. ambassador to Russia, described the number of Russian generals killed as "a shocking number", while General David Petraeus, the former director of the CIA and commander of Coalition troops in Iraq, remarked that it is "very uncommon" for so many generals to be killed and that the Ukrainian military was "picking them off left and right". The Washington Post stated that generals were "killed at a rate not seen since World War II".

The deaths of Russian officers on the front line have been attributed to a number of Russian vulnerabilities in Ukraine, including the use of unsecured communications and the movement of officers to the front line to boost flagging morale and address discipline issues, such as looting. The use of unsecured phones has been attributed to the failure of Russia's secure telephone technology system, Era. In March 2022, two American military officials told The New York Times that Russian generals in Ukraine frequently had conversations on unsecured phones and radios, and that in at least one instance, a general and his staff were killed after the Ukrainians intercepted a call, geolocated it, and attacked the location. The New York Times also reported that U.S. intelligence has provided real-time intelligence to help the Ukrainian military target Russian generals.

The loss of general officers exceeds those of the Second Chechen War, in which Russia lost ten generals.

== List ==
Russia has confirmed the death of 16 generals. Ukraine has claimed the deaths of seven additional generals, two of whom have not been named, (Note: On 23 April 2022, Ukraine's Ministry of Defence claimed a strike on a Russian 49th Combined Arms Army command post in Russian-controlled Kherson Oblast killed two generals and critically injured one.) which Russia has neither confirmed nor denied.

Image	Name	Rank	Position	Date reported	Status	Notes
	Andrei Sukhovetsky	Major General (Note: A major general is a one-star general, equivalent to lowest General rank in NATO ranks most commonly named a variant of Brigadier General, e.g. U.S. brigadier general and UK brigadier.)	Deputy Commander, 41st Combined Arms Army	1 March 2022	Confirmed	Shot by a sniper at Hostomel, Kyiv Oblast, on 28 February 2022. Had previously been involved in the Russian military intervention in the Syrian civil war, and the 2014 Russian annexation of Crimea. His death was reported by a retired Russian intelligence officer on Twitter on 1 March and by Russian online tabloid Pravda.ru on 3 March 2022.
	Vladimir Frolov	Major General	Deputy Commander, 8th Guards Combined Arms Army	16 April 2022	Confirmed	No information about his death was released prior to the notice of his funeral at Serafimovskoe Cemetery, St. Petersburg.
	Andrei Simonov	Major General	Chief of Electronic Warfare Troops, 2nd Guards Combined Arms Army	30 April 2022	Claimed	Killed in an artillery strike on a command post of the 2nd Combined Arms Army, in the vicinity of Russian-controlled Izium, Kharkiv Oblast.
	Kanamat Botashev	Major General (retired)	Wagner Group (possibly)	22 May 2022	Confirmed	Killed in Luhansk Oblast when his Su-25 was shot down by a FIM-92 Stinger missile. He had previously been discharged from the Russian Air Force for crashing a Su-27. Ukrainian sources suggested that he might have been deployed as part of the paramilitary organization Wagner Group.
	Roman Kutuzov	Lieutenant General (posthumous)	Commander, 1st Army Corps, Donetsk People's Republic People's Militia	5 June 2022	Confirmed	Reported by Russian state television reporter Alexander Sladkov on the Telegram messaging app. Kutuzov was reportedly killed near the village of Mykolaivka, Popasna Raion, Luhansk Oblast. Kutuzov's promotion from major general was announced posthumously.
	Sergey Goryachev	Major General	Chief of Staff, 35th Combined Arms Army	12 June 2023	Confirmed	Killed in a missile strike in Zaporizhzhia Oblast during the 2023 Ukrainian counteroffensive.
	Oleg Tsokov	Lieutenant General (Note: A lieutenant general is a two-star general, equivalent to a rank mostly referred to in a variant of Major General in NATO ranks, e.g. U.S. major general.)	Deputy Commander, Southern Military District	11 July 2023	Confirmed	Killed by a missile strike on the headquarters of the 58th Combined Arms Army in Russian-controlled Berdiansk, Zaporizhzhia Oblast.
	Vladimir Zavadsky	Major General	Deputy Commander, 14th Army Corps	28 November 2023	Confirmed	Killed by a Russian mine away from the frontlines, possibly in Kherson Oblast.
	Alexander Tatarenko	Lieutenant General	Commander of Belbek air base	31 January 2024	Claimed	Killed during a SCALP/Storm Shadow strike on Belbek air base in Crimea, in the context of a larger Ukrainian missile and drone attack on 30–31 January 2024 that killed another ten servicemen. The Kyiv Post cites reports in Russian media for the claim.
	Pavel Klimenko	Major General	Commander, 5th Separate Motor Rifle Brigade	6 November 2024	Confirmed	Killed in Ukraine on 6 November 2024, at the age of 47, by a Kamikaze drone. He was awarded the title Hero of the Russian Federation posthumously.
	Igor Kirillov	Lieutenant General	Chief of the Russian NBC Protection Troops	17 December 2024	Confirmed	Killed by an explosive device in Moscow.
	Konstantin Smeshko	Major General	Deputy Commander of Russian Engineer Troops	26 December 2024	Confirmed	Killed in an unknown location allegedly due to a HIMARS strike in one of multiple attacks carried out on this day. His funeral ceremony was held in Moscow in the last days of December 2024.
	Yaroslav Moskalik	Lieutenant General	Deputy Chief, Main Operations Directorate, General Staff	25 April 2025	Confirmed	Killed by a car bomb in Balashikha, Moscow Oblast.
	Ildar Akhmerov	Vice-Admiral	Chief of Staff and First Deputy Commander of the Black Sea Fleet	2 July 2025	Claimed	Circumstances unknown; death reported by Ukrainian and Russian sources.
	Mikhail Gudkov	Major General	Commander, 155 Guards Naval Infantry Brigade and Deputy Commander-in-Chief, Coastal and Ground Forces of the Russian Navy	2 July 2025	Confirmed	Killed in a Ukrainian strike on Korenevo, Kursk Oblast.
	Fanil Sarvarov	Lieutenant General	Head of the Operational Training Directorate of the Russian Armed Forces' General Staff	22 December 2025	Confirmed	Killed by a car bomb on Yasenevaya Street in Moscow.
	Aleksandr Otroshchenko	Lieutenant General	Commander, Mixed Aviation Corps of the Northern Fleet	1 April 2026	Confirmed	Killed in the crash of an An-26 military transport in Crimea.
	Dmitry Mikhailov	Major General	Commander, 144th Motorized Rifle Division	30 July 2026	Claimed	Reported killed in an FPV drone attack near Terny.
	Valery Plokhotnyuk	Major General	Unclear, formerly Chief of Staff, 49th Combined Arms Army	1 August 2026	Confirmed	Killed at the bombing of Colonel-General Aleksandr Chayko's 55th birthday party in Moscow, arriving to the party in a vehicle with flashing emergency lights. Plokhotnyuk was buried in the Troyekurovskoye Cemetery on 5 August.
	Sergey Milchakov	Lieutenant General	Commander, 51st Combined Arms Army	26 August 2026	Claimed	Reported killed in a series of strikes on the primary and reserve command posts of Russian forces in Donetsk.
	Anton Grunis	Major General	Commander, 4th Separate Guards Motor Rifle Brigade	12 September 2026	Confirmed	Reported killed in a drone strike in Donetsk Oblast.

== Rebutted reports ==
The reported deaths of nine Russian generals, and one admiral, have been rebutted or retracted.

Image	Name	Rank	Position	Date reported	Status	Initial report	Correction
	Vitaly Gerasimov	Major General	Chief of Staff, 41st Combined Arms Army	8 March 2022	Rebutted	Claimed killed outside Kharkiv. Had previously been involved in the Second Chechen War, Russian military intervention in the Syrian civil war, and 2014 Russian annexation of Crimea. CNN said it had not independently verified his death and US officials had not confirmed it.	On 23 May 2022, Russian media reported that Gerasimov was awarded the Order of Alexander Nevsky, while dismissing claims of his death. BBC News Russian later reported he was still alive.
	Andrei Kolesnikov	Major General	Commander, 29th Combined Arms Army	11 March 2022	Rebutted	Claimed killed somewhere near Mariupol. However, the Ukrainian claim was not verified by Western media and Russian sources did not confirm his death.	On 14 March 2023, Kolesnikov appeared in an interview with Vladimir Solovyov on Russian TV, reportedly during the latter's trip to Syria.
	Oleg Mityaev	Major General	Commander, 150th Motor Rifle Division	15 March 2022	Retracted	Claimed killed somewhere near Mariupol.	Listed by Ukrainian government war criminals database as alive on 17 February 2023, transferred to another position.
	Andrey Mordvichev	Lieutenant General	Commander, 8th Guards Combined Arms Army	18 March 2022	Rebutted	Claimed killed in a Ukrainian artillery strike on Chornobaivka airfield in Kherson Raion, according to "preliminary information" from Ukraine.	On 28 March 2022, footage appeared reportedly showing Kadyrov meeting with Mordvichev and other commanders in Mariupol. BBC News Russian later reported he was still alive.
	Yakov Rezantsev	Lieutenant General	Commander, 49th Combined Arms Army	25 March 2022	Retracted	Ukrainian officials claimed he was killed as a result of a Ukrainian strike on the command post of the 49th Combined Arms Army at Chornobaivka airfield in Kherson Raion.	Listed by Ukrainian government war criminals database as alive in February 2023, having been transferred to another position.
	Viktor Sokolov	Admiral	Commander, Black Sea Fleet	22 September 2023	Rebutted	Claimed killed in missile strike on the Black Sea Fleet headquarters in Sevastopol, Crimea.	Shown on 26 September 2023 attending a video conference with the Russian military leadership, reportedly the same day. Subsequently, Ukraine said it was "clarifying" the reports of his death and later that they had not confirmed it. The next day, Sokolov appeared in an interview with Zvezda, reportedly commenting on the strike. Rossiyskaya Gazeta reported that he led an award ceremony that morning.
	Valery Solodchuk	Lieutenant General	Commander, 36th Combined Arms Army	20 November 2024	Retracted	Claimed killed by a Storm Shadow strike on an underground military facility in Maryino, Kursk Oblast.	According to the SBU, Solodchuk is alive as of January 2025. He was promoted the following month.
	Alexey Komkov	Major General	Head of FSB's Fifth Service	2 July 2025	Rebutted	Claimed to have been killed by a car bomb in Central Moscow.	Reported to have met with CIA Director John Ratcliffe on 25 August 2026.
	Andrey Averyanov	Major General	Head of GRU's Department of Special Tasks hybrid warfare unit and operations in Africa	19 December 2025	Rebutted	Reported as killed by a drone on board the Russian shadow fleet tanker Qendil.	Visited Madagascar later in December, 2025
	Igor Yerusalimov	Lieutenant General	First Deputy Chief of Staff, Moscow Military District	1 August 2026	Rebutted	Claimed to have been killed at the 2026 Moscow bombing of Colonel-General Aleksandr Chayko's 55th birthday party. A funeral was held on 4 August. He was supposedly buried in the Troyekurovskoye Cemetery with Valery Plokhotnyuk on 5 August.	When a correspondent at Verstka attempted to contact Yerusalimov, he personally answered, expressing confusion over the reports and asked them to not write about him. Official records and registries show that he is not dead and his family has not mentioned his death.

General-Major Artem Nasbulin, listed as Commander, 22nd Army Corps, was reported by Odesa Oblast representative Serhiy Bratchuk as killed, along with 3 officers and over 140 others, following a Ukrainian strike on a Russian command post in Tavriisk, Kherson Oblast, on 12 July 2022. However, The Moscow Times could not find any evidence supporting Nasbulin even existed.

== See also ==
- Casualties of the Russo-Ukrainian War
- List of Ukrainian flag officers losses during the Russo-Ukrainian war
- Order of battle for the Russian invasion of Ukraine
