= Kimizuka =

Kimizuka (written: 君塚) is a Japanese surname. Notable people with the surname include:

- Eiji Kimizuka (君塚 栄治, 1952–2015), Japanese general
- Ryoichi Kimizuka (君塚 良一, born 1958), Japanese screenwriter and director
