= Torgsin =

State-run hard-currency stores that operated in the USSR between 1931 and 1936

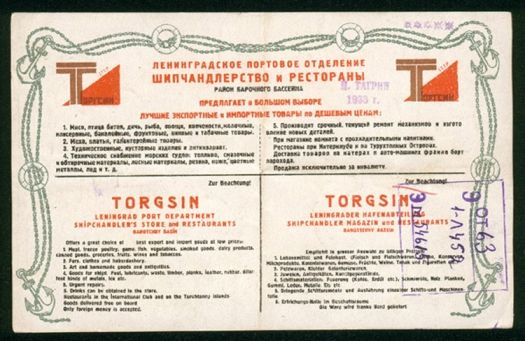
An advertisement for a Torgsin in Leningrad, 1933

Torgsin (Russian: Торгсин) were state-run hard-currency shops that operated in the USSR between 1931 and 1936. Their name was an acronym of the phrase torgovlia s inostrantsami (Russian: торговля с иностранцами), "trade with foreigners". Unlike the later Beryozka stores, Torgsin stores were open to all Soviet citizens, provided they paid with hard currency, gold, or jewels. Initially, Torgsin stores were only accessible by foreigners, hence the name. Torgsin was established by the Sovnarkom chairman Vyacheslav Molotov's order of 5 July 1931 and disbanded on 1 February 1936.

Torgsin stores tended to carry a higher quality of foodstuffs and goods than other stores.

== History ==
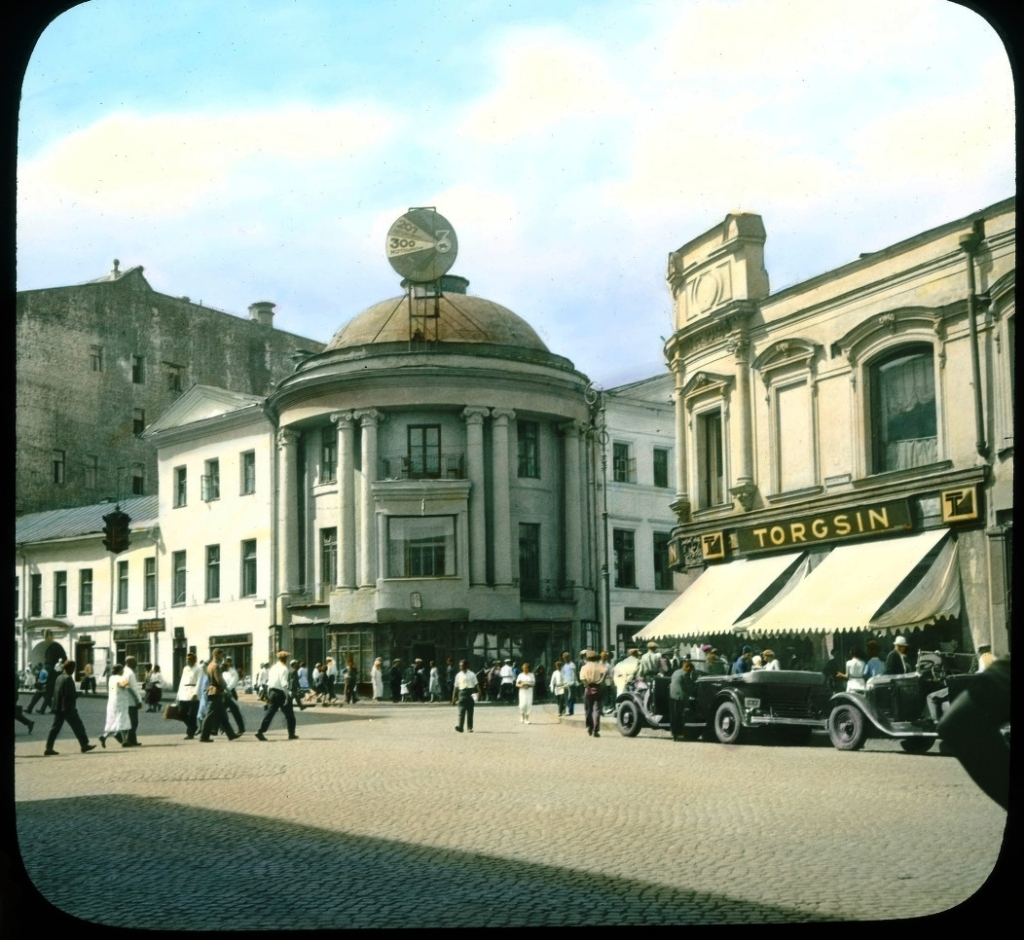
Torgsin building in Moscow, 1931.

At first, Torgsin had only a few stores in large cities that sold antiques to foreign tourists. However, in 1931, Soviet citizens were allowed to buy goods in Torgsin stores for foreign currency, gold, silver, and precious stones. During the famine of 1932-1933, people were forced to exchange their savings for food. In 1933, food products accounted for 80% of all goods sold in Torgsin, with cheap rye flour accounting for almost half of all sales. At the same time, retail prices for food were on average three times higher than for large-scale wholesale sales abroad. The quality of goods and service was low, which was represented by the sale of spoiled products and very long queues. That year, Torgsin received 45 tons of pure gold and almost 2 tons of silver from the population. From 1931 to 1936, Torgsin collected the equivalent of 222 tons of pure gold, 70% of which was obtained from Soviet citizens. Gold was accepted in all forms: ingots, scrap, coins, jewelry, and works of art. Gold items were often broken or disassembled during evaluation, and its actual value was not taken into account. There were also cases of abuse among staff, such as short-weighting and short-measuring of customers, theft, underestimation of the actual weight of precious metals and their fineness. Prices for food products were often greatly inflated. For example, the price of flour was three times higher than world prices. There was also a large price gap for other goods.

== Operations ==
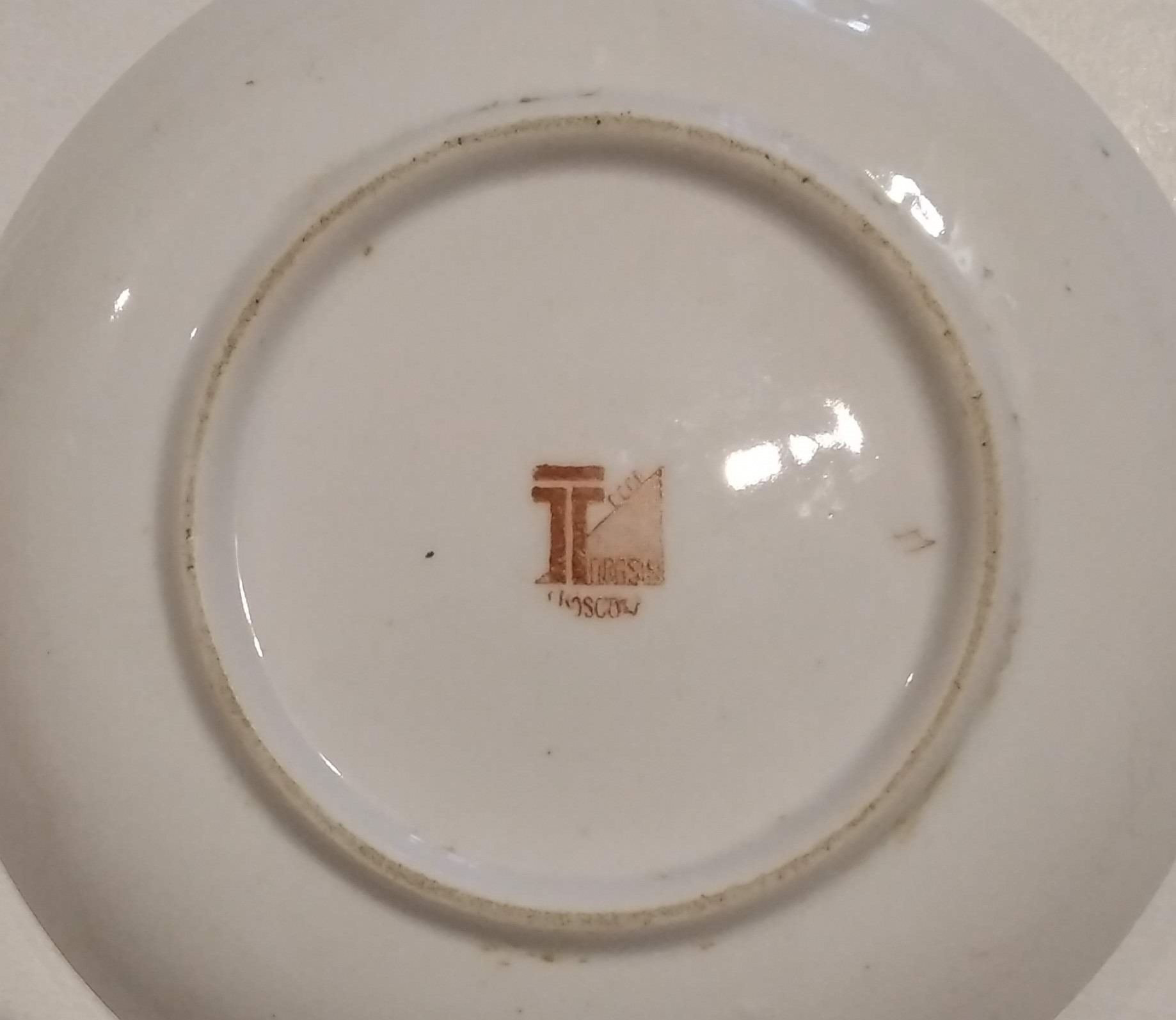
A small plate with the mark "Torgsin" (Dmitrov Porcelain Factory / Verbilki).

Torgsin's trade offices were scattered throughout the country. As of January 1, 1934, their total number was 1,477 outlets. That same year, citizens' interest in Torgsin's goods dropped significantly due to an improvement in the food situation, and the number of offices began to decrease significantly until Torgsin's liquidation in 1936.

The Torgsin collection of shops, among other things, also offered porcelain products (tableware, etc.), produced at several factories, and usually marked with the Torgsin logo (the logo/brand was usually placed on the bottom of the product).

=== Moscow ===
On Arbat Street, No. 50-52, there is a building with the Smolensky grocery store (or Gastronom No. 2; former Torgsin store), now also a grocery store. One of the episodes of the novel "The Master And Margarita" is set here. Before the October Revolution, Ignatiy Aleksandrovich Zverev's restaurant and the shops of the merchant Troilin were located here.

In 1928, according to the design of the architect V.K. Oltarzhevsky, on the site of the demolished buildings, with a significant indentation from the former red line of the street, a house was built for the cooperative "Moscow Association". The building had 5 floors, the corner part was decorated with a balcony located above a three-story semicircular bay window, and ended with a high pylon with a round window and a pyramidal attic. However, already during the early 1930s, the house was rebuilt by the architect V.M. Mayat: he built on the 6th floor, made the tower faceted and raised it to the full height of the former attic. Large chopped inscriptions reading "Torgsin Department Store" were carved along the ends of the pylons and above the entrance vestibule.

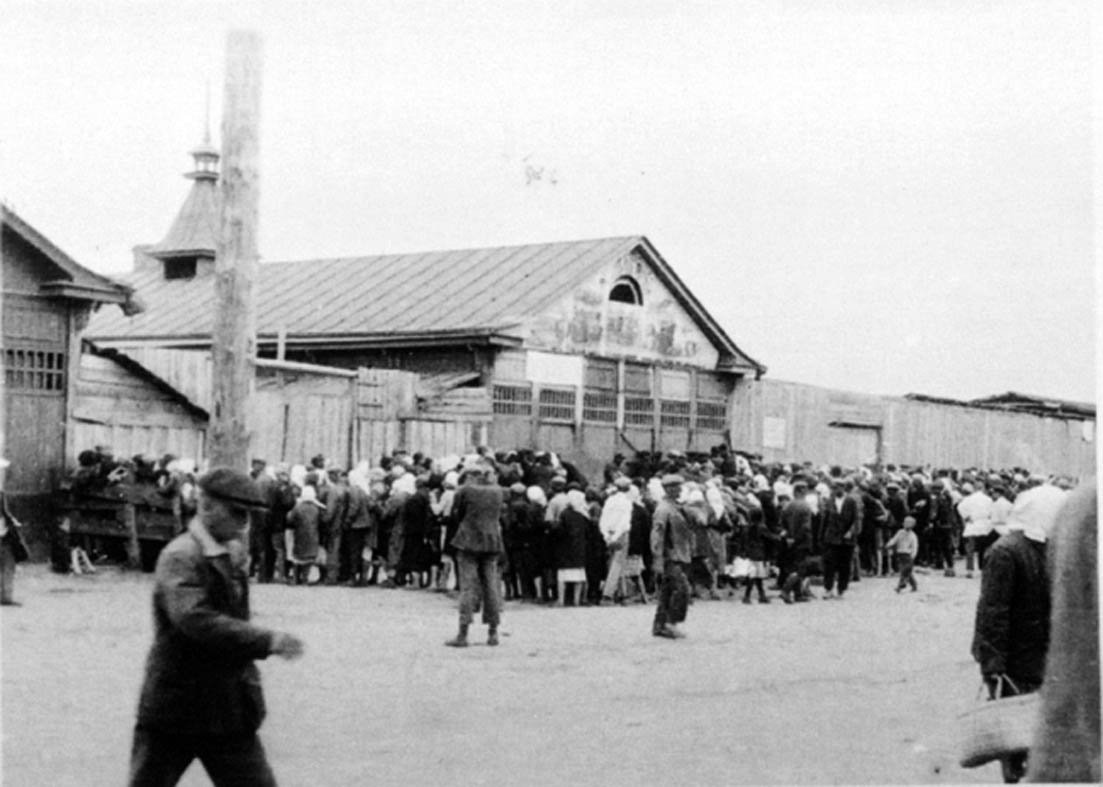
Queue in front of Torgsin in Kharkiv, Ukrainian SSR.

In 1936, Torgsin was abolished and the grocery store was renamed Smolensky (or No. 2 after Eliseyevsky). Until the mid-1970s, the upper floors housed apartments, mostly communal. Then the building was vacated, and after renovations, the upper floors were given to the Ministry of Foreign Affairs (locals nicknamed it "GastroMID"), the main building of which is located nearby on Smolenskaya Square. The second largest Torgsin in Moscow was located at the intersection of Petrovka and Kuznetsky Most streets. There was even a hairdressing salon that was part of the Torgsin system. There were also stores in Moscow: on Sretenka, Gertsena Street, No. 27 (Bolshaya Nikitskaya Street), in the Taganskaya Square area, on Pokrovka Street, on Zemlyanoy Val Square, and at least two stores on Gorky Street (Tverskaya Street). The board of directors was located at the address: Kuznetsky Most Street, No. 14 in the building of the former banking house of the Dzhamgarov Brothers.

=== In other regions ===
The regional trading network of Torgsin was quite extensive. Thus, in the Chernigov Oblast alone, 21 stores operated in September 1933. The West Siberian regional office of Torgsin had its own retail outlets in 22 populated areas[3]. The Vyatka branch had 12 stores in the territory of the former Vyatka province]. Many Torgsin branches operated in the Ivanovo region. The Samara branch consisted of 13 trading units. Stores were also opened in villages.

== See also ==
- Beryozka
- Tuzex
- Insnab
- Intourist
- Eliseyevsky
- Pewex
- Eastern Bloc economies
