= Yoshifumi Hibako =

Japanese general

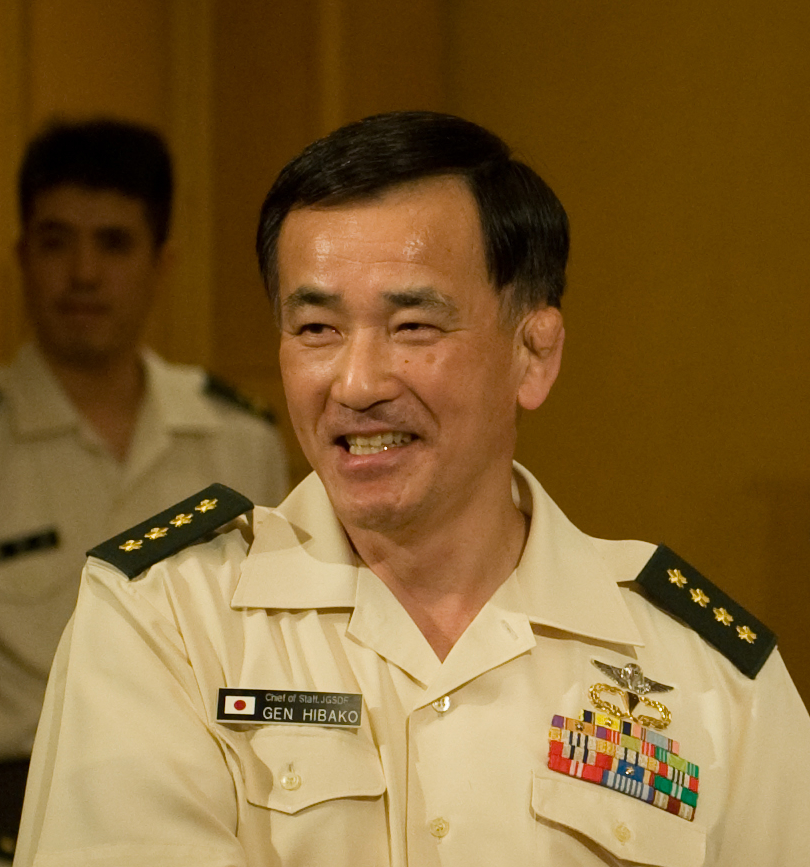
- Born: May 15, 1951 (age 75); Fukuoka Prefecture
- Military career
- Allegiance: Japan
- Branch: Japan Ground Self-Defense Force
- Service years: 36
- Rank: General
- Unit: 1st Airborne Brigade
- Commands: Central Army; Japan Ground Self-Defense Force
- Awards: Legion of Merit
- Other work: Mitsubishi Heavy Industries

Yoshifumi Hibako (火箱 芳文, Hibako Yoshifumi; born May 15, 1951) is a member of the Japan Self-Defense Forces who served as the 31st Chief of Staff of the Japan Ground Self-Defense Force. A graduate of the National Defense Academy of Japan, he later returned to serve as vice-president of the Academy. He has served in multiple capacities, including the chiefs of staff of the GSDF Northern Army during the Iraq War, commanding officer of the Chūbu region Army Headquarters, and has even acted as a Japanese foreign representative when meeting officers of other countries.

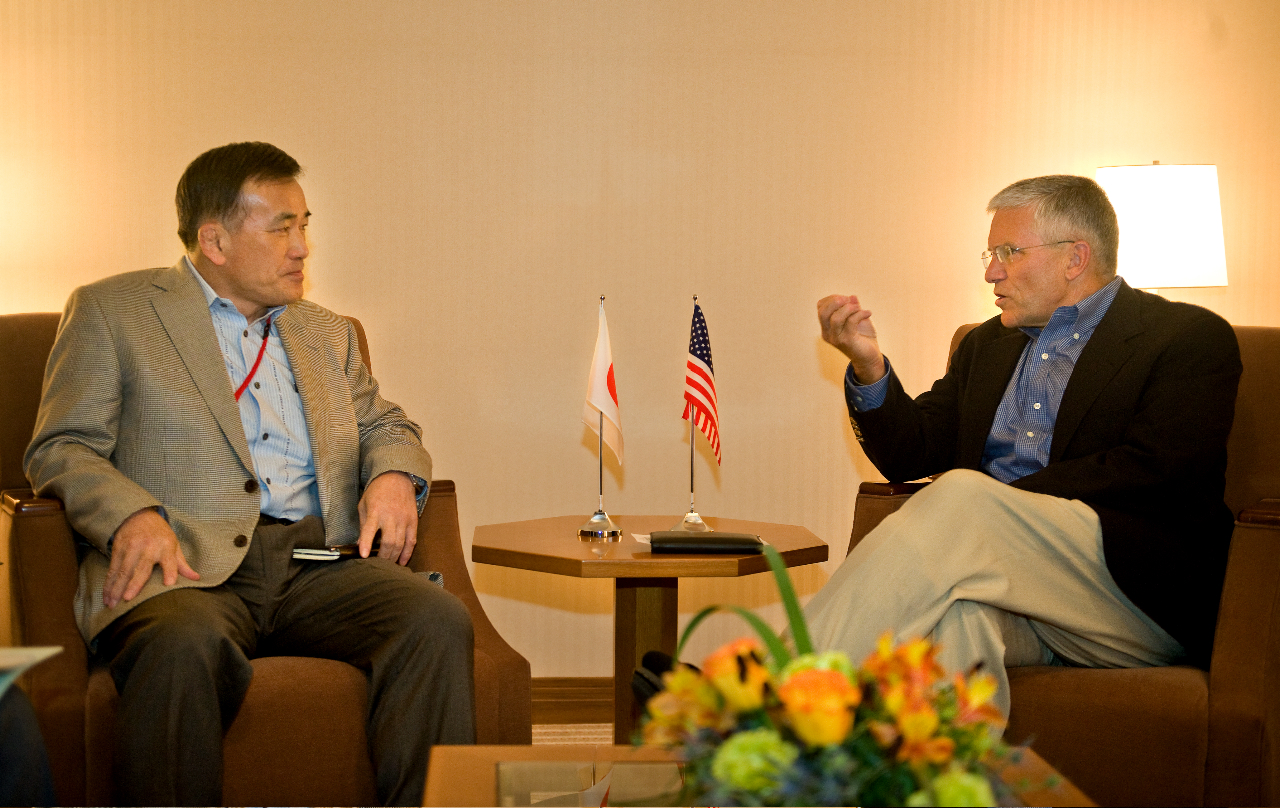
Gen. Yoshifumi Hibako and Gen. George W. Casey Jr. (August 2009)

== Life ==
Hibako entered the National Defense Academy of Japan, graduating in 1974.

== Career ==
After graduating from the Academy, Hibako entered the Japan Ground Self-Defense Force in 1974. He participated in the reconstruction phase of the Iraq War as leader of the GSDF Northern Army. As a mission of the type that the Japan Self-Defense Forces had never dealt with, Hibako had to determine what tactics and equipment to use without much past guidance. In 2007, he served as vice-president of his alma mater, the National Defense Academy.

Hibako was appointed the 32nd Chief of Staff of the Japan Ground Self-Defense Force in March 2009. His role includes advising the Ministry of Defense and overseeing the administration of the GSDF, and ensuring defense, disaster relief, and maintaining ties with foreign military. He has also acted in a semi-diplomatic role, meeting with Chinese Minister of National Defense Liang Guanglie to discuss relations between the two countries in February 2010. He represented Japan at a conference for world militaries to discuss disaster relief and management.

== Medals ==
- Legion of Merit Degree Commander Medal (2011)

Military offices
Preceded by Ryuichi Oriki	Chief of Staff; Japan Ground Self-Defense Force; 2009-2011	Succeeded by Eiji Kimizuka
