= Kanamat Botashev =

Russian major general (1959–2022)

- Канамат Хусеевич Боташев
- Botashev, date unknown
- Born: Kanamat Khuseevich Botashev; 20 May 1959; Lower Teberda, Karachay-Cherkess Autonomous Oblast, Russian SFSR, Soviet Union
- Died: 22 May 2022 (aged 63); Popasna, Luhansk Oblast, Ukraine
- Military career
- Allegiance: Soviet Union; Russia
- Branch: Soviet Air Forces; Russian Air Force; Wagner Group
- Service years: 1981–2013; 2022
- Rank: Major general
- Conflicts: Russo-Ukrainian War; Russian invasion of Ukraine; Eastern Ukraine offensive †

Kanamat Khuseevich Botashev (Russian: Канамат Хусеевич Боташев; 20 May 1959 – 22 May 2022) was a Russian major general who was the commander of the military unit 23326 of the Western Military District and the commander of the Voronezh Malshevo airbase near Voronezh. He was posthumously awarded the title Hero of the Russian Federation.

== Biography ==
In 1976, he graduated from high school. In 1981, he graduated from the Yeysk Higher Military Aviation School of Pilots. In 2010, he graduated from the Military Academy of the General Staff of the Armed Forces of Russia.

On 29 December 2012, a criminal case was opened against him under Article 351 of the Criminal Code (violation of flight rules) for crashing a Sukhoi Su-27 while violating flight rules. He had reportedly piloted the aircraft without undergoing proper training and pre-flight medical checks, and then decided to perform aerobatics and thus accidentally destroyed the Su-27. Botashev was sentenced to four years probation with a fine of 5 million rubles. In 2013 he was discharged from the army. After that he worked as deputy head of DOSAAF in Saint Petersburg and Leningrad Oblast for aviation, and deputy director of an aeroclub in Saint Petersburg.

According to Ukrainian media, he took part in the Russian invasion of Ukraine and died on 22 May 2022 near Popasna, piloting a Sukhoi Su-25 attack aircraft, which was shot down by a FIM-92 Stinger. Russian media later confirmed his death in combat in Ukraine. Observers speculated that Botashev had been flying as a mercenary pilot for the Wagner Group.

== See also ==
- List of Russian generals killed during the Russian invasion of Ukraine
