= Andrei Simonov =

Russian major general

- Андрей Дмитриевич Симонов
- Simonov, date unknown
- Born: Andrei Dmitrievich Simonov; 29 June 1966; Baranovka, Verkhnekamsky District, Kirov Oblast, Russian SFSR, Soviet Union
- Died: 30 April 2022 (Unconfirmed)
- Military career
- Allegiance: Russia
- Branch: Russian Armed Forces
- Service years: 1995–2022?
- Rank: Major general
- Commands: Electronic Warfare Troops, 2nd Army
- Conflicts: Russo-Ukrainian War; Russian invasion of Ukraine

Andrei Dmitrievich Simonov (Russian: Андрей Дмитриевич Симонов; born 29 June 1966, presumed dead 30 April 2022) was a Russian Armed Forces major general (one-star rank) who served as Chief of the Electronic Warfare Troops of the 2nd Army of the Western Military District. On 30 April 2022, the Armed Forces of Ukraine claimed to have killed Simonov in an artillery strike. His death has yet to be confirmed by Russian officials, but has been presumed dead by The Insider, a Russian news outlet.

== Biography ==
Andrei Dmitrievich Simonov was born on 29 June 1966, in Baranovka, Verkhnekamsky District, Kirov Oblast. In 1987, he graduated from the Tomsk Higher Military Command School of Communications and began his service in the Electronic Warfare troops. He served as an operational duty officer, platoon commander, command post leader, and deputy battalion commander.

In 2000, he graduated from the Frunze Military Academy, and was promoted from a senior officer of the Siberian Military District's electronic warfare service to head of the Vostok regional command headquarters' electronic warfare service. In 2010, he graduated from the General Staff Academy and was appointed Chief of the Electronic Security Service of the Western Military District of the Russian Federation. By 2011, he had been promoted to the rank of colonel. Since 2014, he has served as Deputy Chief of the Electronic Warfare Troops of the Russian Armed Forces.

Simonov was promoted to major general in 2016.

=== Alleged death ===
Major General Andrei Simonov was reported as killed in a Grad missile artillery strike carried out by the Armed Forces of Ukraine on 30 April 2022, during the larger Russian invasion of Ukraine. This strike was allegedly carried out against a field command post of the Russian 2nd Army near Izium, during the battle of Donbas. News of the Major General's death was first reported by the Kyiv Post when Ukrainian Presidential military adviser Oleksiy Arestovych claimed in an interview the attack had killed Simonov, approximately 100 Russian troops, and destroyed 30 armoured vehicles. Ukrainian politician Anton Gerashchenko would affirm Simonov's death in a Telegram post. Russia has not yet confirmed Simonov's death.

The Times of Israel and The New York Times have reported that the artillery strike was not intended to target Simonov but rather General Valery Gerasimov, who was present at the command post not long before the attack. Intel of Gerasimov's location was believed to have been provided by the United States and the intention of the attack was confirmed by anonymous United States officials.

== Awards ==
- Medal "For Valor" Ist degree

== Works ==
- Perspective Control System for Electronic Warfare Forces -The Basis for Realizing the Combat Capabilities of Different Forces and Equipment. (Russian: Перспективная Система Управления Соединений Pадиоэлектронной Борьбы - Oснова Pеализации боевых Бозможностей Их Pазнородных Cил и Cредств) ISSN 0236-2058

== See also ==
- List of Russian generals killed during the Russian invasion of Ukraine
