= Andrei Paliy =

Russian commander (1971–2022)

- Андрей Николаевич Палий
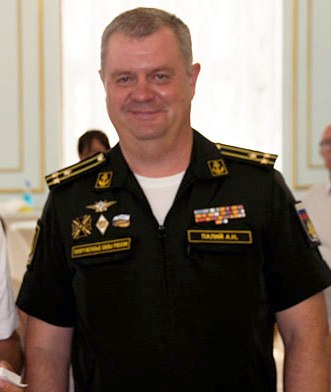
- Paliy in 2020
- Born: 13 February 1971; Kyiv, Ukrainian SSR, USSR
- Died: 20 March 2022 (age 51); Mariupol, Ukraine
- Military career
- Allegiance: Russia
- Branch: Russian Navy
- Service years: 1993–2022
- Rank: Captain 1st rank
- Unit: Black Sea Fleet
- Commands: Deputy commander
- Conflicts: Russo-Georgian War; Syrian Civil War; Russo-Ukrainian War; Russian invasion of Ukraine; Siege of Mariupol †

Andrei Nikolayevich Paliy (Russian: Андре́й Никола́евич Па́лий; 13 February 1971 – 20 March 2022) was a Russian naval officer who served as the deputy commander of the Black Sea Fleet. He was killed in combat in the Battle of Mariupol during the Russian invasion of Ukraine.

== Biography ==
Paliy was born in Kyiv on 13 February 1971. In 1993, he chose not to be part of the Ukrainian armed forces and joined the Russian Northern Fleet.

He served on the battlecruiser Pyotr Velikiy.

Paliy was also involved in the Russo-Georgian War and the Russian intervention in Syria, according to media sources in Russia.

After the Russian annexation of Crimea, Paliy worked for the Russian naval academy in Sevastopol.

He reached the rank of captain 1st rank and served as the deputy commander of the Black Sea Fleet. According to Kommersant, he became deputy commander in 2019.

He was killed in combat on 20 March 2022 in the Battle of Mariupol during the Russian invasion of Ukraine. A funeral was held in Sevastopol on 23 March.

== See also ==
- Casualties of the Russo-Ukrainian War
- List of Russian generals killed during the 2022 invasion of Ukraine
