= Eiji Kimizuka =

Japanese military officer (1952-2015)

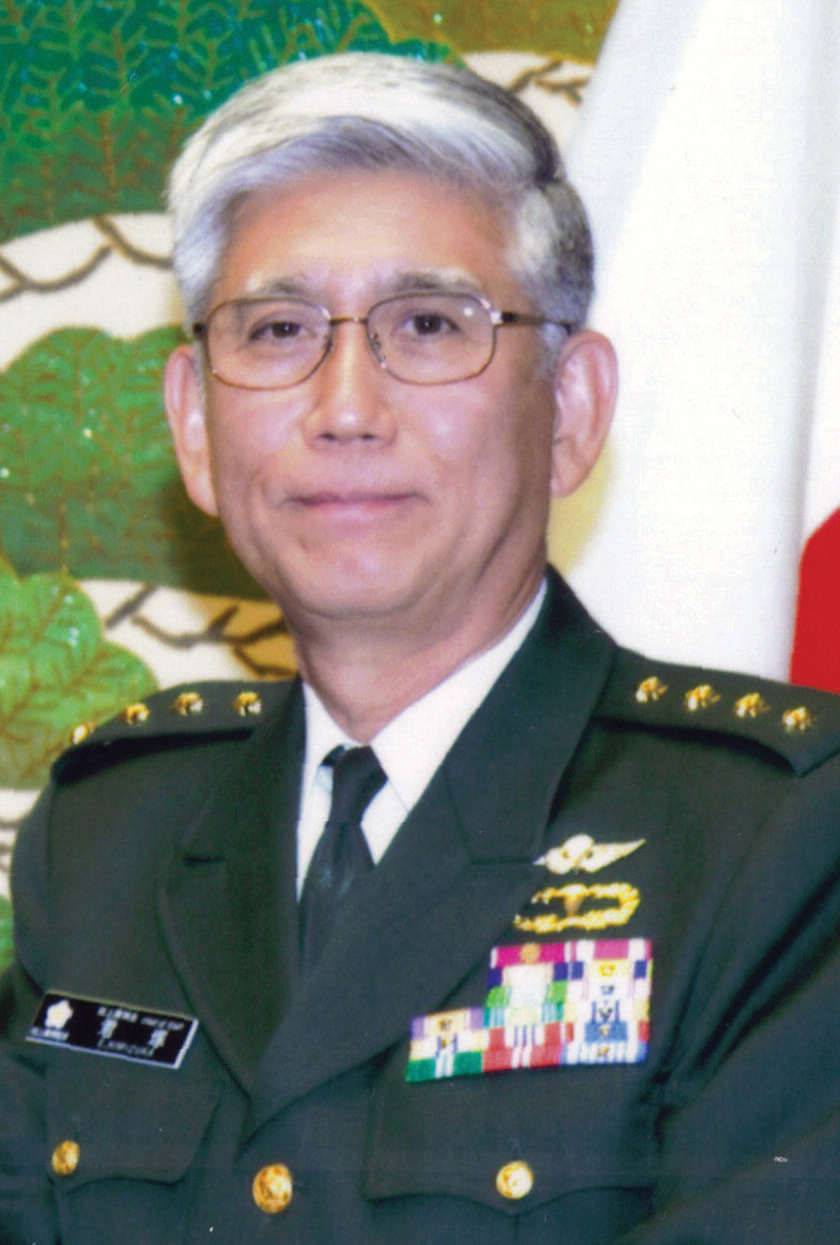
- Born: July 16, 1952; Kanagawa Prefecture
- Died: December 28, 2015 (aged 63)
- Military career
- Allegiance: Japan
- Branch: Japan Ground Self-Defense Force
- Service years: 1976–2013
- Rank: General
- Commands: North Eastern Army
- Awards: Order of the Sacred Treasure, Second Class (2015); Legion of Merit, Officer’s Degree (2008); Meritorious Service Medal
- Other work: Komatsu Limited

Eiji Kimizuka (君塚栄治, Kimizuka Eiji; July 16, 1952 – December 28, 2015) was the 32nd Chief of Staff of the Japan Ground Self-Defense Force, the de facto army of Japan. He was promoted to four-star General and assumed the position on August 5, 2011.

== Career ==
Kimizuka was born and raised in Kanagawa Prefecture. He attended the National Defense Academy of Japan, graduating in 1976 into the Ground Self-Defense Force. Kimizuka was initially trained in field artillery, and served in a number of artillery command roles at the company-grade and field-grade levels. Throughout his career, he has attended a number of military schools including Japanese Ranger School, Japanese Airborne School, and the United States Army Command and General Staff College.

Promoted to colonel in 1995, Kimizuka served as the commander of the 10th Artillery Regiment at JGSDF Camp Toyokawa. In 1999, he became chief of Defense Planning Division, Ground Staff Office.

Promoted to major general in 2001, Kimizuka served as the vice chief of staff, Western Army in Kumamoto Prefecture. In 2003, he became commander of the 1st Combined Brigade at JGSDF Camp Naha. In 2006, he became chief of staff of the Central Army at JGSDF Camp Itami.

Promoted to lieutenant general in 2007, Kimizuka served as the commander of the 8th Division. Later, in 2009, he became the commander of the North Eastern Army, headquartered in Sendai. After the 2011 Tōhoku earthquake and tsunami, Kimizuka led Joint Task Force - Tohoku, a massive 100,000-soldier relief effort coordinated with American forces in Operation Tomodachi. He died on December 28, 2015, of lung cancer.

== Awards ==
- - Order of the Sacred Treasure, Gold and Silver Star (2nd class) (2015)
- - Legion of Merit, Officer’s Degree (2008)
- - Meritorious Service Medal

=== Defensive memorial cordon ===
- 2nd Defensive Memorial Cordon with 1 gold Cherry Blossom
- 10th Defensive Memorial Cordon
- 11th Defensive Memorial Cordon with 1 Silver Cherry Blossom
- 15th Defensive Memorial Cordon with 1 silver cherry blossom
- 19th Defensive Memorial Cordon
- 20 Defensive Memorial Cordon with 1 silver Cherry Blossom
- 21st Defensive Memorial Cordon
- 26th Defensive Memorial Cordon with 1 gold Cherry Blossom
- 32nd Defensive Memorial Cordon
- 33rd Defensive Memorial Cordon
- 41st Defensive Memorial Cordon with 1 gold Cherry Blossom

Military offices
Preceded by Yoshifumi Hibako	Chief of Staff; Japan Ground Self-Defense Force; 2011-2013	Succeeded by Kiyofumi Iwata
