= Insnab =

Insnab (a combination from the Russian "INostranets" (foreigner) and "SNABzheniie" (provision)) was a Soviet state organization responsible for the provision of foreign specialists and workers employed in the Soviet industry with food and commodities. It was established in 1932 with the aim to reduce the impact of food shortages on foreign communities. Within the system of food rationing introduced in the early 1930s, foreign specialists and workers were one of the most privileged group in the USSR. For example, in 1932, American and Canadian specialists employed in the Soviet Karelia were provided with basic foodstuffs according to the following monthly norms:

- Meat - 7 kg per person, 3 kg per family member
- Butter - 1.5 kg per person, 1 kg per family member
- Fish - 3 kg per person, 2 kg per family member
- Sugar - 3 kg per person, 1.5 kg per family member.

Russian workers who received basics products according to the 2nd rate applied in Soviet Karelia were supplied according to the following monthly norms:

- Meat - 1 kg per person, 1 kg per family member
- Butter - not supplied
- Fish - 2 kg per person, 1 kg per family member
- Sugar - 1 kg per person, 1 kg per family member.

== See also ==
- Torgsin
