= Konstantin Smeshko =

Russian military commander (1962–2024)

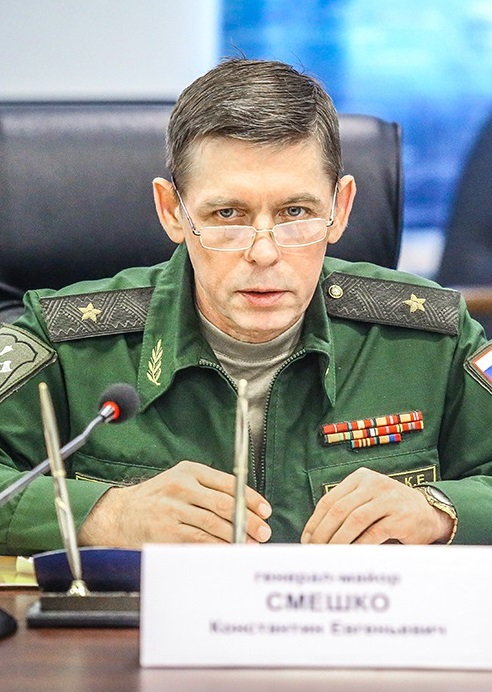
Smeshko in 2017

Konstantin Evgenievich Smeshko (Russian: Константин Евгеньевич Смешко; 28 December 1962 – 26 December 2024) was a Russian military commander who was deputy chief of the Engineer Troops (starting in 2017) and a major general.

He previously commanded the engineering troops of the Far Eastern Military District and those of the Southern Military District from 2012 to 2017.

In 2015, he was responsible for cleaning the area of explosive objects on the territory of the Chechnya and the Ingushetia. For that, he was awarded the honour "Mastery in clearing of (to the Party of) mines in the Chechen Republic and the Republic of Ingushetia". He later also operated the demining near Deir ez-Zor, Syria in 2017.

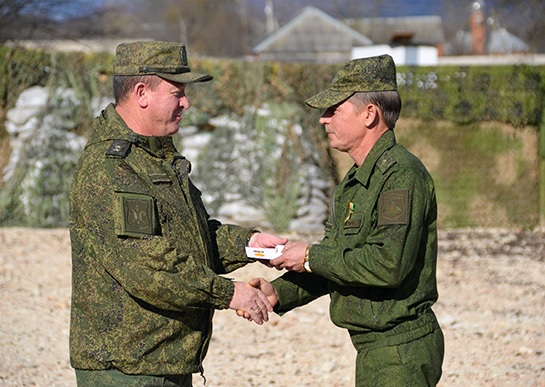
With Yuri Stavitsky

Killed in an unknown location allegedly by a HIMARS strike in one of the multiple attacks carried out in December. His funeral ceremony was held in Moscow in last days of December 2024.

== See also ==
- List of Russian generals killed during the Russian invasion of Ukraine
