= Hajime Sakaki =

First Japanese psychiatry professor (1856–1897)

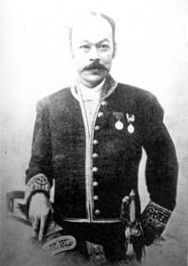
- Born: August 28, 1856
- Died: February 6, 1897 (aged 40)
- Known for: First psychiatry professor in Japan
- Medical career
- Field: Psychiatry
- Institutions: University of Tokyo

Hajime Sakaki (August 28, 1856 – February 6, 1897) was a Japanese physician and the first professor of psychiatry in that country. Though he was a proponent of biological psychiatry, Sakaki ran a Tokyo insane asylum and he made early attempts to introduce work therapy for confined psychiatric patients. Using field work and his study of patients in the asylum, Sakaki created a classification and diagnosis system for psychiatric disorders.

Sakaki mentored Shuzo Kure, who became Sakaki's successor and ultimately advanced the institutionalization of the mentally ill.

== Education ==
In the years just before Sakaki entered medicine, it had been common for Japanese medical schools to be staffed entirely by German professors. Japanese students began to travel to Germany for their medical training, and over time many of them returned to Japan to teach at the medical schools. When Sakaki completed his medical degree at Imperial University at Tokyo, the government of Japan funded Sakaki's psychiatry training in Germany from 1882 to 1886.

In Germany, Sakaki was influenced by the lectures of physicians including Erwin Bälz, Karl Friedrich Otto Westphal and Emanuel Mendel. His study of psychiatry was complemented by work on the histology of the central nervous system. Biological psychiatry was prominent in Europe, and Sakaki came to view mental illness as having organic underpinnings.

== Career ==
Upon leaving Germany at the end of his training, Sakaki became the director of the Tokyo Public Asylum and the director of psychiatry for the medical school at the University of Tokyo. Though the asylum had been open since 1873, Sakaki was the institution's first physician, so he inherited a facility whose objective had long been to confine the mentally ill rather than to provide any treatment. Besides running the asylum, Sakaki created a system used for the diagnosis and classification of psychiatric illnesses. He used that system to facilitate research work into mental illness. In order to further the work he had done on classification of mental disorders, Sakaki led his psychiatry department and medical students in psychiatric field work in rural Japan.

Based on experiences that he had while observing German asylums, Sakaki introduced work responsibilities to the patients in Japanese asylums. However, this work therapy was only assigned to certain patients, and the work opportunities were limited in comparison to later applications of it.

== Personal life ==
Sakaki's younger brother, Yasuzaburō Sakaki, was also a psychiatrist and was a professor at Kyushu University. The younger Sakaki was friends with Albert Einstein and he had a love for music, having founded the philharmonic orchestra at Kyushu University.

== Death and legacy ==
Sakaki died unexpectedly in 1897, and one of his field work participants, Shuzo Kure, was selected as Sakaki's successor the next year. Kure also trained in Germany and he used the psychiatric classifications advanced by Emil Kraepelin. Kure also subscribed to Sakaki's beliefs in biological psychiatry even though Kraepelin held that biological psychiatry could not be proven valid. Kure later wrote the first published work in Japan on suicide.

Insane asylums proliferated under Kure's influence, as Tokyo had eight of them by 1900. There were also liberal rules supporting the detention of the mentally ill by police officers. Kure was able to advance Sakaki's ideas for work therapy for institutionalized patients.
