= Yaroslav Moskalik =

Russian military officer (1966–2025)

Lieutenant general Yaroslav Moskalik
- Ярослав Ярославович Москалик
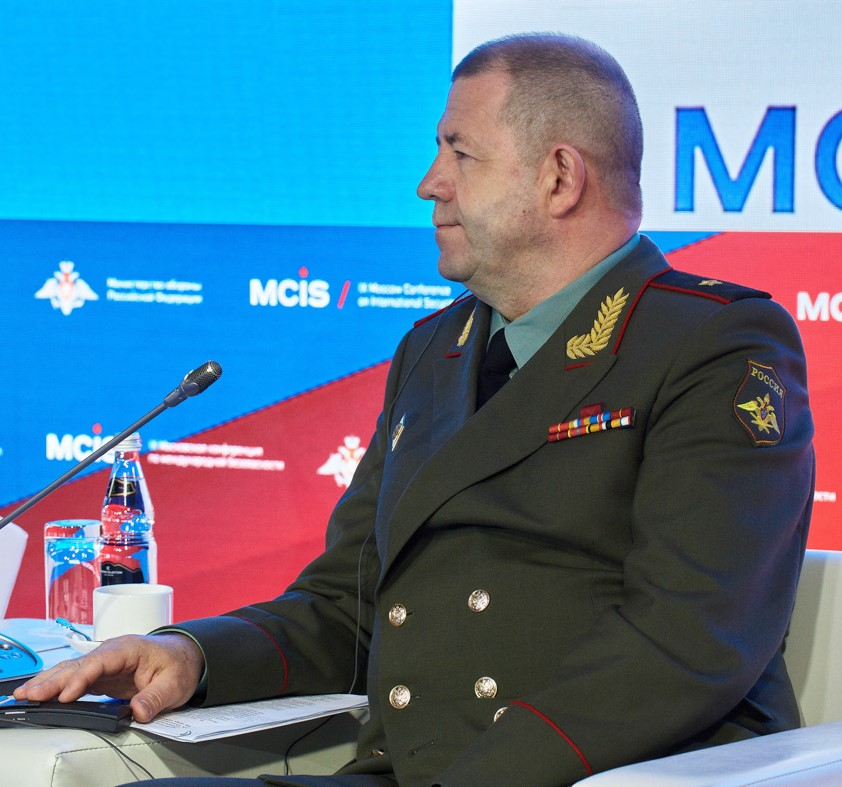
- Moskalik in 2021
- Born: 22 August 1966; Angren, Uzbek SSR, Soviet Union
- Died: 25 April 2025 (aged 58); Balashikha, Russia
- Cause of death: Assassination by car bomb
- Military career
- Allegiance: Russia
- Branch: Russian Armed Forces
- Service years: 1983–2025
- Rank: Lieutenant general
- Unit: General Staff
- Commands: Deputy Chief − Main Operations Directorate of the General Staff

Yaroslav Yaroslavovich Moskalik (Russian: Ярослав Ярославович Москалик, 22 August 1966 – 25 April 2025) was a Russian lieutenant general who served as Deputy Chief of the Main Operations Directorate of the General Staff of the Russian Armed Forces. He was killed in a car bomb explosion in Balashikha, Moscow Oblast, in April 2025.

== Early life ==
Moskalik was born on 22 August 1966 in Angren, in the Tashkent Region of what was then the Uzbek SSR.

== Military career ==
Moskalik began his service in the Russian Armed Forces in 1983 and graduated from the Far Eastern Higher Combined Arms Command School in 1987 and the Combined Arms Academy of the Armed Forces of the Russian Federation in 2002.

Moskalik held the rank of Major General and served as the Deputy Chief of the Main Operations Directorate of the General Staff of the Russian Armed Forces.

He was a senior officer involved in strategic military operations and represented the Russian General Staff in negotiations with Ukraine in Paris in 2015 and, at least in 2019, in Normandy Format, a group made up of teams from Germany, Russia, Ukraine and France who oversaw the Minsk agreements designed to end the war between Ukraine and Russia-backed separatist forces that broke out in 2014.

In December 2021, Moskalik was promoted to the rank of Lieutenant general.

== Assassination ==
A CCTV camera recorded a car explosion that killed General Yaroslav Moskalik.

Around 10:40 local time on 25 April 2025, Moskalik was killed in a car bomb explosion in Balashikha, a suburb east of Moscow. According to reports, an improvised explosive device (IED) with shrapnel was detonated remotely in a parked car as Moskalik, who lived in the area, passed by. The explosion was powerful enough to shatter windows in nearby buildings. Russia's Investigative Committee classified the incident as murder and confirmed the use of a homemade explosive device.

A similar incident occurred in December 2024, when another Russian general, Igor Kirillov, was killed in a bomb attack in Moscow, attributed by both the Security Service of Ukraine and Russian authorities to Ukrainian intelligence services.

On 26 April, the Russian Federal Security Service (FSB) announced the arrest and confession of Ignat Kuzin, a 42-year old Russian national who formerly lived in Ukraine, for planting the explosives on behalf of Ukrainian intelligence in exchange for $18,000. He was subsequently charged with terrorism. On November 27, the court sentenced him to life imprisonment.

== See also ==
- List of Russian generals killed during the Russian invasion of Ukraine
