= Igor Yerusalimov =

Russian lieutenant general (born 1972/1973)

- Игорь Феликсович Ерусалимов
- Born: 1972 or 1973 (age 53–54)
- Military career
- Allegiance: Russia
- Rank: Lieutenant General

Igor Feliksovich Yerusalimov (Russian: Игорь Феликсович Ерусалимов; born 26 August 1972) is a Russian army officer and the Head of the Western Military District Headquarters serving from 2020 to 2024, and was made a Lieutenant General in May 2025 by presidential decree.

On Telegram, Yerusalimov was rumoured to have been killed in a bomb blast inside the Balzi Rossi restaurant in Moscow on 1 August 2026, during the 2026 Moscow bombing while attending general Aleksandr Chayko's 55th birthday party. A funeral was held on 4 August and he was reported to have been secretly buried in the Troyekurovskoye Cemetery with Valery Plokhotnyuk on 5 August. However, when a correspondent at Verstka attempted to contact the supposedly buried Yerusalimov, he answered and was confused by the reports, saying "don't write anything about me". Official records and registries indicated that he is not dead.
