= Kiyofumi Iwata =

- 岩田清文
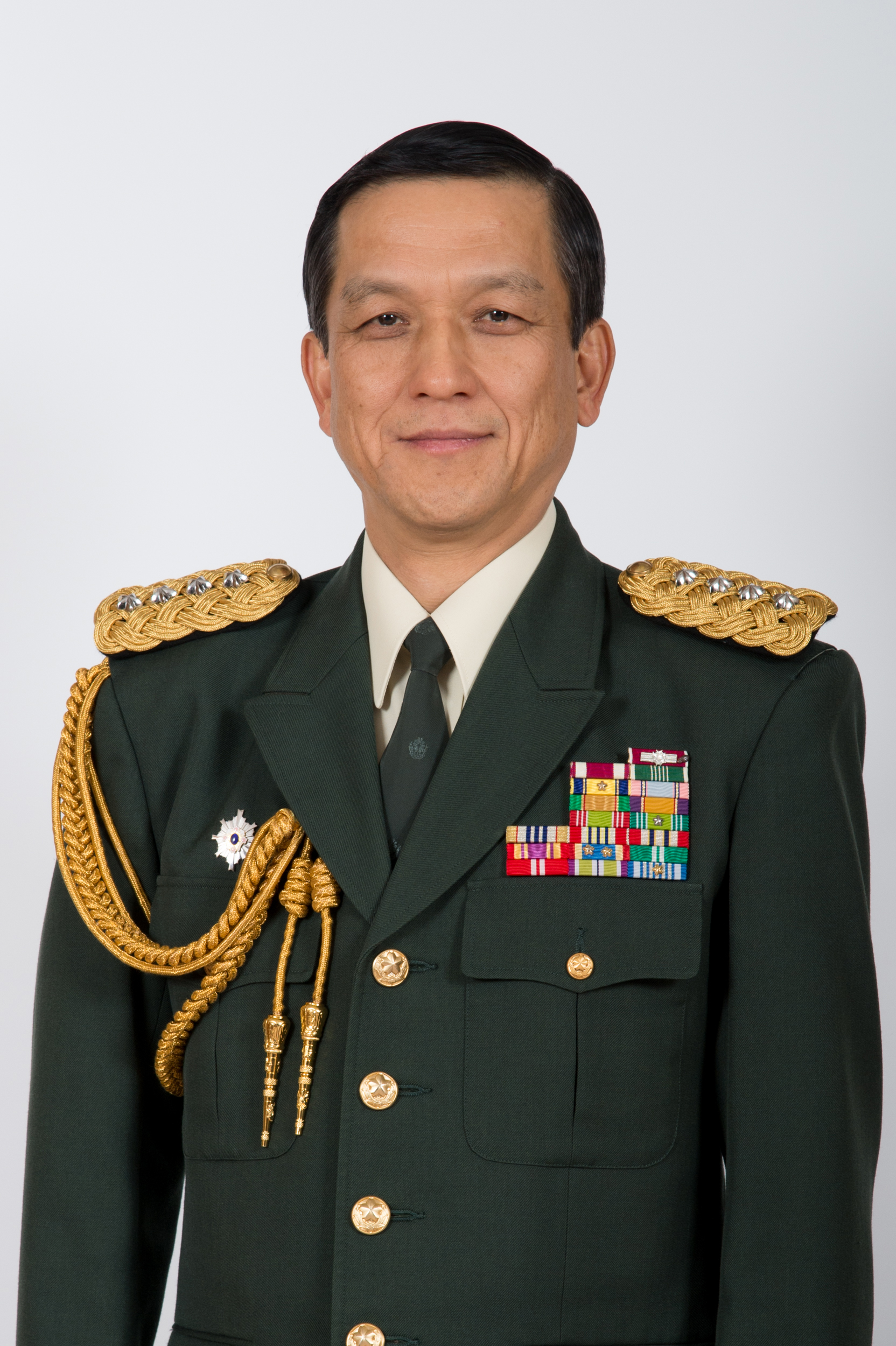
- Iwata in 2015
- Born: February 3, 1957 (age 69); Tokushima Prefecture, Japan
- Military career
- Branch: Army
- Service years: 1979-2016
- Rank: Lieutenant General, Chief of Staff of the Ground Self-Defense Force
- Units: 23rd batch, Electrical Engineering,
- Commands: 4th Tank Battalion, Kusu Garrison, 71st Tank Regiment, Northern Army,
- Awards: Legion of Merit

Kiyofumi Iwata (born February 3, 1957) is a Japanese Ground Self-Defense Force officer. He served as the 34th Chief of Staff of the Ground Self-Defense Force and the 33rd Commander of the Northern Army.

== Biography ==
He was born in Tokushima Prefecture. He served in the Armored Corps up to the rank of Lieutenant Colonel. He is the first Chief of Staff of the GSDF to be appointed from the Northern Army in 10 years, since Lieutenant General Hajime Sakizaki, the first Chief of Staff of the Joint Staff. During his time as Commander of the Northern Army, he made requests for "mission readiness, thorough training, and regional cooperation." He served as Chief of Staff of the GSDF for about three years and was considered a candidate to become the next Chief of Staff of the Joint Staff, but in the latter half of his term, numerous serious incidents occurred. The final blow was a rifle misfire incident by a soldier at the Northern Army's Shikaribetsu Training Area, which forced him to retire to take responsibility for managing and supervising the incident.

According to Senkaku Publishing, the plan to change the JGSDF uniforms from their current moss green to purple, the Joint Staff Office's image color, at the end of 2018 is said to be a "parting gift" from Iwata, who was forced to retire despite aiming to become Chief of Staff of the Joint Staff. Additionally, according, following the first change in the JGSDF Special Honor Guard uniforms in 52 years, a second model change of the "regular uniform" is planned, affecting 139,000 JGSDF personnel. The new uniforms will be purple, the color of the Joint Staff Office, and the person who strongly advocated for the change to the new uniforms is said to be "the former Chief of Staff of the JGSDF who retired last June."
