= Eliseyevsky =

Grocery shop in Moscow, Russia

Coordinates: 55°45′51″N 37°36′25″E

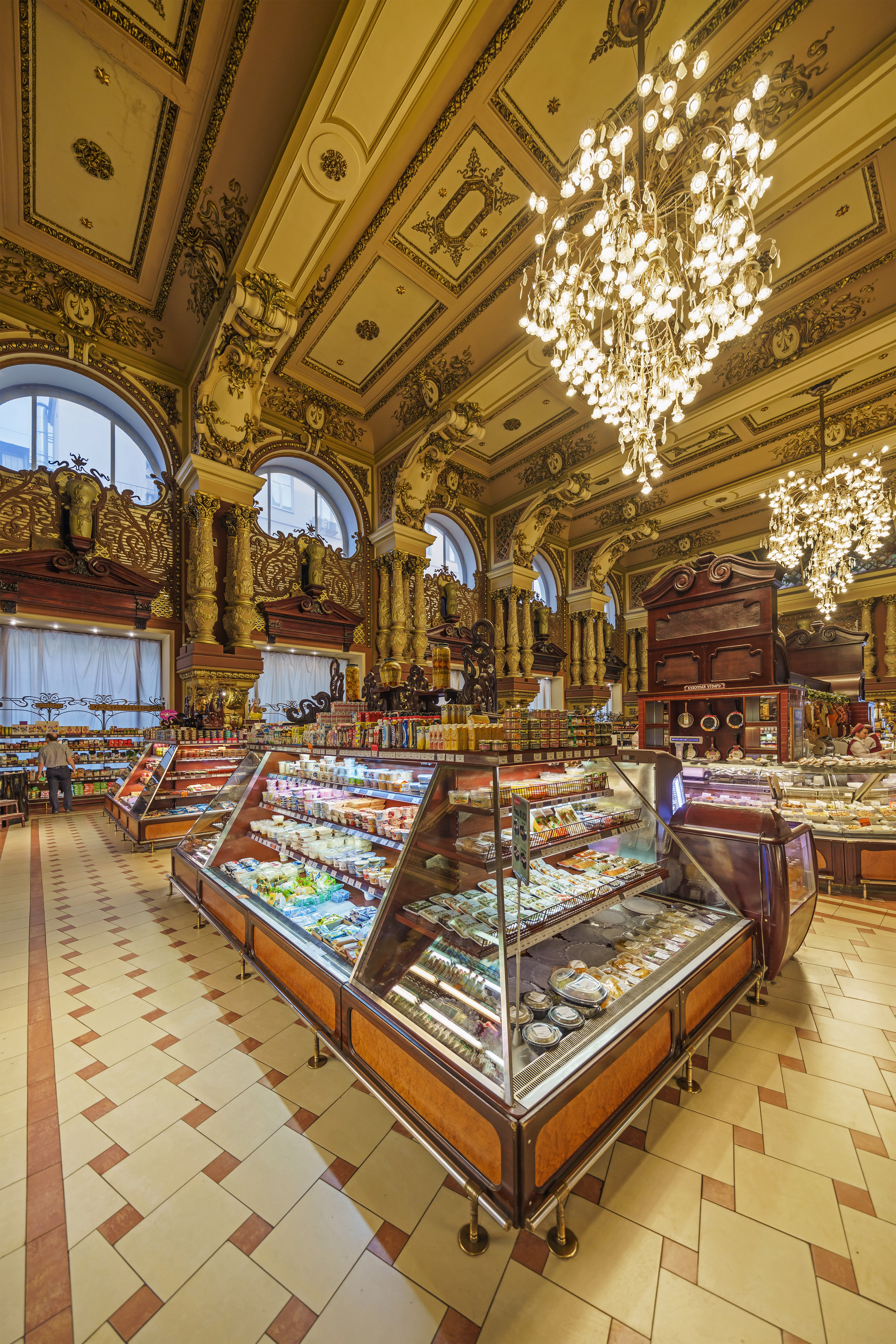
- Type: Private
- Industry: Retail
- Founded: 1901; 125 years ago
- Headquarters: Moscow

Eliseyevsky (Russian: Елисеевский) is a grocery store in Moscow in a historic building on the corner of Tverskaya Street and Kozitsky Lane.

== History ==
=== Selection and reconstruction of premises ===
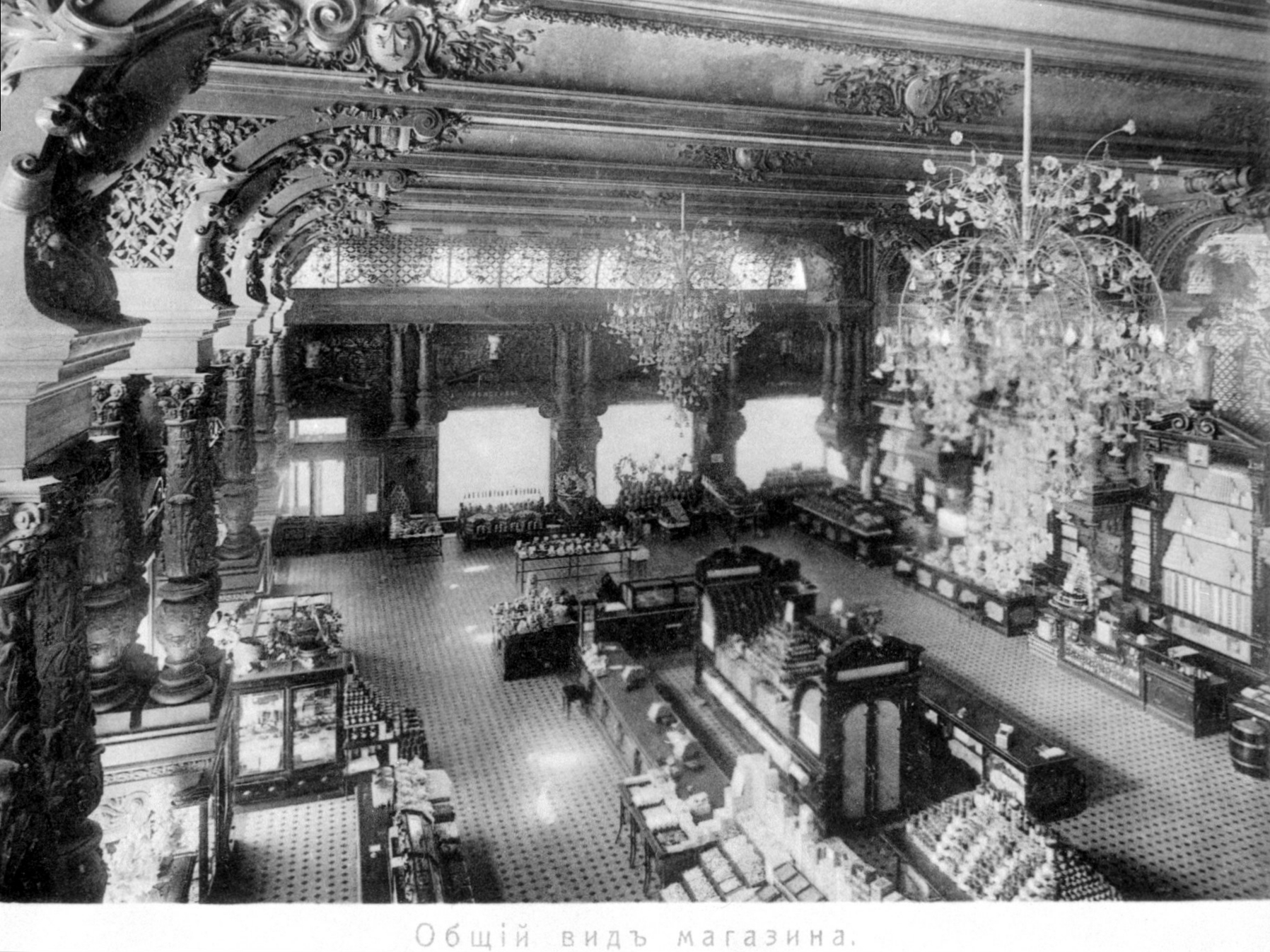
View of the store in 1913

The Saint Petersburg-based merchants, the Eliseevs (owners of the famous Eliseyev Emporium) in Saint Petersburg), made their fortune in the wholesale trade of "colonial goods" - mainly imported fruits; by the second half of the 19th century, the main product of the family partnership was wines imported from Europe, aged and bottled in Russia, other product groups in which the Eliseevs had large turnovers by the end of the 19th century - olive oil (divided at that time, depending on the variety, into "Provencal" and "wood"), coffee, tea, sardines, cheese. The goods were sold both wholesale and in their retail outlets, but the Eliseevs did not have large stores. When selecting premises for a large store in Moscow, Grigory Eliseev, who became the sole head of the partnership in 1896, looked at various buildings on Arbat, Petrovka, Bolshaya Dmitrovka, and settled on the former Kozitskaya mansion on Tverskaya on the recommendation of Moscow City Duma member Alexander Guchkov. In the building, which had changed owners four times over the last 20 years before Eliseev's purchase, the first floor housed a large Korpus tailor's shop with mirrored windows, and the second floor housed apartments for wealthy city residents. The deal to purchase the building took place on August 5, 1898, and on October 23, architect Baranovsky's project for reconstructing the building into a store was presented to the city authorities. Baranovsky directly supervised the reconstruction project, Eliseev gave him autonomy in matters of purchasing materials, hiring and firing workers, architects Vladimir Voeikov and Marian Peretyatkovich were involved in the design of the interiors.

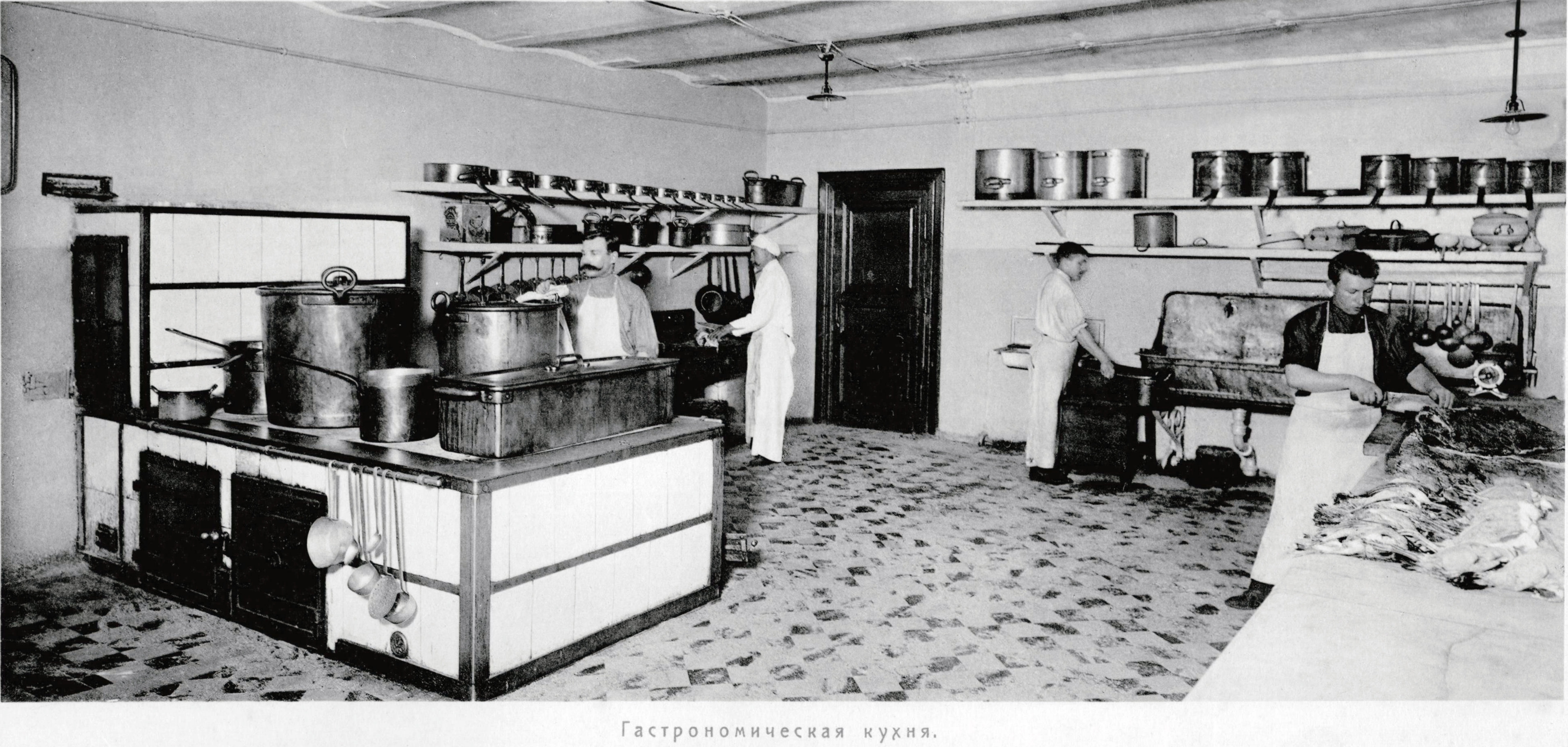
View of the gastronomy section, 1913

The reconstruction lasted three years, during which time the house was covered with dense wooden scaffolding, which was not previously practiced in Russia and ensured the interest of the townspeople in the construction, including giving rise to rumors about the non-standard purpose of the premises. The main reconstruction that the mansion underwent was the unification of the first and second floors (the "basement" and "dress circle" in 19th-century terms), the high rooms thus formed housed retail spaces. As a result, the white marble staircase, which had existed since the building was built in the late 18th century, was lost. The arched entrance to the courtyard from Tverskaya Street was converted into the main entrance to the store. While the facades facing Tverskaya were largely preserved, the outer walls on the Kozitsky Lane side underwent significant changes: they were fitted with 5 large semicircular windows connecting the first and second floors. The interiors of the retail space were designed in the neo-baroque style: massive figured columns with gilded capitals, arches, ceiling solutions for vaults with covings and large crystal chandeliers were used.

=== Opening ===
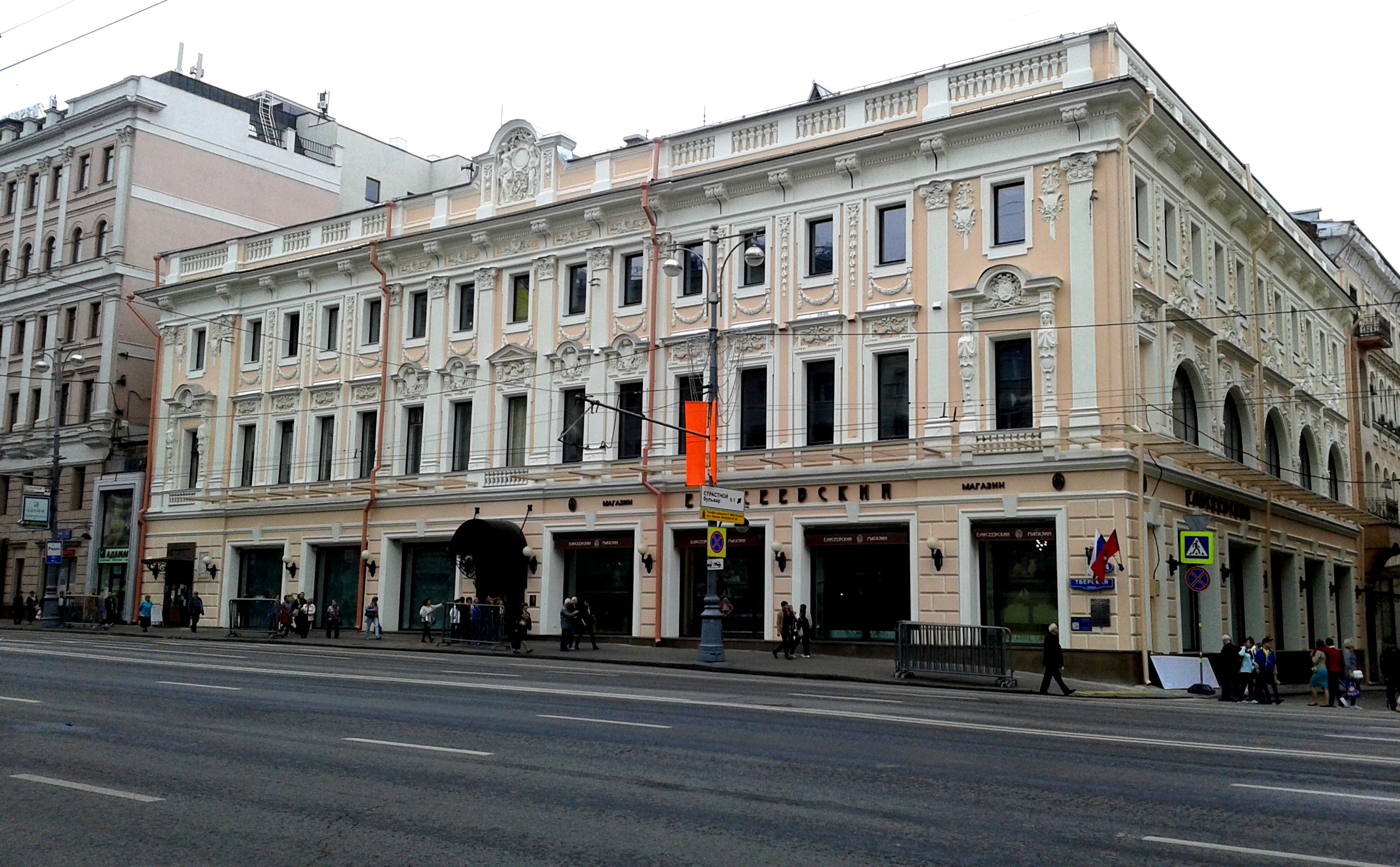
The store's premises at 14 Tverskaya Street

The opening of the "Eliseev Store and Cellars of Russian and Foreign Wines" took place on January 23 (February 5), 1901. The scaffolding was removed only on the morning of the opening day, and a large crowd gathered around the building, looking through the windows at the interiors and the selection of goods in the grocery store; by the start of the opening ceremony, the police had pushed back the street observers. The event was a large-scale affair with a prayer service and a gala dinner, and the Yara Gypsy Choir performed at the end. Invitations for guests were printed on laid paper with a gilded border. Among the guests who attended the ceremony were the Moscow Governor-General Grand Duke Sergei Alexandrovich with his wife Elizaveta Feodorovna, members of the Moscow City Duma, members of the Orthodox clergy, and the founder of Russian winemaking Lev Golitsyn.

The opening ceremony was described in detail by Vladimir Gilyarovsky in one of the stories included in the collection Moscow and Muscovites.

=== The structure ===
The store consisted of three sales areas, which housed five departments. The largest department was the fruit department, other departments were confectionery, colonial-gastronomic, grocery, and a specialized department was set aside for Baccarat crystal. To trade in wine, soon after the opening, it was necessary to organize a separate entrance from the Kozitsky Lane side, since the distance from the main entrance to the Passion Monastery was about 90 m, while by law, wine trade was permitted at a distance of no less than one hundred meters (55 fathoms) from churches.

=== Soviet period ===
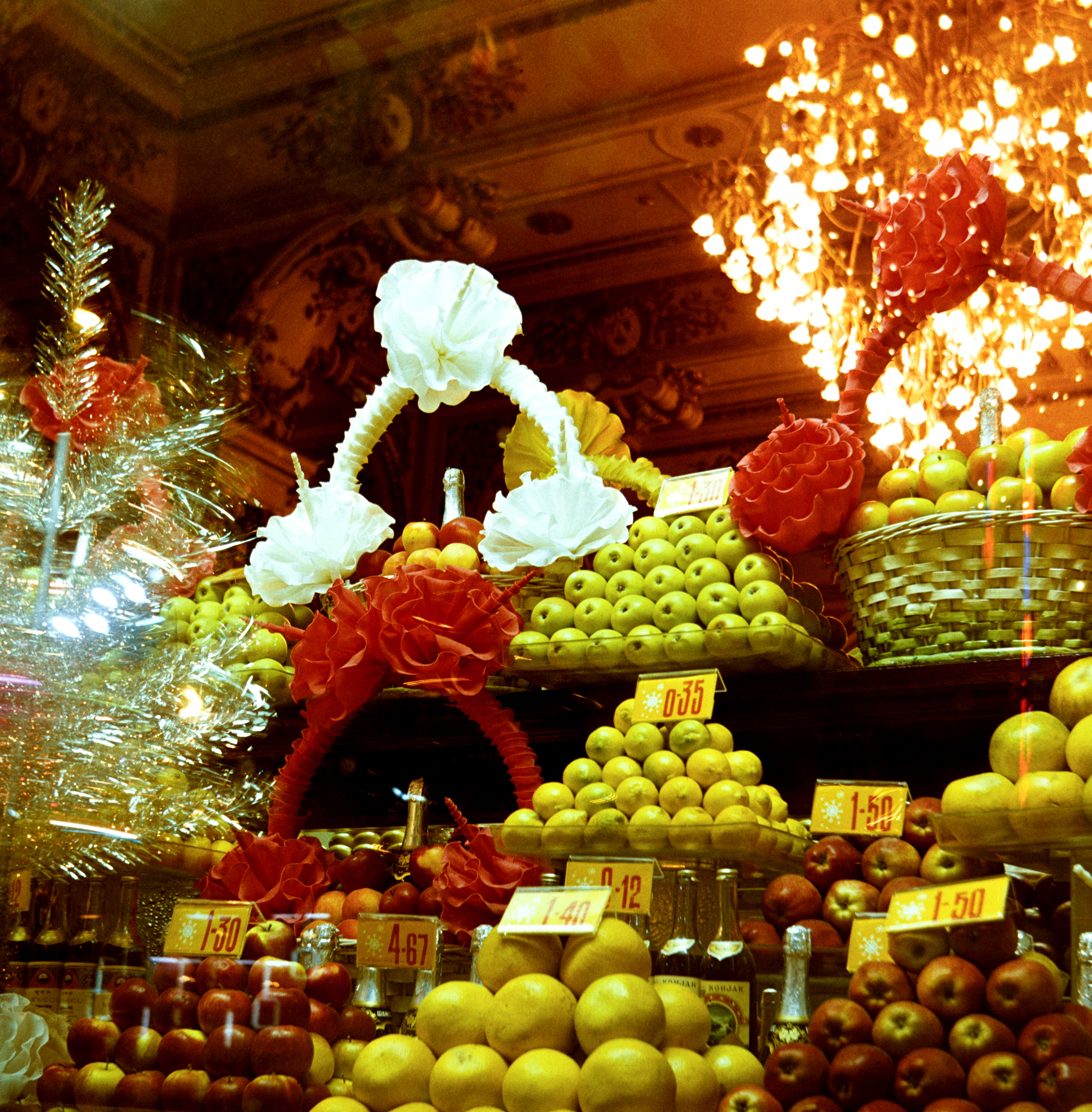
Store interior in 1975

After the October Revolution of 1917, the store operated for only two days, and in 1918 the signs were scrapped. Under the rationing system, the grocery store was virtually out of business in the early years of Soviet power. It was only in 1921, with the implementation of the New Economic Policy, that the grocery store resumed operations in its traditional location and was renamed "Gastronom No. 1". Despite the name change, the grocery store was still identified as "Yeliseevsky", and even in some official documents from the USSR era it was listed as "Gastronom No. 1 "Yeliseevsky"".

In the 1930s, it was mentioned in the context of the development of the food industry in the USSR as an advanced and technically equipped retail store. The grocery store had a wide range of products and exotic products unavailable in other stores; in particular, it was the only place in the USSR where pineapples were freely available in the 1930s.

In the first months of the war, the grocery store, along with all grocery stores in Moscow, switched to a rationing system. During the evacuation panic of October 15–17, 1941, residents took food supplies from warehouses for free. Since 1942, the store was closed to the public and operated as a food distributor for the Soviet nomenklatura.

In 1944, a commercial department opened in the grocery store, trading under the general rationing system for cash, but at extremely high prices. The range of products was as extensive as before the war, and despite the high prices, the grocery store attracted a large crowd of people attracted by the abundance in the conditions of wartime and post-war food shortages, queues at the store on the street, in Kozitsky Lane, began early in the morning, and only a few hours later could the consumer buy rare goods. It is noteworthy that some of the product names in the commercial store were deliberately archaic, not used in Soviet times ("landrin" for candies, "French buns", "Jewish sausage"). Among the regular visitors to the commercial department was Alexander Vertinsky, who lived nearby on Gorky Street. In the 1950s, the head of the commercial department, Ushakov, was convicted of unearned income in the amount of 700 thousand Soviet rubles, earned by deceiving customers.

In the 1960s–1980s, the grocery store was one of the few grocery stores in Moscow that stayed open until 10:00 p.m. (all other stores closed two to three hours earlier).

In 1972, Yuri Sokolov was appointed director of the store, having previously worked at the grocery store for ten years as deputy director. Under his leadership, modern warehouse equipment was purchased in Finland, which made it possible to significantly reduce storage losses, which made it possible to remove some products from accounting when applying established standards, and turnover tripled during his years of leadership. In the context of the simultaneous growth of Muscovites' purchasing power and food shortages in the 1970s, primarily for rare and gourmet goods, Gastronom No. 1, both due to its large scale and central location, and thanks to Sokolov's connections, became a major point of closed and illegal distribution of products. Caviar, Balyk, smoked sausages, and exotic fruits, which were withdrawn from open trade, were sold from the service entrance to a limited circle of people on favorable terms or as payment for some services. One example of this type of relationship was the "evenings of relaxation" organized for the grocery store workforce with performances by famous Soviet artists, who, instead of a fee, received the opportunity to purchase food products that were not available for open sale.

==== Yeliseyevsky affair ====
Shortly before the death of General Secretary Leonid Brezhnev in 1982, the KGB began surveillance of Director Sokolov, secretly equipping his office with microphones and television surveillance, which resulted in the discovery of subordinates handing him money in envelopes; in late October of that year, the director and his deputy Nemtsev, as well as department heads Svezhinsky, Yakovlev, Konkov and Grigoriev, were arrested on charges of "large-scale theft of food products and bribery". Sokolov initially denied the charges, presumably counting on the patronage of high-ranking buyers who purchased rare goods from the service entrance on Kozitsky Lane. Among them were Galina Brezhneva and her husband, Deputy Minister of Internal Affairs Yuri Churbanov, and almost all the leaders of the Moscow City Council. However, after Brezhnev's death and the beginning of the arrests of employees of the Ministry of Trade and directors of Moscow stores close to Churbanov, Sokolov began to give frank testimony, revealing, among other things, the recipients of his bribes among the Soviet leaders. The main sums of bribes were passed through the head of the Main Trade Department of the Moscow City Executive Committee and deputy of the Supreme Soviet of the USSR Nikolai Tregubov, who was also arrested. The case was fully investigated by the KGB without involving the police, quickly grew and gave rise to a cascade of criminal cases around the entire system of Moscow trade, as a result of which more than 15 thousand people were brought to criminal responsibility, and 174 officials were arrested on charges of bribery and theft of state property, among those arrested were the directors of the central grocery stores of Moscow - Novoarbatsky, Smolensky, and the grocery store in GUM. The trial of the "Yeliseyev case" took place in November 1984, Sokolov, who pleaded guilty, was sentenced to death, Tregubov was sentenced to 15 years in prison, and the deputies and heads of departments of Gastronom No. 1 were sentenced to 11–14 years in prison. A month after the court's verdict, Sokolov was executed.

As of 2011, the case has not been declassified and detailed information about the progress and results of the investigation is unknown. It is widely believed that the main motive for the persecution of the heads of Gastronom No. 1 and officials of the capital's trade system was the political struggle between Yuri Andropov, who was vying for the post of General Secretary, and his competitor, the First Secretary of the Moscow City Party Committee Viktor Grishin, whose close circle included exposed corrupt officials.

=== Modern period ===
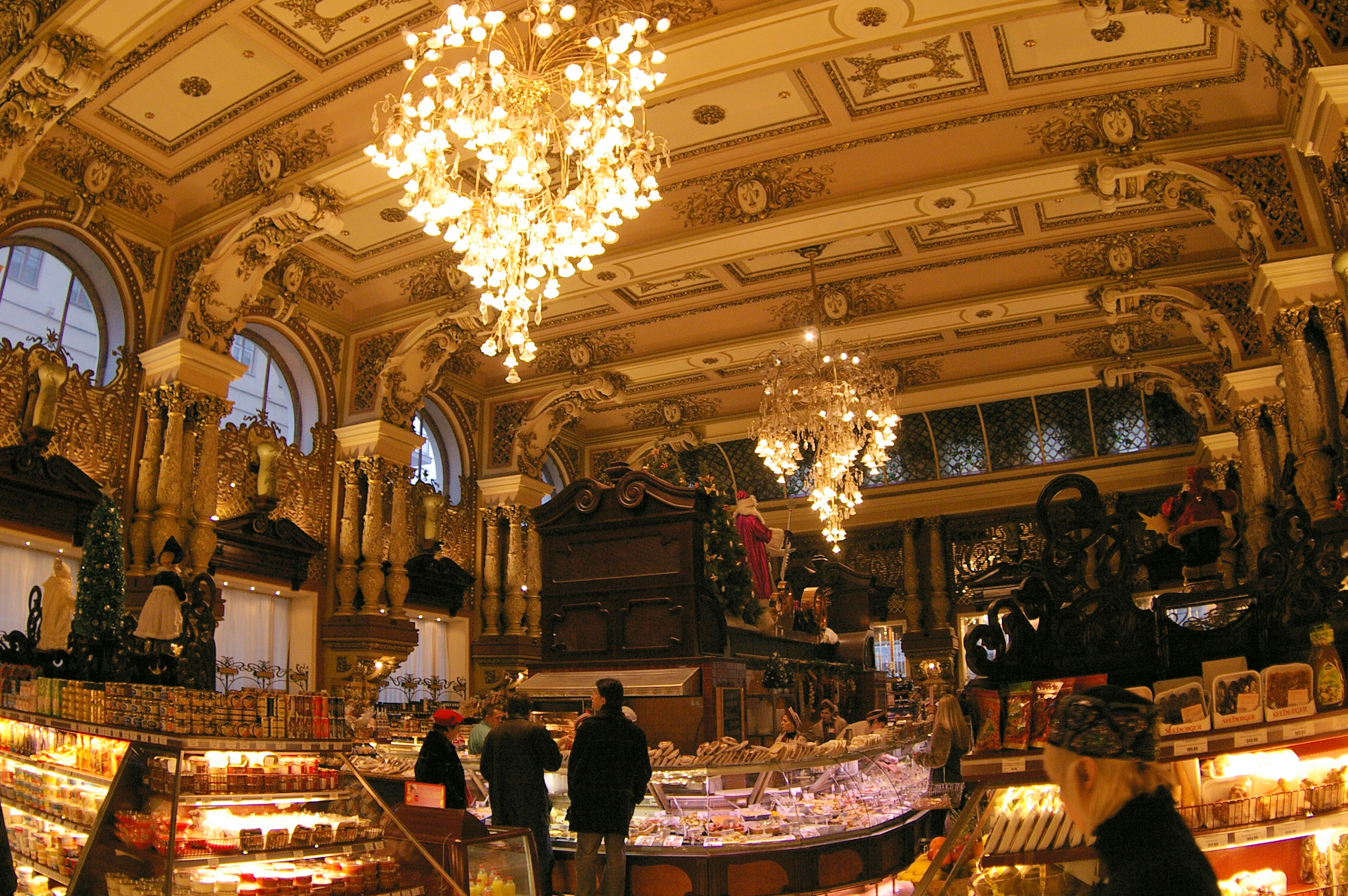
Store interior in 2006

In 1992, the grocery store was privatized, and the shares were transferred to the workforce, and, despite low commercial results, unlike most grocery stores in central Moscow, it retained its profile. In 2002, the shares were bought from the workforce by the structures of businessman Yakubov, and the new owner sublet part of the premises. In 2003, the grocery store was renovated and reformatted into a supermarket in the remaining area, and in the period 2005–2021, the retail operator of the store was the Alye Parusa retail chain.

By the second half of the 1990s, the store became practically the only grocery store in the area, since after the end of the five-year restriction on the re-profiling of retail enterprises privatized in 1992–1993, many stores in the center of Moscow preferred to use the space for more profitable types of business or simply transfer or sell it. In the late 1990s, a cafeteria with alcoholic beverages on tap was opened in the northern part of the grocery store.

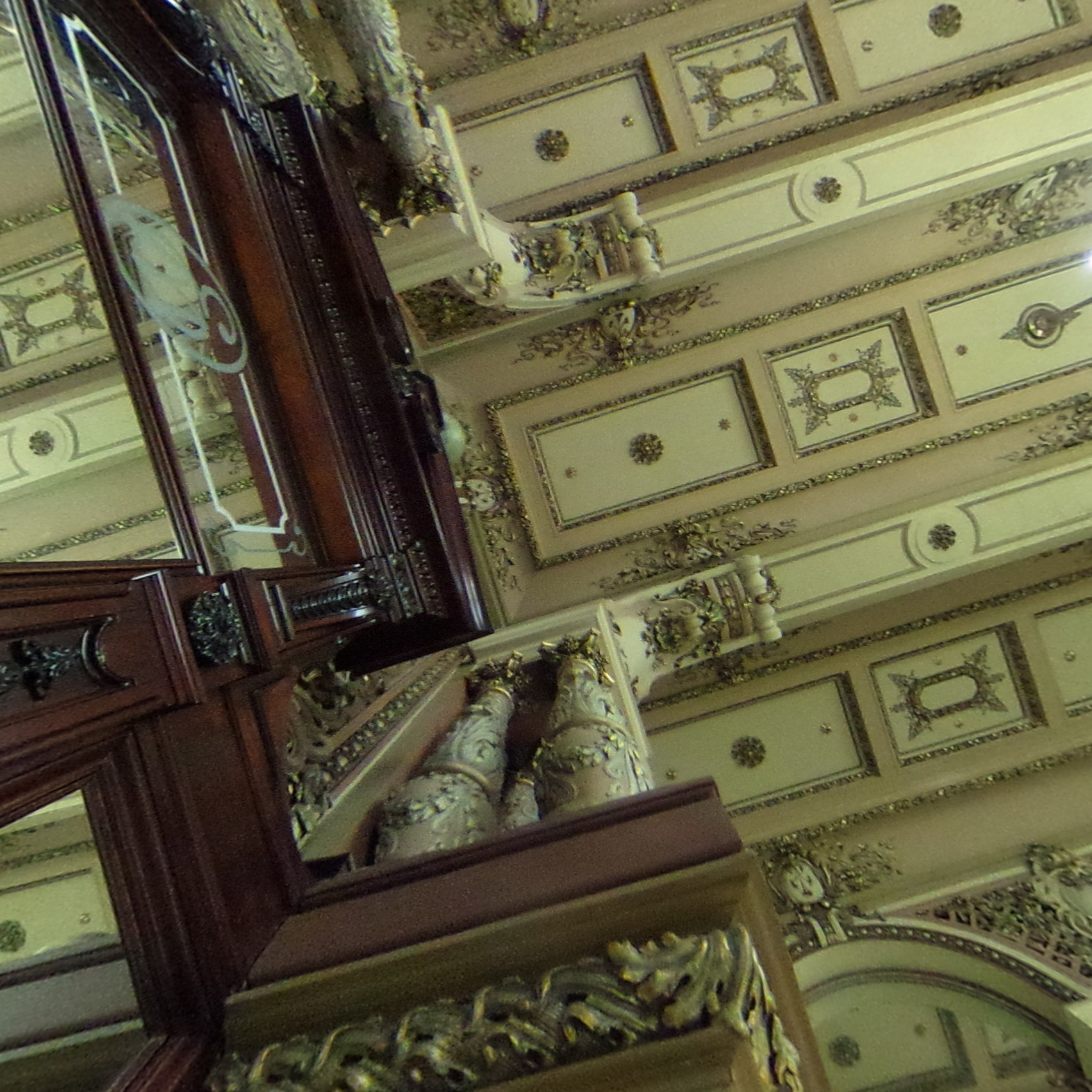
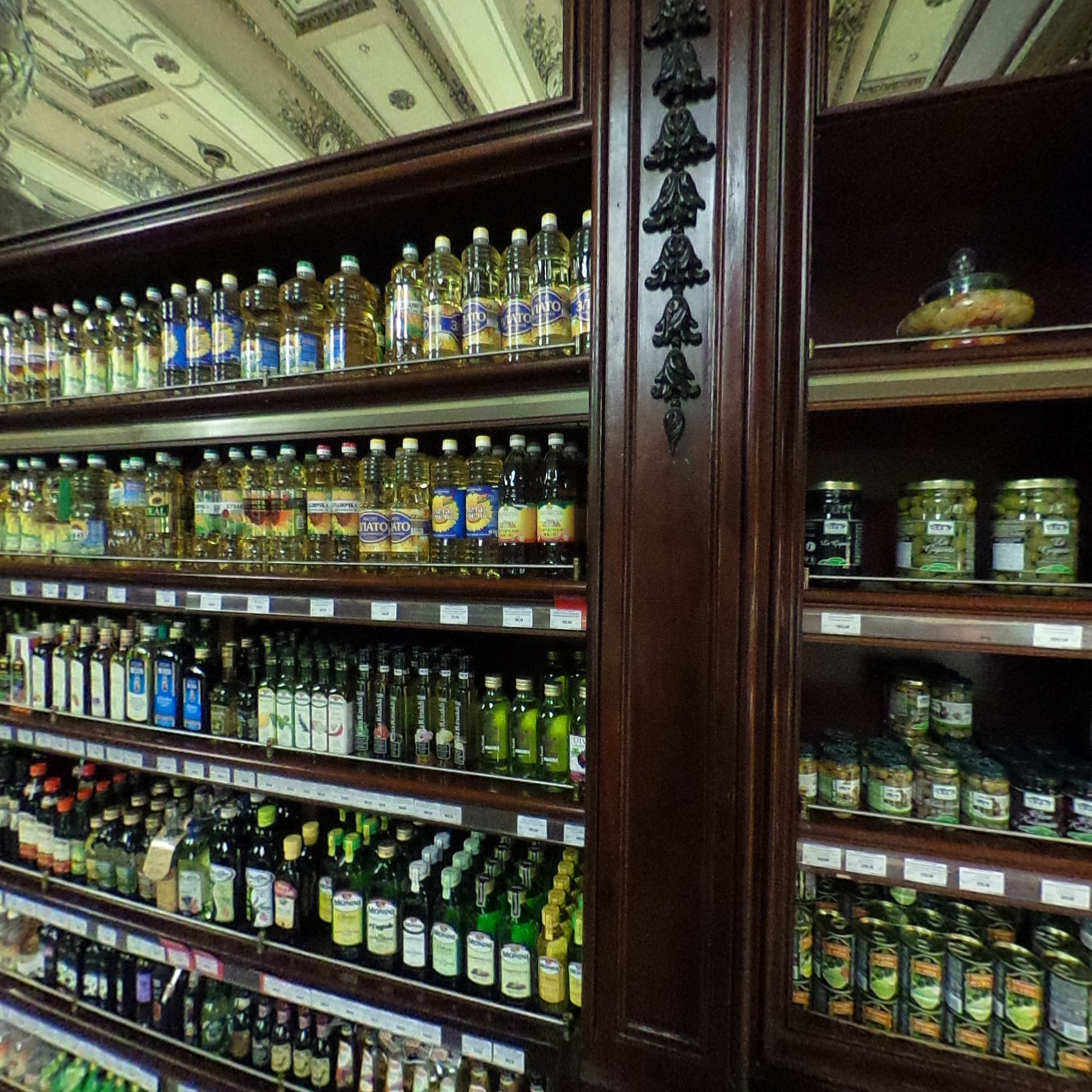
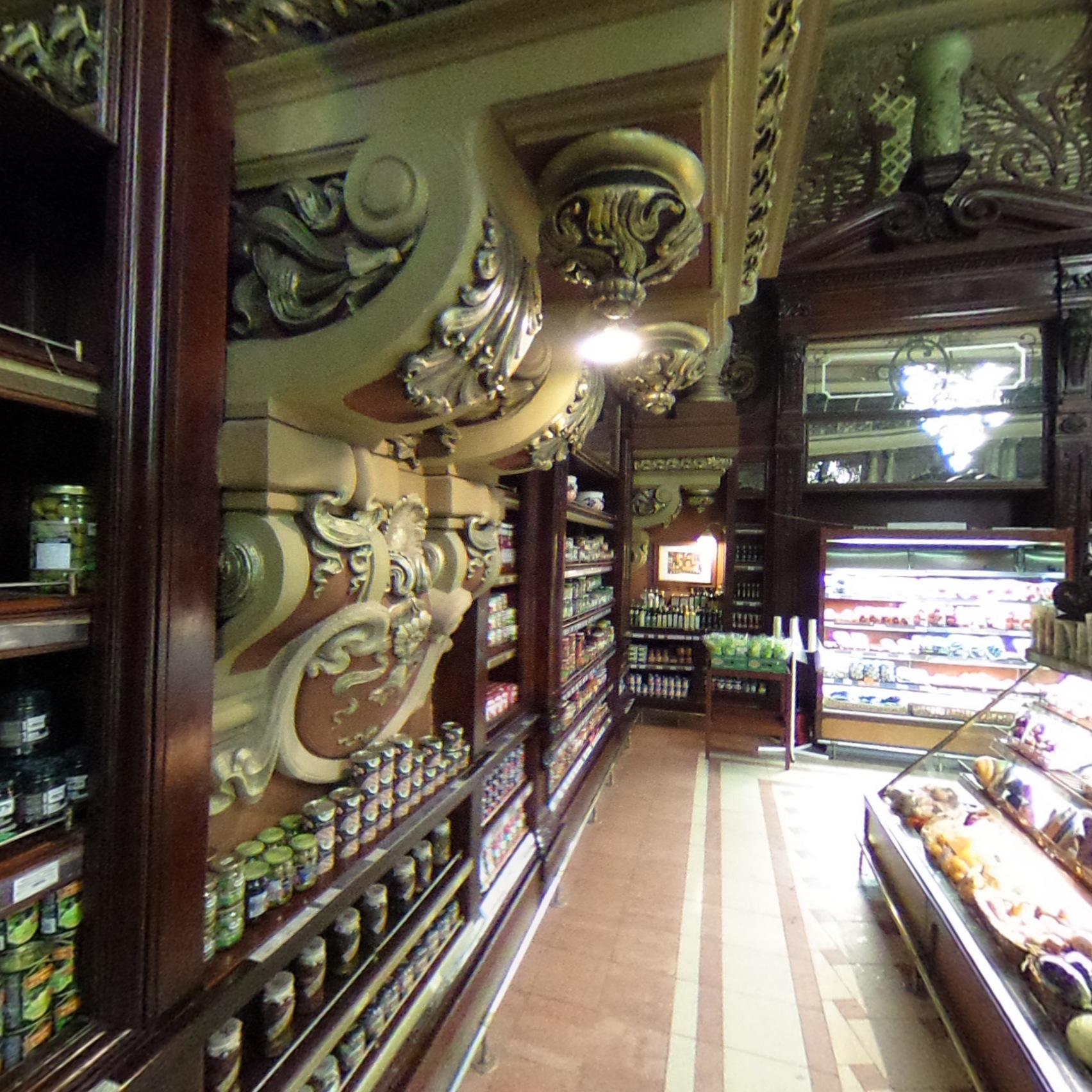
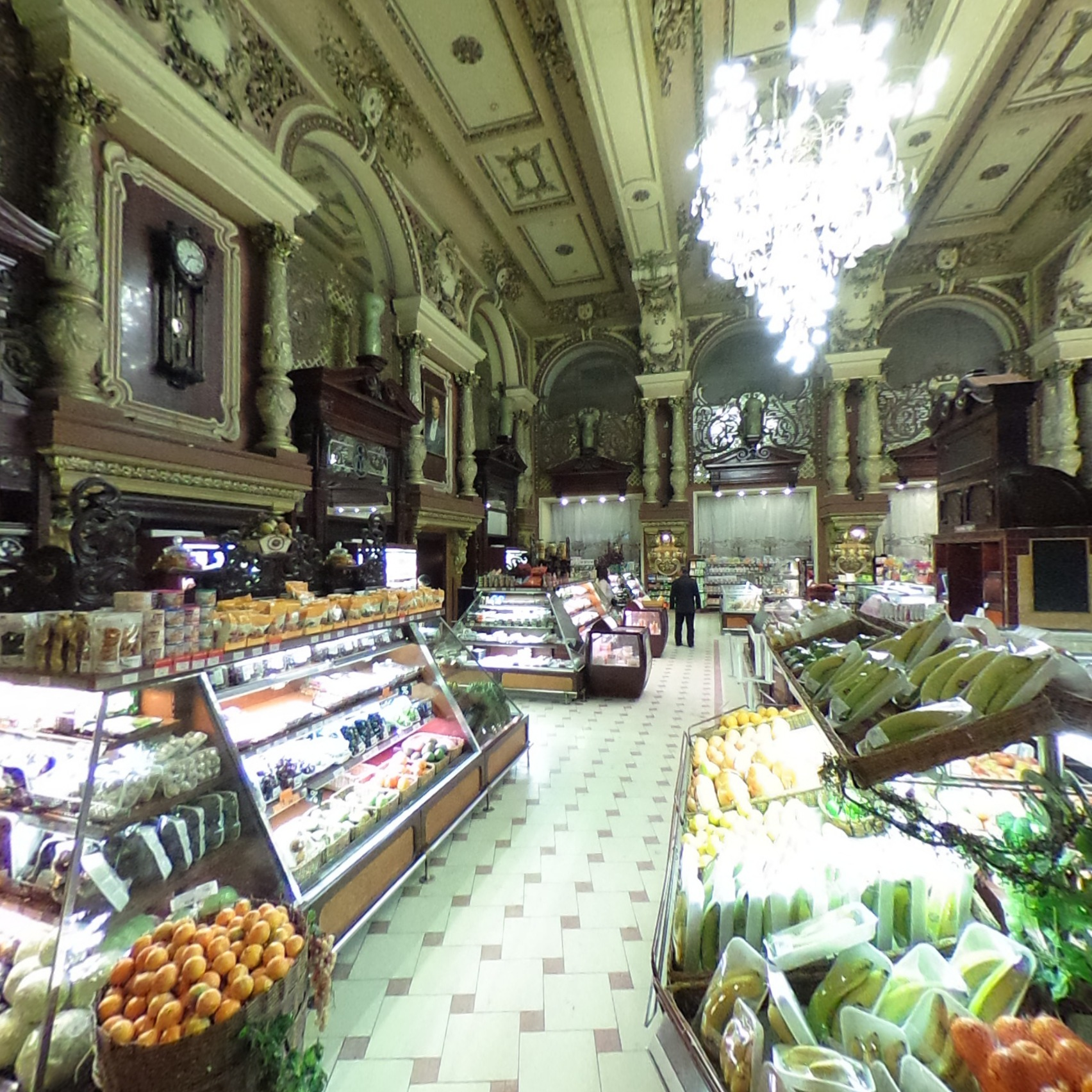
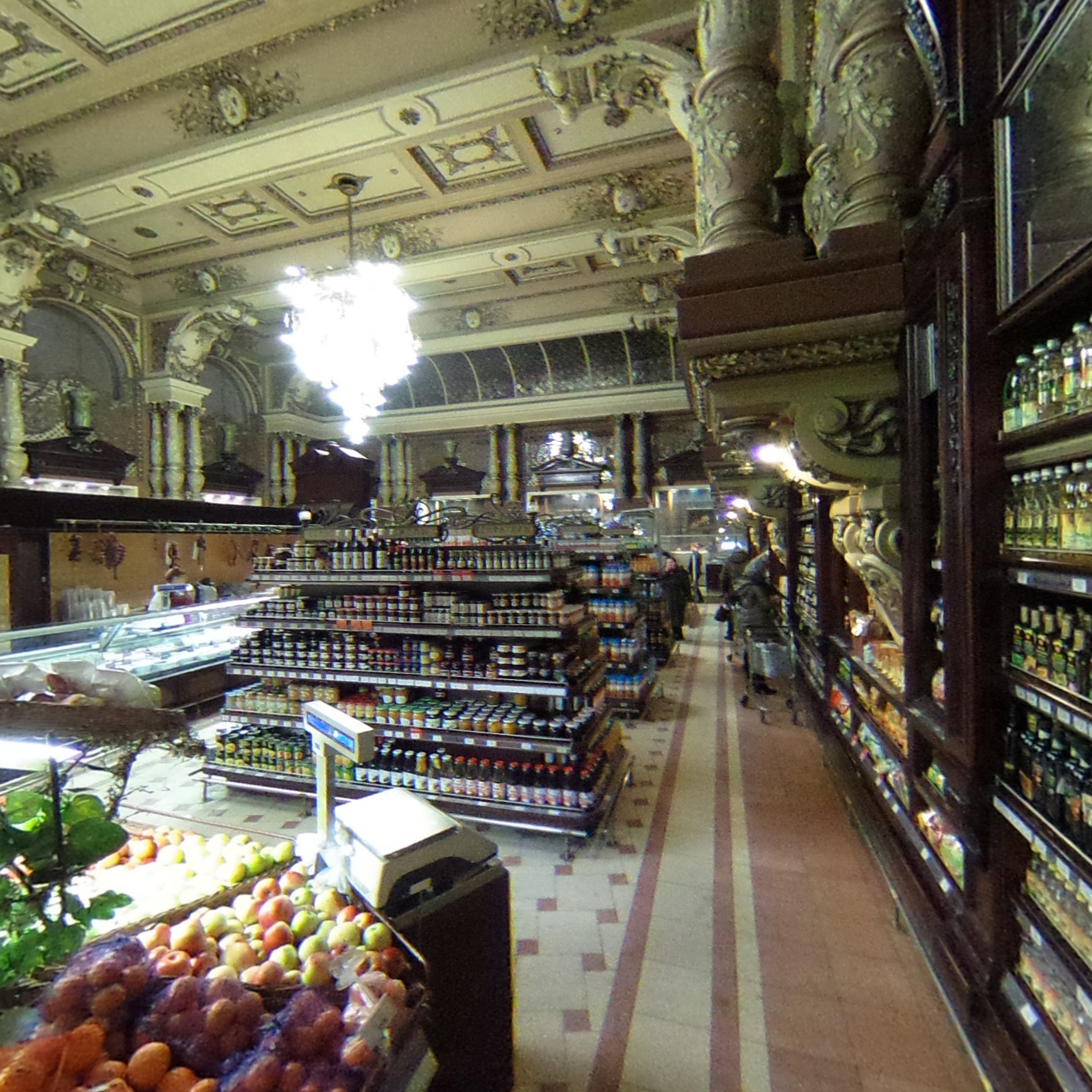
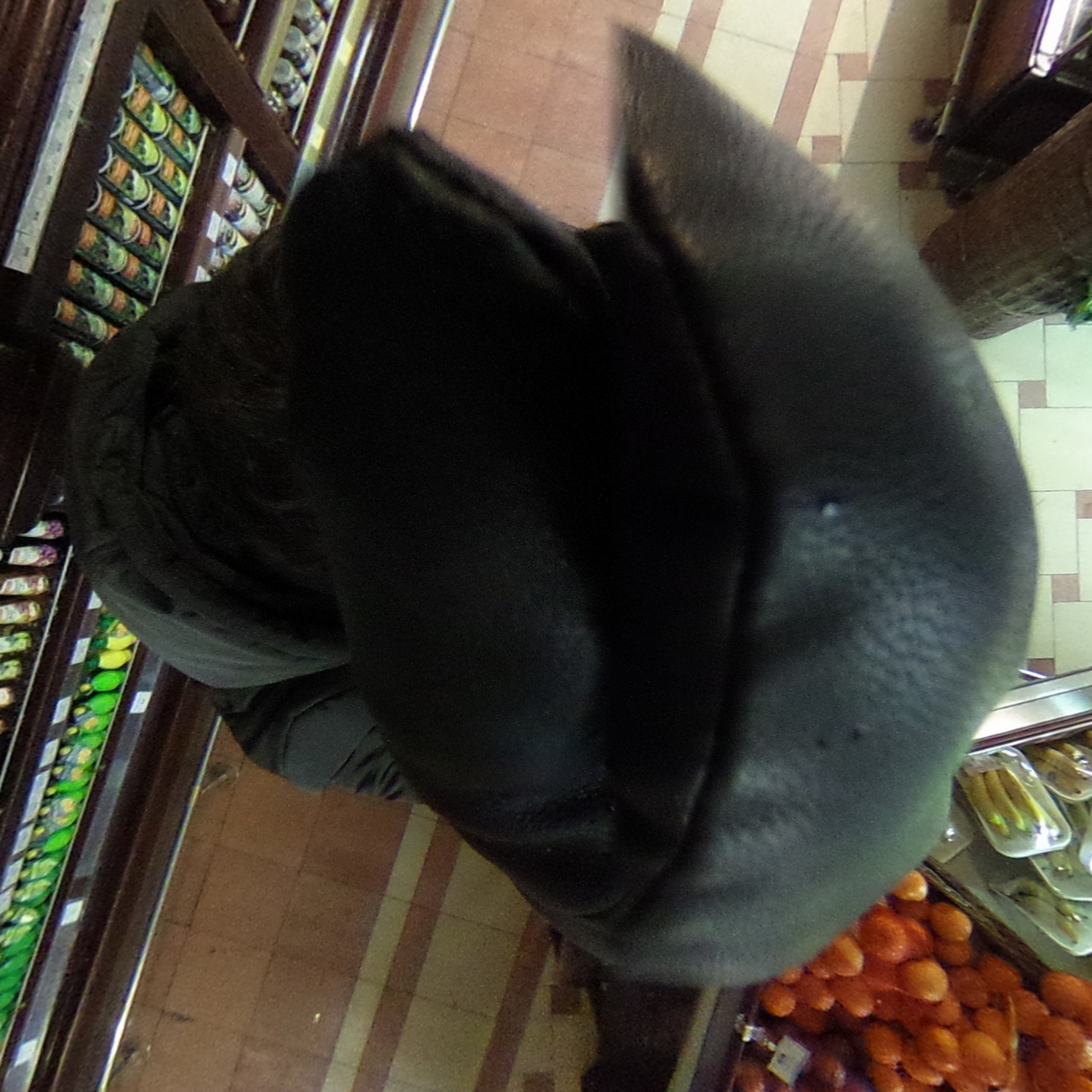
Store interior in 2016.

In 1999, a plan was developed to build a large shopping center on the site of the store and two adjacent residential buildings on Kozitsky Lane, with a total area of 40,000 m^{2}; investments were estimated at $76 million. The project was promoted by the director of the grocery store, Vladimir Trifonov, in particular, he invited Vladimir Gruzdev's Seventh Continent retail chain as co-investors; the project was subsequently rejected as violating historical planning decisions.

The grocery store's performance indicators in the early 2000s were low compared to similar enterprises: daily revenue was about 210 thousand rubles, while the Seventh Continent outlet on Okhotny Ryad, with a smaller area, earned 8 times more, and the store had a reputation among suppliers as an unreliable payer.

In 2002, 90% of the shares of ZAO Eliseevsky Magazin, which had the right to a long-term lease of the grocery store premises, were bought from the workforce by structures of Yakov Yakubov, the owner of a large number of retail spaces on Tverskaya, as well as the Moscow casinos Korona and Golden Palace. The buyout was launched during the vacation of the grocery store director Trifonov, who owned a share of 18.6%. The employees were offered to sell their shares at a favorable price, and in two days the buyers managed to get more than 50%. Under these conditions, Trifonov also agreed to sell his stake, and in a short period of time, Yakubov's structures, having paid about $650 thousand, concentrated about 90% of the company's shares.

The first actions of the new owner were to change the management and develop a project for the reconstruction of the store. In the fall of 2002, the owners announced a competition for an "elite supermarket project" for a 750 m^{2} retail space in the southern part of the premises, but soon abandoned it. The 230 m^{2} space in the northern part with an exit to Tverskaya was subleased in March 2003 to the mid-price chain restaurant "Etazh" for $35,000 per month. It was reported that the owner intended to change the store's specialization and switch to selling clothing and footwear, but this option could not be agreed upon with the Moscow Government, since the grocery store remained essentially the last grocery store in the area.

As of 2003, the store served no more than 1,500 customers per day, and monthly revenue was estimated at $200,000.

If in Soviet times the store premises were redecorated almost every year and the formal appearance was preserved, then during the first period of independence the interiors fell into disrepair: the ceramic floor tiles were worn out, the plaster was falling off in fragments, the gilded elements were dull, and the existing lighting solution gave the shop a gloomy look.

In the spring of 2003, an investment contract was concluded with the Government of Moscow, providing for the closure of the shop for reconstruction to restore the building and premises, on condition that the main profile - a grocery store - was preserved. The 2003 restoration, initially estimated at $2 million and costing $3 million (excluding the cost of updated retail equipment), restored part of the interior of the store from the time of Grigory Eliseev according to the original drawings. Among the recreated characteristic decorative elements are gilding on the capitals and grilles, stucco moldings, large ceiling crystal chandeliers made in the form of grape vines were restored, and the Metlakh floor tiles were replaced. In the center of the sales area, a high mahogany display counter was reconstructed, installed when the store opened, and painted over with black paint in Soviet times. The wine department was restored in the same room where it was located at the beginning of the 20th century, but the entrance to it is organized not from Kozitsky Lane, as it was in Eliseev's time, but from the main food sales area. As a result of the restoration, the store's format was changed: if throughout its existence the goods were displayed in display cases near the counters and behind the counters where the salespeople worked, then since 2004 the store has become a 24-hour department store, where customers themselves collect goods into baskets and pay at the checkout (in the central sections, where the weighed and culinary products of its own production are sold, the counters behind which the salespeople only weigh the goods have been preserved). Six checkouts have been installed at the exit from the sales area, thereby increasing the throughput capacity to 3.5 thousand customers per day.

As of 2015, the retail area of the grocery store was 820 m^{2}, the store premises, owned by the city and encumbered by lease agreements with a retail enterprise, are being prepared by the Moscow Government for free sale. Following the departure of the operator due to the unresolved ownership status of the premises, the store has been closed for an indefinite period since April 2021.

== See also ==
- Public grocery store
