= List of rulers of Madagascar =

This is a list of rulers and office-holders of Madagascar.

== Kingdom of Imerina ==
Below is a list of the line of Merina monarchs that ruled in the Central Highlands of Madagascar and from whom were issued the first true monarchs of a united Kingdom of Merina:

- Andrianerinerina* (Son of God incarnate. According to popular belief, descended from the skies and established his kingdom at Anerinerina)
- Andriananjavonana*
- Andrianamponga I*
- Andrianamboniravina*
- Andriandranolava (Andranolava)*
- Andrianampandrandrandava (Rafandrandrava)*
- Andriamasindohafandrana (Ramasindohafandrana)*
- Rafandrampohy*
- Andriampandramanenitra (Rafandramanenitra)*
- Queen Rangita (Rangitamanjakatrimovavy) (1520–1530)
- Queen Rafohy (1530–1540)
- King Andriamanelo (1540–1575)
- King Ralambo (1575–1612)
- King Andrianjaka (1612–1630)
- King Andriantsitakatrandriana (1630–1650)
- King Andriantsimitoviaminandriandehibe (1650–1670)
- King Andrianjaka Razakatsitakatrandriana (1670–1675)
- King Andriamasinavalona (Andrianjakanavalondambo) (1675–1710)
- King Andriantsimitoviaminiandriana Andriandrazaka (Andriantsimitoviaminandriandrazaka) (1710–1730)
- King Andriambelomasina (1730–1770)
- King Andrianjafynandriamanitra (Andrianjafinjanahary or Andrianjafy) (1770–1787)
- King Andrianampoinimerina (1787–1810)

== Monarchs of the Kingdom of Madagascar (1810–1897) ==
Name	Lifespan	Reign start	Reign end	Notes	Family	Image
Radama I: the Great	1793 – 27 July 1828 (aged 35)	6 July 1810	27 July 1828	Son of Andrianampoinimerina	Merina	Radama I of Madagascar
Ranavalona I	1778 – 16 August 1861 (aged 83)	1 August 1828	16 August 1861	Wife of Radama I	Merina	Ranavalona I of Madagascar
Radama II	23 September 1829 – 12 May 1863 (aged 33)	16 August 1861	12 May 1863 (murdered)	Son of Ranavalona I	Merina	Radama II of Madagascar
Rasoherina	1814 – 1 April 1868 (aged 54)	12 May 1863	1 April 1868	Wife of Radama II	Merina	Rasoherina of Madagascar
Ranavalona II	1829 – 13 July 1883 (aged 54)	1 April 1868	13 July 1883	Wife of Radama II	Merina	Ranavalona II of Madagascar
Ranavalona III	22 November 1861 – 23 May 1917 (aged 55)	30 July 1883	28 February 1897 (deposed)	Niece of Ranavalona II	Merina	Ranavalona III of Madagascar

== After the fall ==
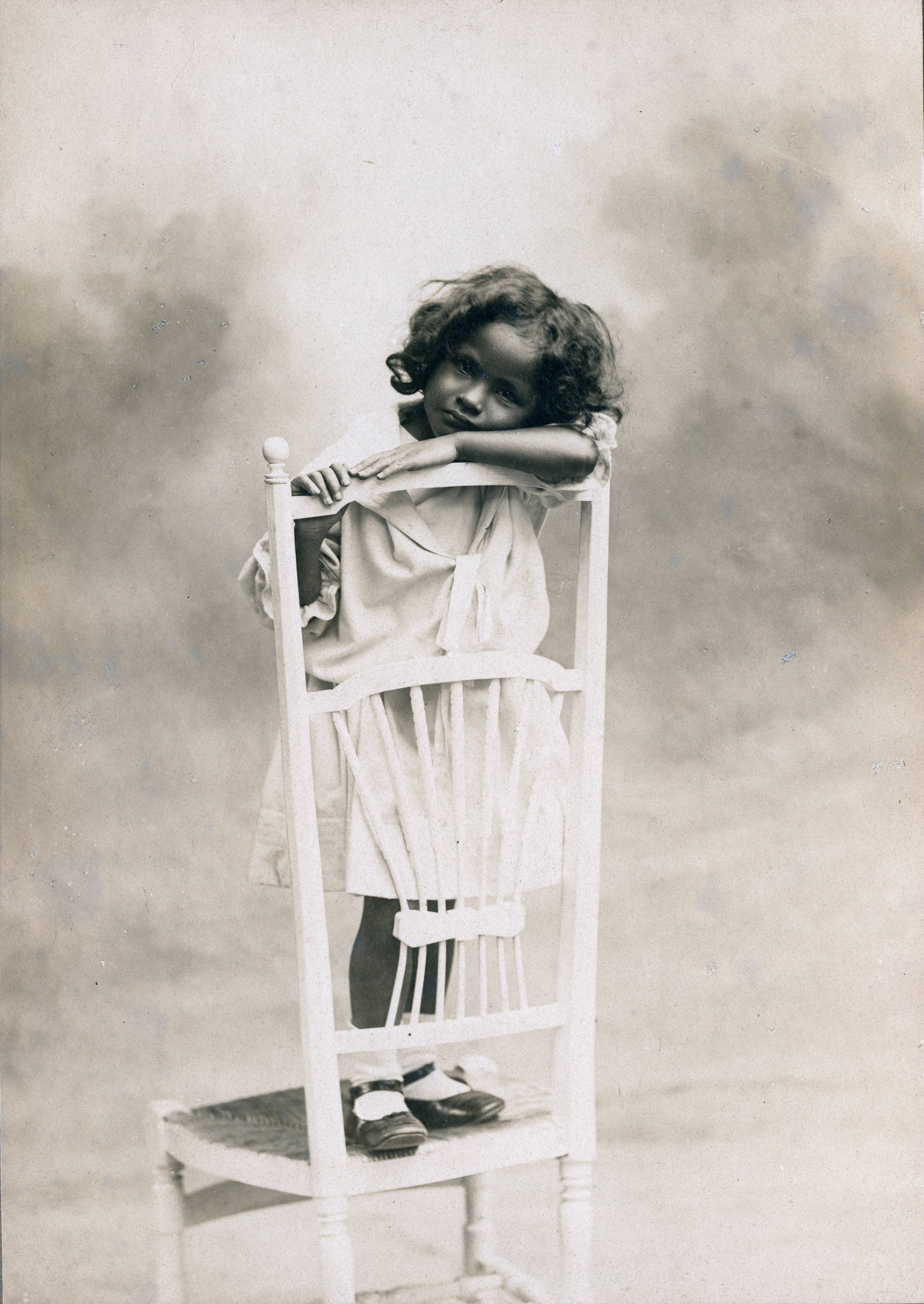
Niece and heir apparent of the Queen Ranavalona III, Marie-Louise, in 1900

After the fall of the Royal House, and the death of the last ruling Sovereign, Queen Ranavalona III's heir apparent, Princess Marie-Louise of Madagascar, remained. She died childless in 1948 Protectorate

== French Madagascar ==
Nº	Portrait	Name (Birth–Death)	Term of Office		Political Party
Malagasy Protectorate (1882–1897)
1		Jules Grévy (1807–1891)	1882	2 December 1887	Independent politician
2		Maurice Rouvier (1842–1811)	2 December 1887	3 December 1887	Independent
Colony of Madagascar and Dependencies (1897–1958)
3		Marie François Sadi Carnot (1837–1894)	3 December 1887	25 June 1894†	Opportunist Republican
4		Charles Dupuy (1851–1923)	25 June 1894	27 June 1894	Independent
5		Jean Casimir-Perier (1847–1907)	27 June 1894	16 January 1895	Opportunist Republican
—		Charles Dupuy (1851–1923)	16 January 1895	17 January 1895	Independent
6		Félix Faure (1841–1899)	17 January 1895	16 February 1899†	Opportunist Republican; Progressive Republican
—		Charles Dupuy (1851–1923)	16 February 1899	18 February 1899	Independent
7		Émile Loubet (1838–1929)	18 February 1899	18 February 1906	Democratic Republican Alliance
8		Armand Fallières (1841–1931)	18 February 1906	18 February 1913	Democratic Republican Party
9		Raymond Poincaré (1860–1934)	18 February 1913	18 February 1920	Democratic Republican Party
10		Paul Deschanel (1855–1922)	18 February 1920	21 September 1920	Democratic Republican and Social Party
11		Alexandre Millerand (1859–1943)	21 September 1920	11 June 1924	Independent
12		Frédéric François-Marsal (1874–1958)	11 June 1924	13 June 1924	Independent
13		Gaston Doumergue (1863–1937)	13 June 1924	13 June 1931	Radical-Socialist Party
14		Paul Doumer (1857–1932)	13 June 1931	7 May 1932†	Radical-Socialist Party
15		André Tardieu (1876–1945)	7 May 1932	10 May 1932	Independent
16		Albert Lebrun (1871–1950)	10 May 1932	11 July 1940 (de facto)	Democratic Alliance

== French State (1940–1944) ==
=== Chief of State ===
Vichy collaborationist

Nº	Portrait	Name (Birth–Death)	Term of Office		Political Party
17		Philippe Pétain (1856–1951)	11 July 1940	19 August 1944	Independent

== Provisional Government of the French Republic (1944–1946 ==
Portrait	Chairman	Took office	Left office	Time in office	Party
Charles de Gaulle	Charles de Gaulle (1890–1970)	3 June 1944	26 January 1946	1 year, 268 days	Independent
Félix Gouin	Félix Gouin (1884–1977)	26 January 1946	24 June 1946	118 days	SFIO
Georges Bidault	Georges Bidault (1899–1983)	24 June 1946	28 November 1946	188 days	MRP
Vincent Auriol	Vincent Auriol (1884–1966)	28 November 1946	16 December 1946	18 days (interim)	SFIO
Léon Blum	Léon Blum (1872–1950)	16 December 1946	22 January 1947	37 days	SFIO

== French Fourth Republic (1946–1958) ==
=== Presidents ===
Nº	Portrait	Name	Term of Office; Electoral mandates		Political Party
16		Vincent Auriol (1884–1966)	16 January 1947	16 January 1954	French Section of the Workers' International
17		René Coty (1882–1962)	16 January 1954	8 January 1959	National Centre of Independents and Peasants

== French Madagascar (1958–1959) ==
=== Presidents ===
Political Party:

Nº	Portrait	Name (Birth–Death)	Term of Office; Electoral mandates		Political Party
18		Charles de Gaulle (1890–1970)	8 January 1959	26 June 1960	Union for the New Republic (renamed Union of Democrats for the Fifth Republic in 1967)

== List of rulers of French Madagascar ==
=== Malagasy Protectorate (1882–1897) ===
Incumbent	Tenure
Léon Frédéric Hubert Metzinger	1 May 1895 — 6 May 1895
Jacques Charles René Achille Duchesne	6 May 1895 — 1895
Émile Jean François Régis Voyron	1895 — 1895
Joseph Simon Gallieni	1895 — 1886
Charles Le Myre de Vilers, Plenipotentiary	28 April 1886 to March 1888
Paul Augustin Jean Larrouy, Resident-General	March 1888 to 12 December 1889
Maurice Bompard, Resident-General	12 December 1889 to 11 October 1891
Jean Aurélien Lacoste, Acting Resident-General	11 October 1891 to October 1892
Paul Augustin Jean Larrouy, Resident-General	October 1892 to 8 September 1894
Albert d'Anthouard de Waservas, Acting Resident-General	October 1894
Charles Le Myre de Vilers, Plenipotentiary	14 October 1894 to 1 December 1895
Achille Ranchot, Acting Resident-General	September 1894 to 21 February 1895
Robert Édouard Alphonse Chaloin, Acting Resident-General	February 1895 to 1 December 1895
Hippolyte Laroche, Resident-General	1 December 1895 to 28 September 1896
Joseph Gallieni, Resident-General	28 September 1896 to 31 July 1897

=== Colony of Madagascar and Dependencies (1897–1958) ===
Incumbent	Tenure
Joseph Gallieni, Military Governor (6 Aug. 1896 to 31 Jul. 1897) then Governor-General (31 Jul. 1897 to 11 May 1905)	6 August 1896 to 11 May 1905
Charles Louis Lépreux, Acting Governor-General	11 May 1905 to 1 January 1906
Victor Augagneur, Governor-General	1 January 1906 to 13 December 1909
Hubert Auguste Garbit, Acting Governor-General	13 December 1909 to 16 January 1910
Henri François Charles Cor, Acting Governor-General	16 January 1910 to 31 October 1910
Albert Jean George Marie Louis Picquié, Governor-General	31 October 1910 to 5 August 1914
Hubert Auguste Garbit, Governor-General	5 August 1914 to 24 July 1917
Martial Henri Merlin, Governor-General	24 July 1917 to 1 August 1918
Abraham Schrameck, Governor-General	1 August 1918 to 12 July 1919
Marie Casimir Joseph Guyon, Acting Governor-General	12 July 1919 to 22 June 1920
Hubert Auguste Garbit, Governor-General	22 June 1920 to 13 March 1923
Auguste Charles Désiré Emmanuel Brunet, Acting Governor-General	13 March 1923 to 20 February 1924
Marcel Achille Olivier, Governor-General	20 February 1924 to 30 January 1929
Hugues Jean Berthier, Acting Governor-General	30 January 1929 to 1 May 1930
Léon Henri Charles Cayla, Governor-General	1 May 1930 to 22 April 1939
Léon Maurice Valentin Réallon, Acting Governor-General	22 April 1939 to 10 June 1939
Jules Marcel de Coppet, Governor-General	10 June 1939 to 30 July 1940
Léon Henri Charles Cayla, Governor-General	30 July 1940 to 11 April 1941
Armand Léon Annet, Governor-General	11 April 1941 to 30 September 1942
Robert Grice Sturges, Commander	5 May 1942 to 11 October 1942
Gerald Russell Smallwood, Commander	11 October 1942 to 1945
Anthony Sillery, Occupied Territories Administrator	25 September 1942 to 7 January 1943
Victor Marius Bech, Acting Governor-General	30 September 1942 to 7 January 1943
Paul Louis Victor Marie Legentilhomme, High Commissioner of Free French Possessions in the Indian Ocean	7 January 1943 to 3 May 1943
Pierre de Saint-Mart, Governor-General	3 May 1943 to 27 March 1946
Robert Boudry, Acting Governor-General	27 March 1946 to 19 May 1946
Jules Marcel de Coppet, High Commissioner	19 May 1946 to 23 December 1947
Pierre Gabriel de Chevigné, High Commissioner	February 1948 to 3 February 1950
Robert Isaac Bargues, High Commissioner	3 February 1950 to October 1954
Jean Louis Marie André Soucadaux, High Commissioner	October 1954 to 1 May 1959

== List of officeholders ==
(Dates in italics indicate de facto continuation of office)

No.	Portrait	Name (Birth–Death)	Elected	Term of office		Political party
No.	Portrait	Name (Birth–Death)	Elected	Took office	Left office	Political party
Malagasy Republic (within the French Community)
1		Philibert Tsiranana (1912–1978)	—	1 May 1959	26 June 1960	PSD
Malagasy Republic (independent country)
(1)		Philibert Tsiranana (1912–1978)	1965 1972	26 June 1960	11 October 1972 (resigned.)	PSD
2		André Resampa (1924 — 1993)		26 June 1970	2 July 1970	Independent
3		Alfred Ramangasoavina ( 1917 — 1989)		2 July 1970	21 July 1970	Independent
4		Philibert Raondry ( 1899 — 1990)		21 July 1970	23 July 1970	Independent
5		Jacques Rabemananjara (1913 — 2005)		23 July 1970	25 July 1970	Independent
6		Calvin Tsiebo ( 1902 — 2008)		5 October 1970	7 October 1970	Independent
7		Victor Miadana ( 1920— 2002)		7 October 1970	9 October 1970	Independent
8		Eugène Lechat ( 1929 — 1998)		9 October 1970	11 October 1970	Independent
1		Philibert Tsiranana ( 1912 — 1978)		11 October 1970	11 October 1972	Independent
9		Gabriel Ramanantsoa (1906–1979)	1972 (referendum)	11 October 1972	5 February 1975 (resigned.)	Military
10		Richard Ratsimandrava (1931–1975)	—	5 February 1975	11 February 1975 (assassinated.)	Military
11		Gilles Andriamahazo (1919–1989)	—	12 February 1975	15 June 1975	Military
12		Didier Ratsiraka (1936–)	—	15 June 1975	30 December 1975	Military
12		Didier Ratsiraka (1936–)	1982 1989	30 December 1975	12 January 1992	Military / AREMA
Third Republic of Madagascar
(12)		Didier Ratsiraka (1936–)	—	12 January 1992	27 March 1993	AREMA
13		Albert Zafy (1927–2017)	1992–93	27 March 1993	5 September 1996 (resigned.)	UNDD
14		Norbert Ratsirahonana (1938–)	—	5 September 1996	9 February 1997	AVI
(12)		Didier Ratsiraka (1936–)	1996	9 February 1997	(25 February 2002) 15 July 2002	AREMA
15		Marc Ravalomanana (1949–)	2001 2006	(22 February 2002) 15 July 2002	17 March 2009 (deposed.)	TIM
16		Hyppolite Ramaroson (1951–)	—	17 March 2009		Military
High Transitional Authority
17		Andry Rajoelina (born 1974)	—	(7 February 2009); 17 March 2009	25 January 2014	TGV
Fourth Republic of Madagascar
18		Hery Rajaonarimampianina (born 1958)	2013	25 January 2014	7 September 2018	HVM
19		Rivo Rakotovao (born 1960)	—	7 September 2018	19 January 2019	HVM
17		Andry Rajoelina (born 1974)	2018	19 January 2019	9 September 2023	TGV
20		Herimanana Razafimahefa (born 1957)	—	9 September 2023	9 September 2023	TGV
21		Council of Ministers; Prime Minister: Christian Ntsay (born 1961)	—	9 September 2023	27 October 2023	Independent
22		Richard Ravalomanana (born 1959)	—	27 October 2023	16 December 2023	Independent
17		Andry Rajoelina (born 1974)	2023	16 December 2023	Incumbent	TGV

== First ladies of Madagascar ==
Name	Portrait	Term Began	Term Ended	President of Madagascar
Justine Tsiranana		June 26, 1960	October 11, 1972	Philibert Tsiranana
Marcelle Larguier		October 11, 1972	February 5, 1975	Gabriel Ramanantsoa
Thérèse Ratsimandrava		February 5, 1975	February 11, 1975	Richard Ratsimandrava
Unknown		February 12, 1975	June 15, 1975	Gilles Andriamahazo
Céline Ratsiraka		June 15, 1975	March 27, 1993	Didier Ratsiraka
Thérèse Zafy		March 27, 1993	September 5, 1996	Albert Zafy
Sahondra Rakotondravaly Ratsirahonana		September 5, 1996	February 9, 1997	Norbert Ratsirahonana
Céline Ratsiraka		February 9, 1997	May 6, 2002	Didier Ratsiraka
Lalao Ravalomanana		May 6, 2002	March 17, 2009	Marc Ravalomanana
Mialy Rajoelina		March 17, 2009	January 25, 2014	Andry Rajoelina
Voahangy Rajaonarimampianina		January 25, 2014	September 7, 2018	Hery Rajaonarimampianina
Vacant		September 7, 2018	January 19, 2019	Rivo Rakotovao (acting)
Mialy Rajoelina		January 19, 2019	September 9, 2023	Andry Rajoelina
Vacant		September 9, 2023	December 16, 2023	Christian Ntsay (acting); Richard Ravalomanana (acting)
Mialy Rajoelina		December 16, 2023	Incumbent	Andry Rajoelina

== Vice President ==
The Vice President of Madagascar was a political position in Madagascar during the era of Malagasy Republic.

Position	Name	Took office	Left office	President	Notes
Vice President	Philibert Raondry	May 1959	June 1960	Philibert Tsiranana	
Vice President	Calvin Tsiebo	June 1960	October 1970	Philibert Tsiranana	
1st Vice President	André Resampa	October 1970	February 1971	Philibert Tsiranana	
1st Vice President	Calvin Tsiebo	February 1971	October 1972	Philibert Tsiranana	
2nd Vice President	Jacques Rabemananjara	February 1971	May 1972	Philibert Tsiranana	
3rd Vice President	Victor Miadana	February 1971	May 1972	Philibert Tsiranana	
4th Vice President	Alfred Ramangasoavina	February 1971	May 1972	Philibert Tsiranana	
5th Vice President	Eugène Lechat	February 1971	May 1972	Philibert Tsiranana	

== List ==
No.	Portrait	Name (Birth–Death)	Term of office		Political party					
No.	Portrait	Name (Birth–Death)	Took office	Left office	Political party					
Merina Kingdom
1		Andriamihaja (died 1833)	1828	1833	Independent					
2		Rainiharo (died 1852)	1833	10 February 1852 (died in office.)	Independent					
3		Rainivoninahitriniony (1821–1869)	10 February 1852	14 July 1864 (deposed.)	Independent					
4		Rainilaiarivony (1828–1896)	1864	1895	Independent					
5		Rainitsimbazafy	15 October 1895	September 1896	Independent					
6		Rasanjy (1851–1918)	September 1896	February 1897	Independent					
No.	Portrait	Name (Birth–Death)	Term of office		Political affiliation					
No.	Portrait	Name (Birth–Death)	Took office	Left office	Political affiliation					
French Madagascar (within the French colonial empire and the French Union)
Post abolished (February 1897 – 27 May 1957)
7		Philibert Tsiranana (1912–1978)	27 May 1957	14 October 1958	PSD					
Malagasy Republic (within the French Community)
(7)		Philibert Tsiranana (1912–1978)	14 October 1958	1 May 1959	PSD					
Post abolished (1 May 1959 – 26 June 1960)
No.	Portrait	Name (Birth–Death)	Term of office		Political affiliation					
No.	Portrait	Name (Birth–Death)	Took office	Left office	Political affiliation					
Malagasy Republic (independent)
Post abolished (26 June 1960 – 18 May 1972)
8		Gabriel Ramanantsoa (1906–1979)	18 May 1972	5 February 1975 (resigned.)	Military					
Post abolished (5 February 1975 – 30 December 1975)
Democratic Republic of Madagascar
Post abolished (30 December 1975 – 11 January 1976)
9		Joël Rakotomalala (1929–1976)	11 January 1976	30 July 1976 (died in office.)	AREMA					
10		Justin Rakotoniaina (1933–2001)	12 August 1976	1 August 1977	AREMA					
11		Désiré Rakotoarijaona (born 1934)	1 August 1977	12 February 1988	Military					
12		Victor Ramahatra (born 1945)	12 February 1988	8 August 1991	Military					
13		Guy Razanamasy (1928–2011)	8 August 1991	12 September 1991	AREMA					
Third Republic of Madagascar
(13)		Guy Razanamasy (1928–2011)	12 September 1991	9 August 1993	AREMA					
(13)		Guy Razanamasy (1928–2011)	12 September 1991	9 August 1993	AREMA	14	Francisque Ravony (1942–2003)	9 August 1993	30 October 1995	CSDDM
15		Emmanuel Rakotovahiny (1938–2020)	30 October 1995	28 May 1996	UNDD					
16		Norbert Ratsirahonana (born 1938)	28 May 1996	21 February 1997	AVI					
16		Norbert Ratsirahonana (born 1938)	28 May 1996	21 February 1997	AVI	17	Pascal Rakotomavo (1934–2010)	21 February 1997	23 July 1998	AREMA
16		Norbert Ratsirahonana (born 1938)	28 May 1996	21 February 1997	AVI	18	Tantely Andrianarivo (1954–2023)	23 July 1998	31 May 2002 (Note: Under house arrest by Ravalomanana from 27 May 2002.)	AREMA
19		Jacques Sylla (1946–2009)	(26 February 2002); 27 May 2002	20 January 2007	Independent					
—		Jean-Jacques Rasolondraibe (born 1947)	31 May 2002	5 July 2002	AREMA					
20		Charles Rabemananjara (born 1947)	20 January 2007	17 March 2009 (deposed.)	TIM					
High Transitional Authority
21		Monja Roindefo (born 1965)	(7 February 2009); 17 March 2009	10 October 2009 (13 November 2009)	Monima					
22		Eugène Mangalaza (born 1950)	10 October 2009	18 December 2009	Independent					
—		Cécile Manorohanta	18 December 2009	20 December 2009	TGV					
23		Albert Camille Vital (born 1952)	20 December 2009	2 November 2011	Military					
24		Omer Beriziky (born 1950)	2 November 2011	16 April 2014	LEADER-Fanilo					
24		Omer Beriziky (born 1950)	2 November 2011	16 April 2014	LEADER-Fanilo	Fourth Republic of Madagascar				
25		Roger Kolo (born 1943)	16 April 2014	17 January 2015	Independent					
26		Jean Ravelonarivo (born 1959)	17 January 2015	10 April 2016	Independent					
27		Olivier Mahafaly Solonandrasana (born 1964)	13 April 2016	6 June 2018	Independent					
28		Christian Ntsay (born 1961)	6 June 2018	Incumbent	Independent					

== Colonial Governors ==
Tenure	Incumbent	Notes	Portrait
Malagasy Protectorate (1882–1897)
28 April 1886 to March 1888	Charles Le Myre de Vilers, Plenipotentiary	1st term	
March 1888 to 12 December 1889	Paul Augustin Jean Larrouy, Resident-General	1st term	
12 December 1889 to 11 October 1891	Maurice Bompard, Resident-General		
11 October 1891 to October 1892	Jean Aurélien Lacoste, Acting Resident-General		
October 1892 to 8 September 1894	Paul Augustin Jean Larrouy, Resident-General	2nd term	
October 1894	Albert d'Anthouard de Waservas, Acting Resident-General		
14 October 1894 to 1 December 1895	Charles Le Myre de Vilers, Plenipotentiary	2nd time; served at the start of the Menalamba rebellion	
September 1894 to 21 February 1895	Achille Ranchot, Acting Resident-General	For de Vilers	
February 1895 to 1 December 1895	Robert Édouard Alphonse Chaloin, Acting Resident-General	For de Vilers	
1 December 1895 to 28 September 1896	Hippolyte Laroche, Resident-General		
28 September 1896 to 31 July 1897	Joseph Gallieni, Resident-General		
Colony of Madagascar and Dependencies (1897–1958)
6 August 1896 to 31 July 1897	Joseph Gallieni, Military Governor		
31 July 1897 to 11 May 1905	Joseph Gallieni, Governor-General	Served during the 1904–1905 uprising	
11 May 1905 to 1 January 1906	Charles Louis Lépreux, Acting Governor-General		
1 January 1906 to 13 December 1909	Victor Augagneur, Governor-General		
13 December 1909 to 16 January 1910	Hubert Auguste Garbit, Acting Governor-General	1st term	
16 January 1910 to 31 October 1910	Henri François Charles Cor, Acting Governor-General		
31 October 1910 to 5 August 1914	Albert Jean George Marie Louis Picquié, Governor-General		
5 August 1914 to 14 October 1914	Hubert Auguste Garbit, Acting Governor-General	2nd term	
14 October 1914 to 24 July 1917	Hubert Auguste Garbit, Governor-General	2nd term	
24 July 1917 to 1 August 1918	Martial Henri Merlin, Governor-General		
1 August 1918 to 12 July 1919	Abraham Schrameck, Governor-General		
12 July 1919 to 22 June 1920	Marie Casimir Joseph Guyon, Acting Governor-General		
22 June 1920 to 13 March 1923	Hubert Auguste Garbit, Governor-General	3rd term	
13 March 1923 to 20 February 1924	Auguste Charles Désiré Emmanuel Brunet, Acting Governor-General		
20 February 1924 to 30 January 1929	Marcel Achille Olivier, Governor-General		
30 January 1929 to 1 May 1930	Hugues Jean Berthier, Acting Governor-General		
1 May 1930 to 22 April 1939	Léon Henri Charles Cayla, Governor-General	1st term	
22 April 1939 to 10 June 1939	Léon Maurice Valentin Réallon, Acting Governor-General		
10 June 1939 to 30 July 1940	Jules Marcel de Coppet, Governor-General	1st term	
30 July 1940 to 11 April 1941	Léon Henri Charles Cayla, Governor-General	2nd term	
11 April 1941 to 30 September 1942	Armand Léon Annet, Governor-General	Deposed in the Battle of Madagascar	
5 May 1942 to 11 October 1942	Robert Sturges, Commander	British occupation	
11 October 1942 to 1945	Gerald Smallwood, Commander	British occupation	
25 September 1942 to 7 January 1943	Anthony Sillery, Occupied Territories Administrator	British occupation	
30 September 1942 to 7 January 1943	Victor Marius Bech, Acting Governor-General		
7 January 1943 to 3 May 1943	Paul Louis Victor Marie Legentilhomme, High Commissioner of Free French Possessions in the Indian Ocean		
3 May 1943 to 27 March 1946	Pierre de Saint-Mart, Governor-General		
27 March 1946 to 19 May 1946	Robert Boudry, Acting Governor-General		
19 May 1946 to 23 December 1947	Jules Marcel de Coppet, High Commissioner	2nd term; served at the start of the Malagasy Uprising	
February 1948 to 3 February 1950	Pierre Gabriel de Chevigné, High Commissioner		
3 February 1950 to October 1954	Robert Isaac Bargues, High Commissioner		
October 1954 to 1 May 1959	Jean Louis Marie André Soucadaux, High Commissioner		

== See also ==
- Politics of Madagascar
- List of Imerina monarchs
- List of colonial governors of Madagascar
- Prime Minister of Madagascar
- Vice President of Madagascar
- First Lady of Madagascar
