= List of international prime ministerial trips made by Levi Eshkol =

Levi Eshkol served as the third Prime Minister of Israel from June 1963 and until his death in February 1969. During this time he made 13 official, state and working visits to a total of 11 foreign countries. Eshkol was the first head of government in Israel to be invited formally to the White House. In 1966 he was also the first Israeli prime minister to conduct state visits to Africa.

== Foreign visits made by Levi Eshkol ==
Date	Country	City/Cities visited	Note
May-June 1964	United States of America	Philadelphia; New York City; Cape Kennedy; Houston; El Paso; Los Angeles, Chicago.	First official invitation of an Israeli head of state or government to the White House. Meeting with President Lyndon Johnson.
July-August 1964	France	Paris	Official State Visit and meeting with President Charles de Gaulle. Also met in Paris with Prime Minister of Turkey İsmet İnönü.
May 1965	United Kingdom	London	Official State Visit and meeting with Prime Minister Harold Wilson.
May-June 1966	Kenya	Nairobi	Official State Visit and meeting with President Jomo Kenyatta
May-June 1966	Uganda	Entebbe	Official State Visit and meeting with President Milton Obote
May-June 1966	Republic of the Congo (Léopoldville)	Léopoldville	Official State Visit and meetings with President Joseph-Désiré Mobutu (unofficial) and Prime Minister Léonard Mulamba (official)
May-June 1966	Senegal	Dakar	Official State Visit and meeting with President Léopold Sédar Senghor
May-June 1966	Ivory Coast	Abidjan	Official State Visit and meeting with President Félix Houphouët-Boigny
May-June 1966	Liberia	Monrovia	Official State Visit and meeting with President William Tubman
May-June 1966	Madagascar	Antananarivo	Official State Visit and meeting with President Philibert Tsiranana
January 1968	United States of America	LBJ Ranch; New York City.	Official State Visit and meeting with President Lyndon Johnson
January 1968	Canada	Toronto	Official State Visit and meeting with Prime Minister Lester Pearson
June 1968	United Kingdom	London	Official State Visit and meeting with Prime Minister Harold Wilson

== National and political leaders hosted in Israel by Levi Eshkol ==
Country	Name	Title	Date
Nepal	Mahendra of Nepal	King of Nepal	September 1963
Dahomey	Hubert Maga	President of Dahomey	September 1963
Canada	John Diefenbaker	Former Prime Minister of Canada	September 1963
Mexico	Miguel Alemán Valdés	Former President of Mexico	November 1963
Republic of the Congo (Léopoldville)	Joseph Kasavubu	President of the Democratic Republic of the Congo	December 1963
Barbados	Errol Barrow	Prime Minister of Barbados	December 1963
Vatican	Paul VI	Pope	January 1964
Malta	Dom Mintoff	Former Prime Minister of Malta	January 1964
Belgium	Baudouin of Belgium	King of Belgium	February 1964
Togo	Nicolas Grunitzky	President of Togo	April 1964
Dahomey	Justin Ahomadégbé-Tomêtin	Prime Minister of Dahomey	July 1964 (Note: Received by Deputy Prime Minister Abba Eban as Levi Eshkol was out of the country.)
Iceland	Bjarni Benediktsson	Prime Minister of Iceland	November 1964
Denmark	Jens Otto Krag	Prime Minister of Denmark	January 1965
France	Pierre Mendès France	Former Prime Minister of France	August 1965
Chad	François Tombalbaye	President of Chad	September 1965
Iceland	Ásgeir Ásgeirsson	President of Iceland	March 1966
Botswana	Seretse Khama	Prime Minister of Botswana	April 1966
West Germany	Konrad Adenauer	Former Chancellor of West Germany	May 1966
Nicaragua	René Schick	President of Nicaragua	May 1966 (Note: Received by President Zalman Shazar. Levi Eshkol was out of the country during the visit.)
Gambia	Dawda Jawara	President of Gambia	October 1966
Belgium	Théo Lefèvre	Former Prime Minister of Belgium	October 1966
United Kingdom	Alec Douglas-Home	Former Prime Minister of the United Kingdom	March 1967
Finland	Rafael Paasio	Prime Minister of Finland	May 1967
Madagascar	Calvin Tsiebo	Vice President of the Malagasy Republic	May 1967
West Germany	Ludwig Erhard	Former Chancellor of West Germany	October 1967
Malawi	Hastings Banda	President of Malawi	May 1968
Botswana	Quett Masire	Vice President of Botswana	July 1968
Lesotho	Leabua Jonathan	Prime Minister of Lesotho	November 1968
Canada	Lester Pearson	Former Prime Minister of Canada	December 1968
