= Israel–Madagascar relations =

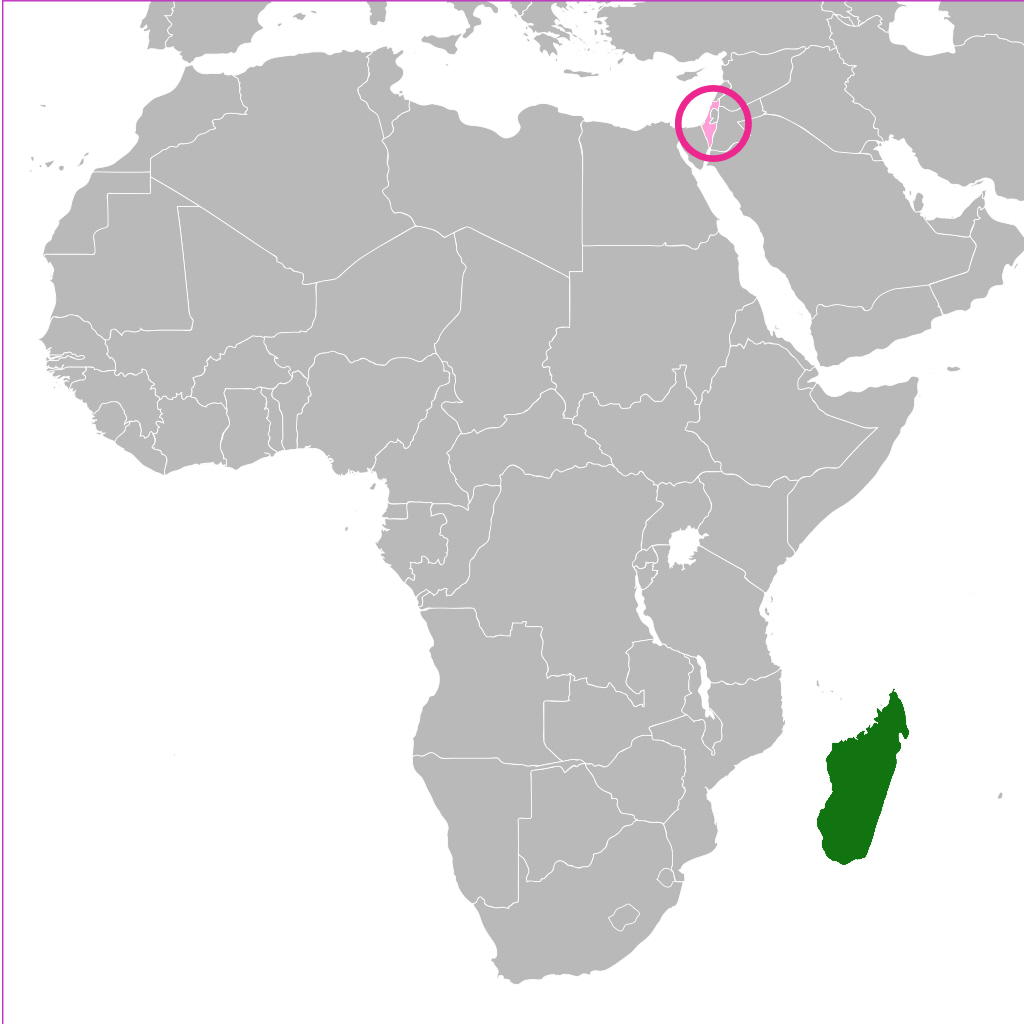
- Madagascar: Israel

Israel–Madagascar relations are the bilateral relations between Israel and Madagascar.

Prior to the severance of diplomatic relations in 1973, Israel maintained an embassy in Antananarivo, while Madagascar operated an embassy in Tel Aviv. At present, Israel's ambassador to South Africa is concurrently accredited to Madagascar, and Madagascar's ambassador to France is concurrently accredited to Israel.

== History ==
Bilateral relations were officially established in 1960 following Madagascar's independence from France. In 1961 President Philibert Tsiranana paid an official visit to Israel.

In May and June 1966 as part of an Israeli initiative to strengthen relations with African countries Prime Minister Levi Eshkol and Foreign Minister Golda Meir undertook a three week tour of the continent which included a visit to Madagascar.

In May 1967 Madagascar's Vice President Calvin Tsiebo paid an official visit to Israel where he was received by Prime Minister Eshkol.

In 1973 following the Yom Kippur War Madagascar like many Sub-Saharan Africa under pressure from Arab states severed diplomatic relations with Israel. Relations were restored in 1994.

In 2017 following an outbreak of plague Israel sent humanitarian assistance to Madagascar including medicines and medical equipment.

In September 2020 the government of Madagascar initiated the creation of a parliamentary caucus of allies of Israel. The new caucus joined the international network of pro Israel parliamentary groups affiliated with the Israel Allies Foundation.

== See also ==
- Foreign relations of Israel
- Foreign relations of Madagascar
