= Victor Miadana =

Malagasy politician (1920–2002)

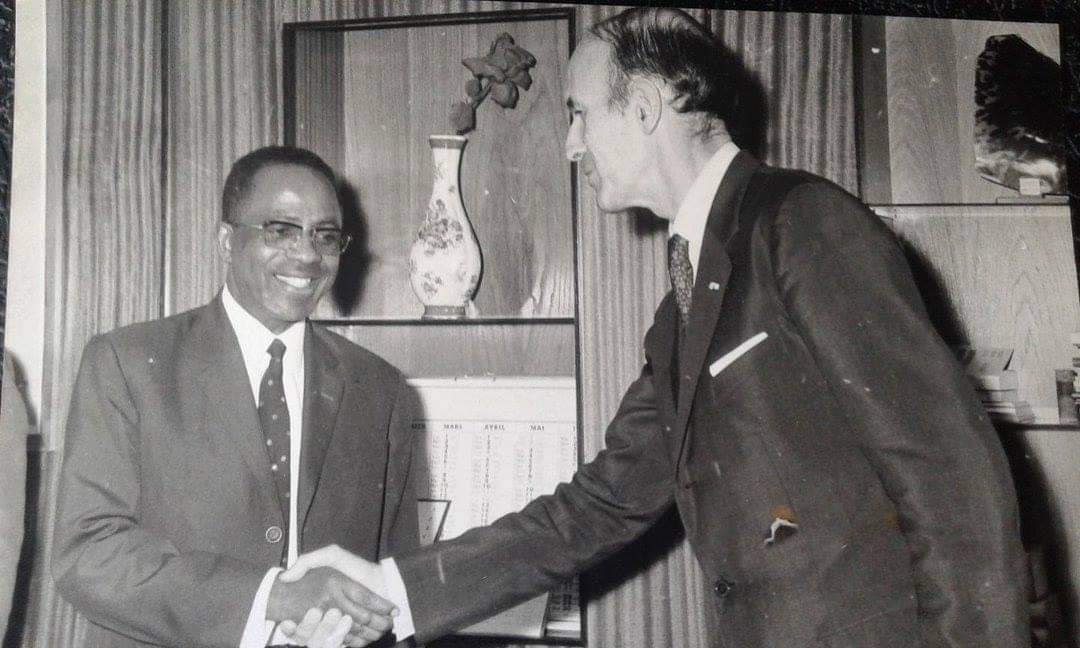
- Miadana on left

Third Vice President of Madagascar
- In office February 1971 – May 1972
- President: Philibert Tsiranana
- Preceded by: André Resampa

Personal details
- Born: 21 July 1920 Ambodimandresy
- Died: 5 February 2002 (aged 81)
- Political party: Social Democratic Party of Madagascar

Victor Miadana is a Malagasy politician during the era on Malagasy Republic, and former vice president of Madagascar.

He was born in 1920 in Ambodimandresy. He was a teacher by profession. His political career began in 1957 when he was elected to the provincial council in Diego-Suarez province, and became the chairman of the council. He also had party political leadership positions in the Social Democratic Party of Madagascar.

He was an elected member of the National Assembly of Madagascar for Vohemar Suarez from 1958 to 1964. He was an elected member of the National Assembly of Madagascar for Majunga from 1964 to 1972, and mayor of Mandritsara from 1964 to 1976.

He became Minister of Finance on 1 January 1963, and Minister of Finance and Commerce on 25 August 1965. He held the finance ministry until May 1972. He was one of the five appointed Vice Presidents of Philibert Tsiranana from 1971 to 1972. He lost his political position when President Tsiranana was effectively ousted in October 1972.

From 1979 to 1984, he was general manager of Drogueries Générales de Tananarive. In 1992 he was appointed mediator of the republic in 1992, to investigate and mediate national disputes.

He died on 5 February 2002.
