= Ranotsara Sud =

- Location in Madagascar
- Coordinates: 23.794°S 46.5955°E
- Country: Madagascar
- Region: Atsimo-Atsinanana
- District: Befotaka Sud District

Population (2018)Census
  - Total: 7,310
- Time zone: UTC3 (EAT)
- Postal code: 307

Ranotsara Atsimo is a town in Befotaka Atsimo District, in the Atsimo-Atsinanana Region in south-eastern Madagascar. Ranotsara Sud is the birthplace of Philibert Raondry.
