= Alfred Ramangasoavina =

Malagasy politician (1917–1996)

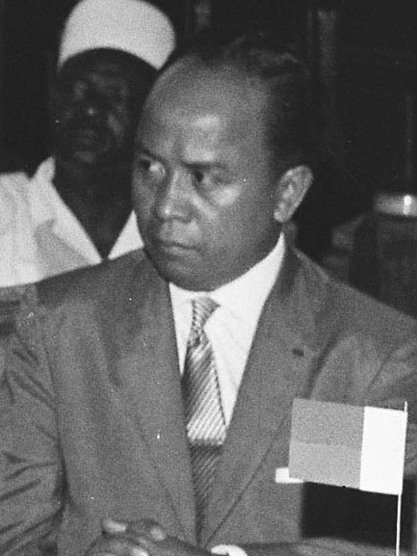
- Ramangasoavina in 1963

Fourth Vice President of Madagascar
- In office February 1971 – October 1972
- President: Philibert Tsiranana
- Preceded by: André Resampa

Personal details
- Born: 4 November 1917 Moramanga
- Died: 24 December 1996 (aged 79)
- Party: Social Democratic Party of Madagascar

Alfred Ramangasoavina was a Malagasy politician during the era on Malagasy Republic, and former vice president of Madagascar.

Ramangasoavina was born on 4 November 1917 in Moramanga. He studied in Paris and got degrees in political sciences and law. He returned to Madagascar in 1956 and was elected to Antananarivo provincial council in 1957. He was appointed as minister of finance in 1957, minister of equipment in 1958 and minister of industry and planning in 1959. He had a fallout with Philibert Tsiranana, however he did join Tsiranana's Social Democratic Party of Madagascar in 1960.

Following the independence, he was appointed as the Minister of Justice of Malagasy Republic in October 1960. He was considered to be the senior Merina in Malagasy Republic government. He was one of the five appointed Vice Presidents of Madagascar from 1971 to 1972. He lost this political position when President Tsiranana was effectively ousted in October 1972. He was president of the Madagascar Bar Association from 1985 to 1988.

In 1991, he got a position of one of the two Vice Prime Ministers in the cabinet of Guy Willy Razanamasy. He was then appointed as a special counsellor to President Albert Zafy.

He died on 24 December 1996, at the age of 79.
