= Eugène Lechat =

French-Malagasy politician (1919–2008)

Fifth Vice President of Madagascar
- In office February 1971 – October 1972
- President: Philibert Tsiranana
- Preceded by: Andre Resampa

Personal details
- Born: 21 May 1919 Mesloups, Orne
- Died: 11 May 2008 (aged 88)
- Party: Social Democratic Party of Madagascar

Eugène Bernard Lechat was a French-Malagasy politician during the era on Malagasy Republic, and former vice president of Madagascar.

Lechat was born as French citizen on 21 May 1919. in Mesloups, Orne, Normandy, France. He moved to Madagascar in 1951. He worked as an administrator. He was a director of regional schools from 1951 to 1957. He was one of the founders of the Social Democratic Party of Madagascar. He was an assembly representative from Fianarantsoa Province since 1957.

Lechat was a Senator from Madagascar in the French Senate during French Fourth Republic from 1958 to 1959. During the Malagasy Republic he took Malagasy citizenship. He served as minister of public works, posts and telecommunications, and minister of equipment and communications. He was also one of the Vice Presidents of Madagascar from 1971 to 1972, and also deputy secretary general of the Social Democratic Party.

Lechat lost his political position alongside President Tsiranana in October 1972, and returned to France with his wife. In 1989 he returned to Madagascar, and served as the mayor of Mananjary from 1995 to 1999, and then retired from politics. He died on 11 May 2008.
