= Ambarikorano =

- Location in Madagascar
- Coordinates: 15°53′S 48°58′E
- Country: Madagascar
- Region: Sofia
- District: Mandritsara
- Elevation: 356 m (1,168 ft)

Population (2001)
  - Total: 9,000
- Time zone: UTC3 (EAT)

Ambarikorano or Ambariokorano is a town and commune (Malagasy: kaominina) in Madagascar. It belongs to the district of Mandritsara, which is a part of Sofia Region. The population of the commune was estimated to be approximately 9,000 in 2001 commune census.

Primary and junior level secondary education are available in town. The majority 80% of the population of the commune are farmers, while an additional 15% receives their livelihood from raising livestock. The most important crops are peanut and rice, while other important agricultural products are banana, wheat, maize and cassava. Services provide employment for 5% of the population.

== History ==
A cattle ranch in Ambarikorano was the birthplace of Philibert Tsiranana, the first president of Madagascar.
