= 1965 Malagasy parliamentary election =

- 8 August 1965

All 107 seats in the National Assembly 54 seats needed for a majority
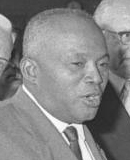

	First party	Second party
Leader	Philibert Tsiranana
Party	PSD	AKFM
Last election	76	9
Seats won	104	3
Seat change	▲28	▼6
Popular vote	2,277,055	68,794
Percentage	94.58%	2.86%
Swing	▲32.98pp	▼7.84pp

Parliamentary elections were held in Madagascar on 8 August 1965. The result was a victory for the Social Democratic Party, which won 104 of the 107 seats (reduced from 127) in the National Assembly.

== Results ==
Party	Votes	%	Seats	+/–
Social Democratic Party	2,277,055	94.58	104	+28
Congress Party for the Independence of Madagascar	68,794	2.86	3	–6
Others	61,775	2.57	0	–42
Total	2,407,624	100.00	107	–20
Valid votes	2,431,887	98.64		
Invalid/blank votes	33,649	1.36		
Total votes	2,465,536	100.00		
Registered voters/turnout	2,610,930	94.43		
Source: EISA (Note: There is a difference of 24,263 between the total number of votes for parties and the total number of valid votes.)
