= Maurice Bompard (politician) =

French diplomat and politician

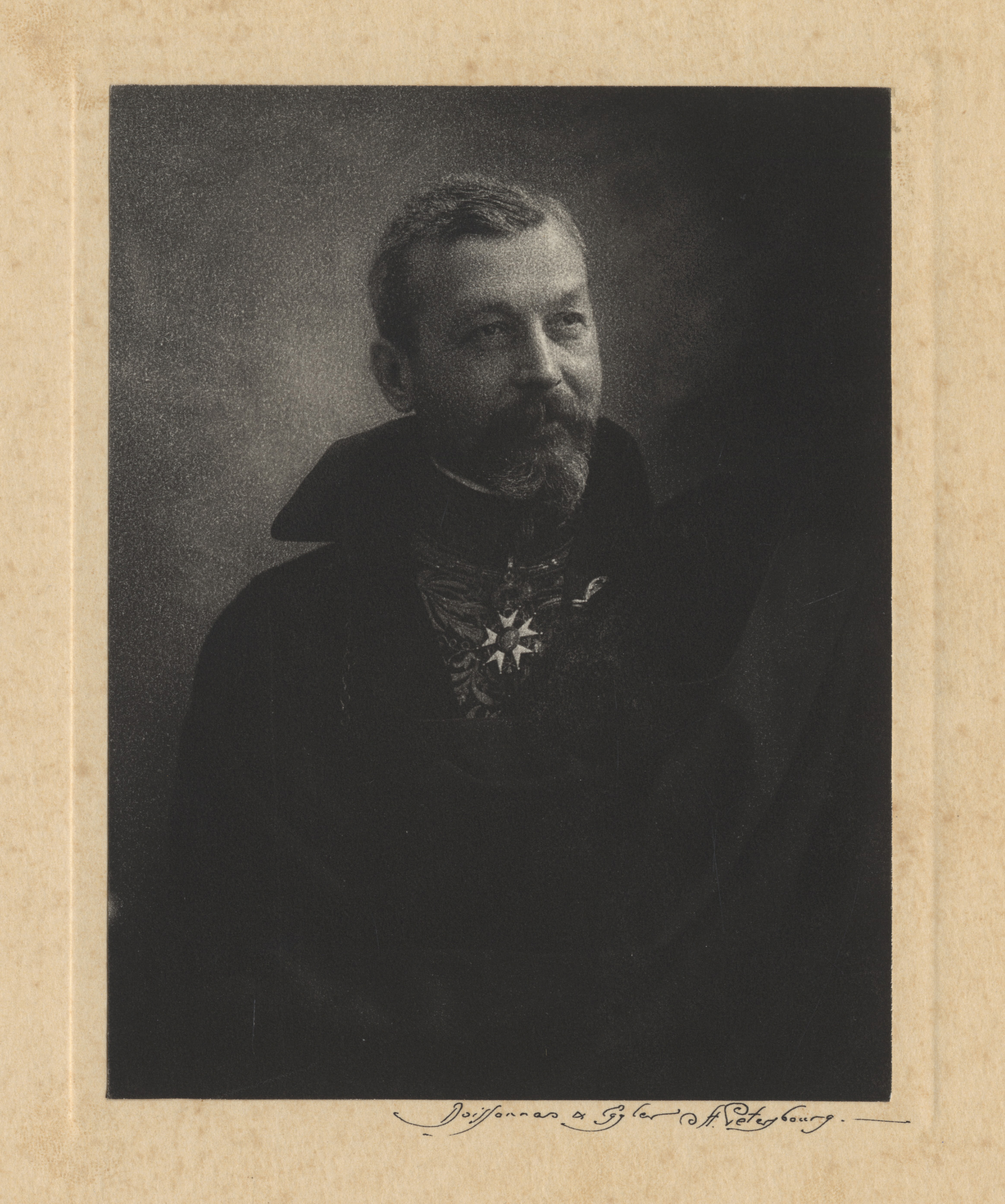
Maurice Bompard

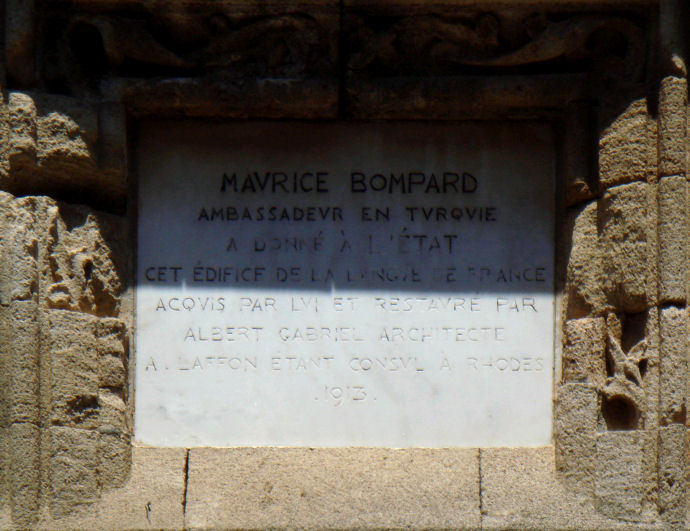
Plate mentioning Maurice Bompard, in Rhodes

Maurice Bompard (17 May 1854 – 7 April 1935) was a pre-WWI French diplomat and later a politician.

== Career ==
Bompard was Resident-General for Madagascar from 1889 to 1890. He was head of the Consular department at the Ministry of Foreign Affairs (Quai d'Orsay), when in September 1902 he was appointed French Ambassador to Russia. In 1909 he was transferred to the post of French Ambassador to the Ottoman Empire, serving as such until 1914.

After the end of the First World War, he was elected a Senator of Moselle in January 1920, stepping down in 1933, before his death two years later.

== See also ==
- French Ambassador to Russia
- French Ambassador to the Ottoman Empire
