= Philibert Raondry =

Malagasy politician (born 1912)

Vice President of Madagascar
- In office May 1959 – June 1960
- President: Philibert Tsiranana
- Succeeded by: Calvin Tsiebo

Personal details
- Born: 1912 Ranotsara Sud, Madagascar
- Party: PADESM; UDSM

Philibert Raondry was a Malagasy politician and diplomat during the era on Malagasy Republic, and former Vice President of Madagascar.

Raondry was born in Ranotsara Sud, Madagascar, in 1912. He studied to be a teacher, and worked as a civil servant. He was a member of PADESM party, and later joined UDSM.

Raondry was Vice President of the provisional government in 1958.´He was appointed as the Vice President of Madagascar for President Philibert Tsiranana from May 1959 to June 1960 just prior independence. From 1959 to at least until August 1960, he was also minister of public works, labour and social affairs.

Later Raondry worked as a diplomat. He was the consul general in Marseille from 1961 to 1963. He was ambassador to Algeria from January 1965 to 1966. Then ambassador to Federal Republic of Germany from 1970 to up until 1973. He was also ambassador to the Holy See from 1970 to 1973.

Raondry was confirmed to be alive in 1980.
