= Vice President of Madagascar =

The vice president of Madagascar was a political position in Madagascar during the era of Malagasy Republic.

Position	Name	Took office	Left office	President	Notes
Vice President	Philibert Raondry	May 1959	June 1960	Philibert Tsiranana	
Vice President	Calvin Tsiebo	June 1960	October 1970	Philibert Tsiranana	
1st Vice President	André Resampa	October 1970	February 1971	Philibert Tsiranana	
1st Vice President	Calvin Tsiebo	February 1971	October 1972	Philibert Tsiranana	
2nd Vice President	Jacques Rabemananjara	February 1971	May 1972	Philibert Tsiranana	
3rd Vice President	Victor Miadana	February 1971	May 1972	Philibert Tsiranana	
4th Vice President	Alfred Ramangasoavina	February 1971	May 1972	Philibert Tsiranana	
5th Vice President	Eugène Lechat	February 1971	May 1972	Philibert Tsiranana	
