= Calvin Tsiebo =

Malagasy politician

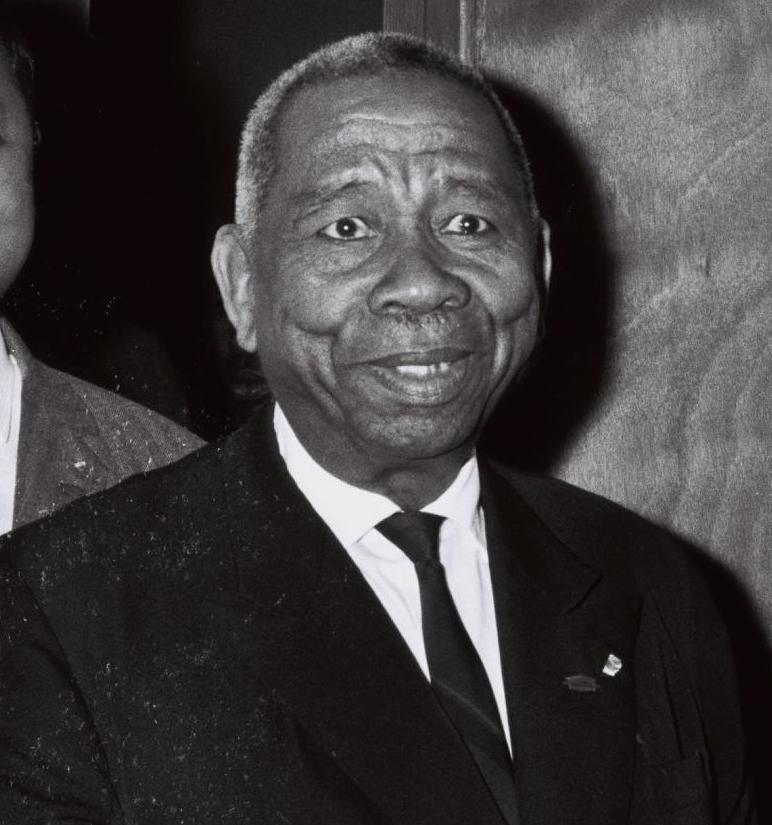
- Calvin Tsiebo in 1967

Vice President of Madagascar
- In office June 1960 – October 1970
- President: Philibert Tsiranana
- Preceded by: Philibert Raondry
- Succeeded by: Andre Resampa

First Vice President of Madagascar
- In office February 1971 – October 1972
- President: Philibert Tsiranana
- Preceded by: Andre Resampa

Personal details
- Born: 12 July 1902 Andoharano
- Died: 2008 (aged 105–106)
- Political party: Social Democratic Party of Madagascar

Calvin Tsiebo (12 July 1902 – 2008) was a Malagasy politician and civil servant who played a key role during the era on Malagasy Republic. A founding member of the Social Democratic Party, he served as Vice President of Madagascar from 1960 to 1970 under President Philibert Tsiranana.

Tsiebo was born on 12 July 1902 in Andoharano. He became a civil servant during the French colonial administration. He was elected to the provincial assembly of Toliara in 1949. Tsiebo became one of the founders of Social Democratic Party of Madagascar in 1956.

In October 1960, he was elected as the president of the new National Assembly, but left that position in November 1960 upon appointment as Vice President of Philibert Tsiranana. He was given additional portfolio as minister of labour and social legislation in 1965. Tsiebo was one of the loyal supporters of Tsiranana and was in charge of Malagasy government during Tsiranana's serious illness in 1970. Tsiebo lost his political position alongside Tsiranana in October 1972.
