= Philibert Tsiranana =

Malagasy politician, first President of Madagascar from 1959 to 1972

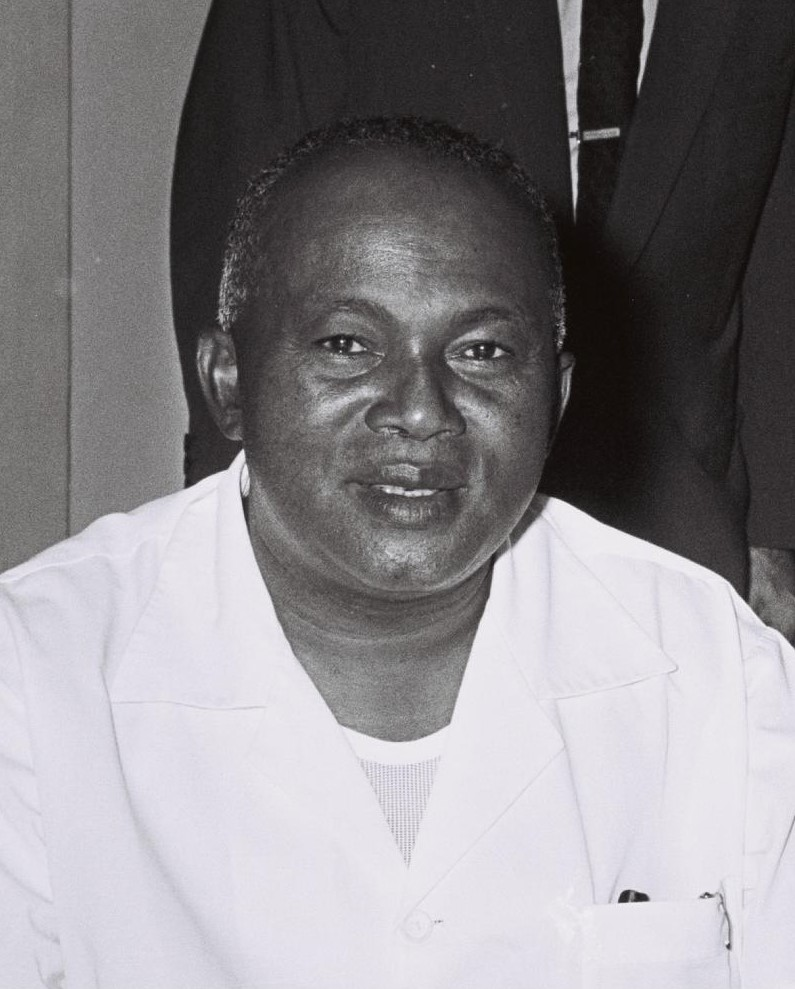
- Tsiranana in 1961

1st President of Madagascar
- In office 1 May 1959 – 11 October 1972
- Vice President: Philibert Raondry; Calvin Tsiebo; Andre Resampa; Calvin Tsiebo; Jacques Rabemananjara; Victor Miadana; Alfred Ramangasoavina; Eugène Lechat
- Preceded by: Office established
- Succeeded by: Gabriel Ramanantsoa

7th Prime Minister of Madagascar
- In office 14 October 1958 – 1 May 1959
- Preceded by: Position reestablished Rasanjy (1896–1897)
- Succeeded by: Position abolished from 1959 to 1972; Gabriel Ramanantsoa (1972–1975)

Personal details
- Born: 18 October 1912 Ambarikorano, French Madagascar
- Died: 16 April 1978 (aged 65) Antananarivo, Democratic Republic of Madagascar
- Party: Social Democratic Party
- Spouse: Justine Tsiranana (m. 1933)
- Profession: Professor of French and Mathematics

Philibert Tsiranana (18 October 1912 – 16 April 1978) was a Malagasy politician who served as the seventh prime minister of Madagascar from 1958 to 1959, and subsequently as the country's first president from 1959 to 1972.

During the twelve years of his administration, the Republic of Madagascar experienced institutional stability that stood in contrast to the political turmoil many mainland African countries experienced in this period. This stability contributed to Tsiranana's popularity and his reputation as a remarkable statesman. Madagascar experienced moderate economic growth under his social democratic policies and came to be known as "the Happy Island." However, the electoral process was fraught with issues and his term ultimately terminated in a series of farmer and student protests that brought about the end of the First Republic and the establishment of the officially socialist Second Republic.

The "benevolent schoolmaster" public image that Tsiranana cultivated went alongside a firmness of convictions and actions that some believe tended toward authoritarianism. Nonetheless, he remains an esteemed Malagasy political figure remembered throughout the country as its "Father of Independence".

== Early life (1910–1955) ==
=== From cattle herder to teacher ===
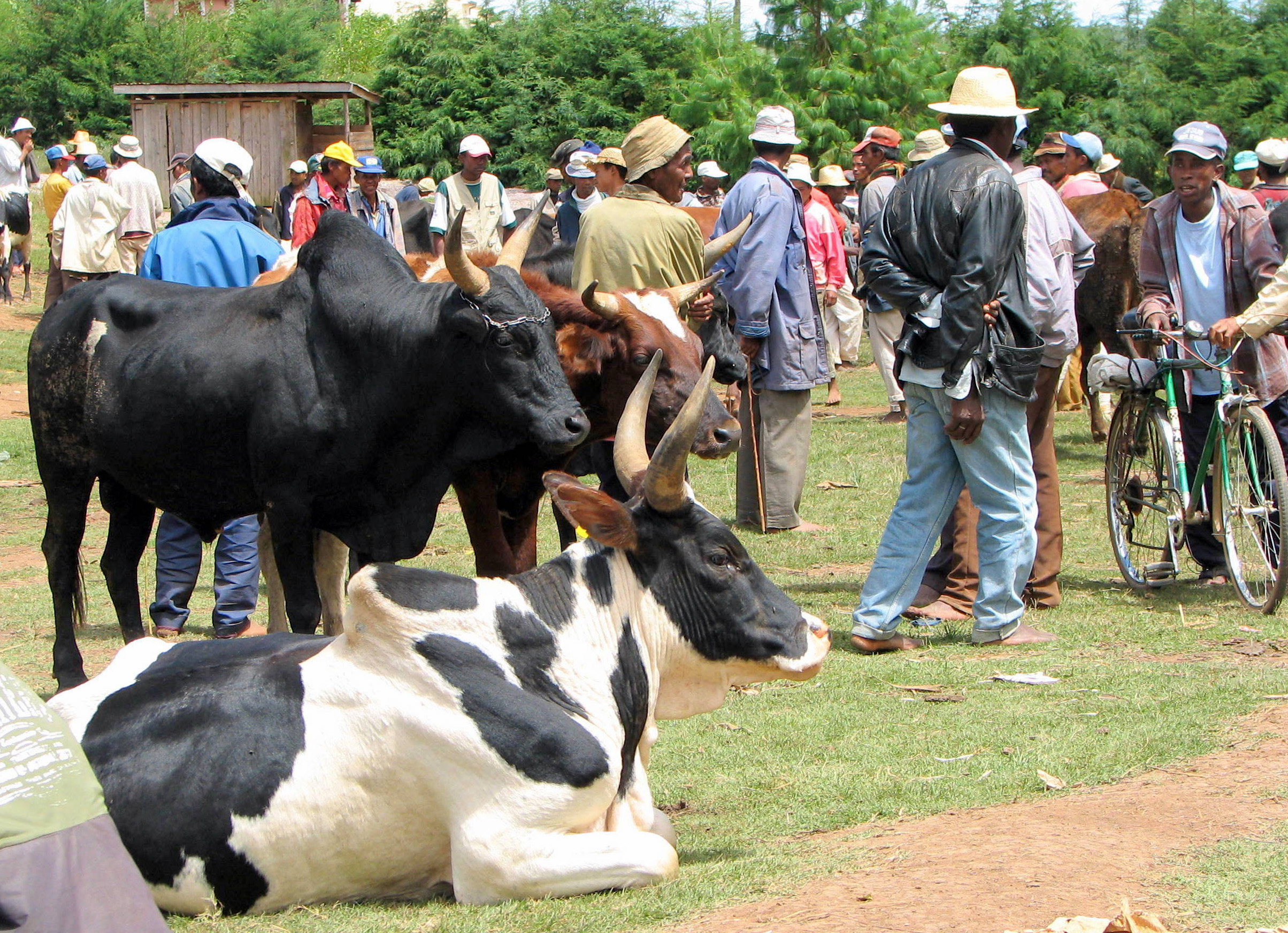
An example of cattle ranchers in Madagascar.

According to his official biography, Tsiranana was born on 18 October 1912 in Ambarikorano, Sofia Region, in northeastern Madagascar. Born to Madiomanana and Fisadoha Tsiranana, Catholic cattle ranchers from the Tsimihety ethnic group, Philibert was destined to become a cattle rancher himself. However, following the death of his father in 1923, Tsiranana's brother, Zamanisambo, suggested that he attend a primary school in Anjiamangirana.

A brilliant student, Tsiranana was admitted into the Analalava regional school in 1926, where he graduated with a brevet des collèges. In 1930, he enrolled in the Le Myre de Vilers normal school in Tananarive, named after former resident-general of Madagascar Charles Le Myre de Vilers, where he entered the "Section Normale" program, preparing him for a career teaching in primary schools. After completing his studies, he started a teaching career in his hometown. In 1942, he began receiving instruction in Tananarive for middle school teaching and in 1945, he succeeded in the teacher assistant competitive examinations, allowing him to serve as a professor in a regional school. In 1946, he obtained a scholarship to the École normale d'instituteurs in Montpellier, France, where he worked as a teacher assistant. He left Madagascar on 6 November.

=== From communism to PADESM ===
In 1943, Philibert Tsiranana joined the professional teachers' union and in 1944 entered the General Confederation of Labor (CGT). With the end of World War II and the creation of the French Union by the Fourth Republic, the colonial society of Madagascar experienced a liberalization. The colonized peoples now had the right to be politically organized. Tsiranana joined the Group of Student Communists (GEC) of Madagascar in January 1946, on the advice of his mentor Paul Ralaivoavy. He assumed the role of treasurer. The GEC enabled him to meet future leaders of the PADESM (Party of the Disinherited of Madagascar), which he became a founding member of in June 1946.

The PADESM was a political organization composed mainly of Mainty and Tanindrana from the coastal region. The PADESM came about as a result of the holding of the French constituent elections of 1945 and 1946. For the first time, the people of Madagascar were allowed to participate in French elections, with electing settlers and indigenous people to the French National Assembly. To ensure that they won one of the two seats allotted to native people of Madagascar, the inhabitants of the coastal region made an agreement with the Mouvement démocratique de la rénovation malgache (MDRM) which was controlled by the Merina of the uplands. (Note: In the precolonial period, the Malagasy aristocracy had been almost entirely composed of the Merina.) The coastal people agreed to seek the election of Paul Ralaivoavy in the west, while leaving the east to the Merina candidate, Joseph Ravoahangy. This agreement was not honoured and the Merina Joseph Raseta won the second seat in October 1945 and June 1946. Concerned about the possible return of "Merina control," the coastal people founded PADESM in order to counter the nationalist goals of the MDRM and oppose Malagasy independence - a position justified by Tsiranana in 1968:

If [the achievement independence] had occurred in 1946, there would have been a civil war at once because the coastal people would not have accepted it. Given the intellectual level of the period, they would have remained petty village chiefs, subordinated, subjugated, not to say slaves, since the gap between the people of the coast and the people of the uplands was enormous.

— Philibert Tsiranana

In July 1946, Tsiranana refused the post of secretary general of PADESM on account of his impending departure for the École normale de Montpellier. Tsiranana had become known for his contributions to PADESM's journal Voromahery, authored under the pseudonym "Tsimihety" (derived from his birthplace).

=== Period in France ===
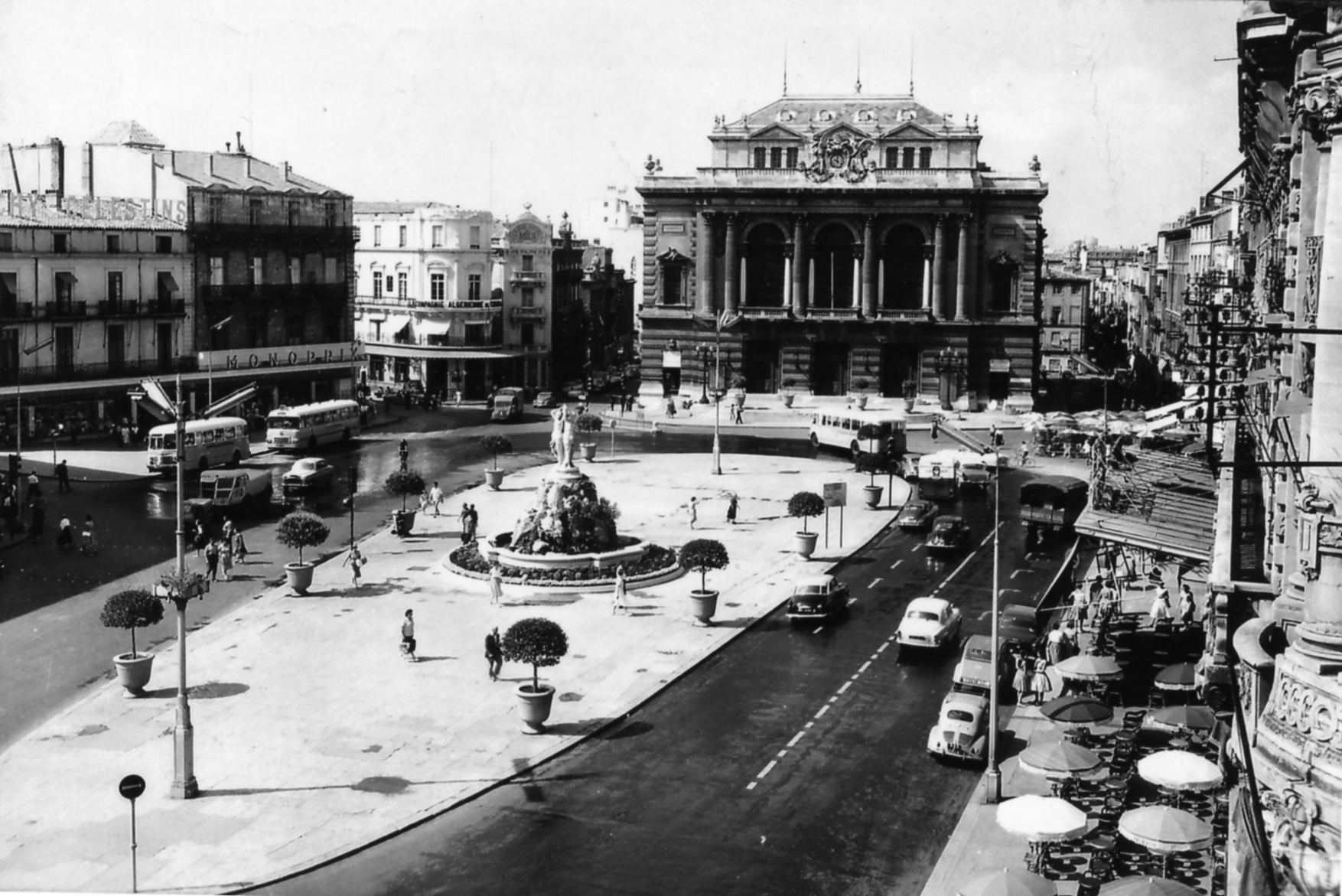
The place de la Comédie, Montpellier.

As a result of his journey to France, Tsiranana escaped the Malagasy Uprising of 1947 and its bloody suppression. Moved by the events, Tsiranana participated in an anti-colonial protest in Montpellier on 21 February 1949, although not a supporter of independence.

During his time in France, Tsiranana became conscious of the bias towards the Malagasy elite in education. He found that only 17 of the 198 Malagasy students in France were coastal people. In his view, there could never be a free union between all Malagasy while a cultural gap remained between the coastal people and the people of the highlands. To remedy this gap, he established two organisations in Madagascar: the Association of Coastal Malagasy Students (AEMC) in August 1949, and then the Cultural Association of Coastal Malagasy Intellectuals (ACIMCO) in September 1951. These organisations were resented by the Merina and were held against him.

On his return to Madagascar in 1950, Tsiranana was appointed professor of technical education at the École industrielle in Tananarive in the highlands. There he taught French and mathematics. But he was uncomfortable at this school and transferred to the École « Le Myre de Vilers », where his abilities were more appreciated.

=== Progressivist ambitions ===
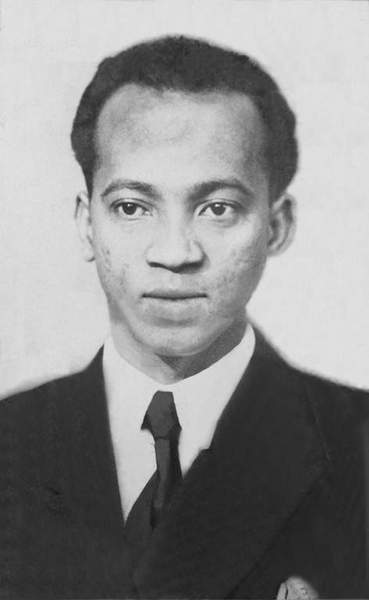
Senator Norbert Zafimahova, representative of Madagascar in the Council of the Republic from 1948 to 1959

Renewing his activities with PADESM, Tsiranana campaigned to reform the left wing of the party. He considered the directorial committee very disloyal to the administration. In article published on 24 April 1951 in Varomahery, entitled "Mba Hiraisantsika" (To unite us), he called for reconciliation between the coastal people and the Merina in advance of the forthcoming legislative elections. In October he launched an appeal in the bimonthly Ny Antsika ("Our thing") which he had founded, an appeal to the Malagasy elites to "form a single tribe". This appeal to unity concealed a political plan: Tsiranana aspired to take part in the 1951 legislative elections as a candidate for the west coast. The tactic failed because far from creating agreement, it led to suspicion among the coastal political class that he was a communist, and he was forced to renounce his candidature in favour of the "moderate" Raveloson-Mahasampo.

On 30 March 1952, Tsiranana was elected provincial counsellor for the 3rd district of Majunga on the "Social Progress" list. He combined this role with that of Counsellor on the Representative Assembly of Madagascar. Seeking a position in the French government, he offered himself as a candidate in the elections organised by the Territorial Assembly of Madagascar in May 1952 for the five senators of the Council of the Republic. Since two of these seats were reserved for French citizens, (Note: The participation of the French colonies in the French parliament was introduced in 1945. In order to ensure the representation of natives and colonists, elections were conducted by a "double electoral college." In this system, each of the colleges woted for its own candidates. The native college was the college of the "Citizens of the French Union", also called the "College of the natives" or the "second college". Initially, citizenship of the French Union was granted to natives on the basis of their status as chiefs, veterans, officials, etc. Citizens of France were also granted citizenship of the French Union and could vote either in the college reserved for them or in the second college.) Tsiranana was only allowed to stand for one of the three seats reserved for native people. He was beaten by Pierre Ramampy, Norbert Zafimahova, and Ralijaona Laingo. Effected by this defeat, Tsiranana accused the administration of "racial discrimination." Along with other native counsellors, he proposed the establishment of a single electoral college to French Prime Minister Pierre Mendès France.

In the same year, Tsiranana joined the new Malagasy Action, a "third party between radical nationalists and supporters of the status quo," which sought to establish social harmony through equality and justice. Tsiranana hoped to establish a national profile for himself and transcend the coastal and regional character of PADESM, especially since he no longer supported Madagascar simply being a free state of the French Union, but sought full independence from France.

== Rise to power (1956–1958) ==
=== Deputy in the French National Assembly ===
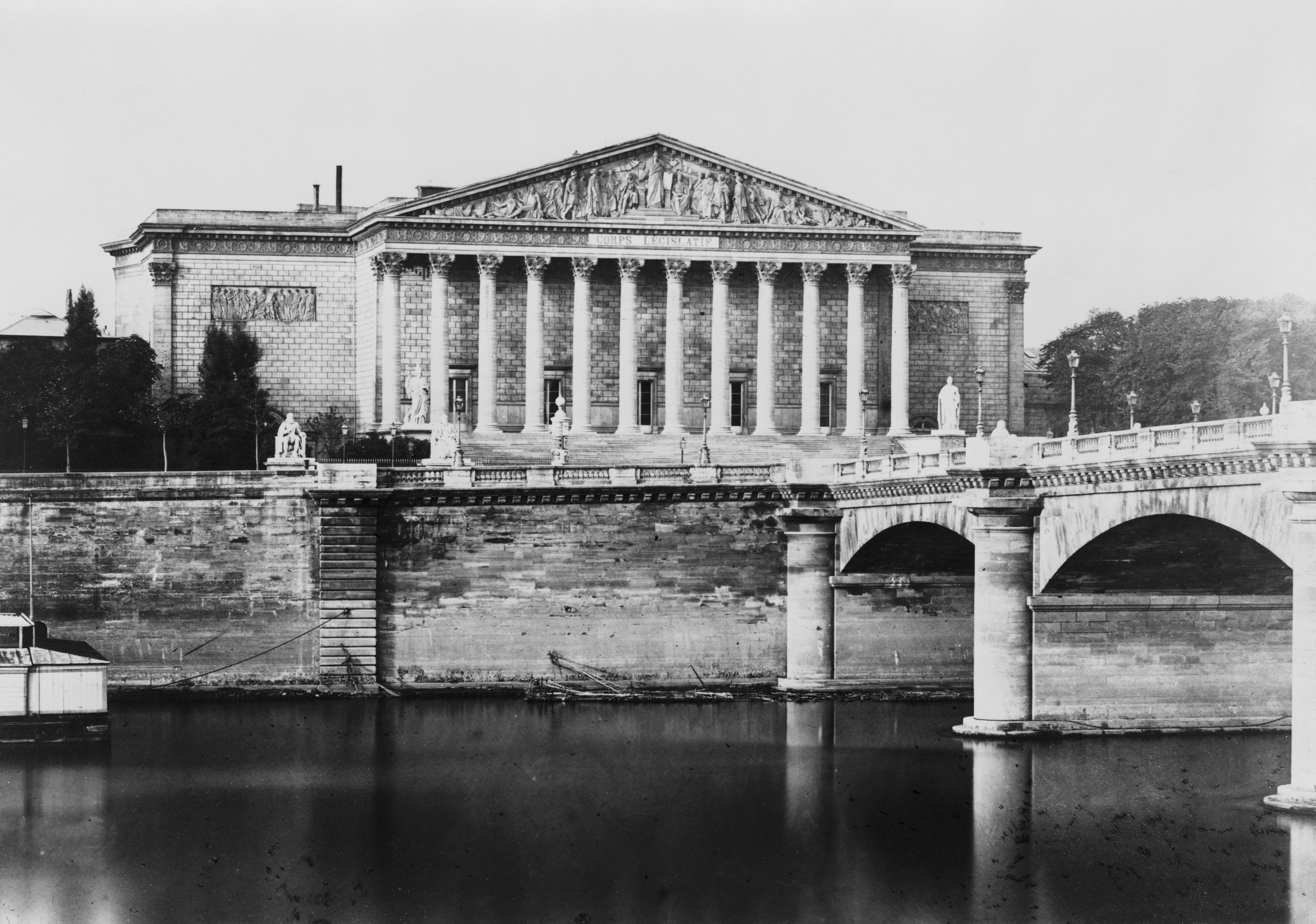
The Palais Bourbon, seat of the French National Assembly

In 1955, while visiting France on administrative live, Tsiranana joined the French Section of the Workers' International (SFIO), in advance of the January 1956 elections for seats in the French National Assembly. During his electoral campaign, Tsiranana was able to count on the support of the Malagasy National Front (FNM), led by Merina who had left Malagasy Action, and especially on the support of the High Commissioner André Soucadaux, who saw Tsiranana as the most reasonable of the nationalists seeking election. Thanks to this support and the following which he had built up over the previous five years, Tsiranana was elected as deputy for the western region, with 253,094 of the 330,915 votes.

In the Palais Bourbon, Tsiranana joined the socialist group. He rapidly gained a reputation as a frank talker; in March 1956, he affirmed the dissatisfaction of the Malagasy with the French Union which he characterised as simply a continuation of savage colonialism: "All this is just a facade - the foundation remains the same." On arrival, he demanded the repeal of the annexation law of August 1896. Finally, in July 1956, he called for reconciliation, demanding the release of all prisoners from the 1947 insurrection. By combining calls for friendship with France, political independence and national unity, Tsiranana acquired a national profile.

His position as deputy also gave him the opportunity to demonstrate his local political interests. Through his stress on equality, he obtained a majority in the Malagasy Territorial Assembly for his personal bastion in the north and northwest. In addition, he worked energetically in favour of decentralisation - ostensibly in order to improve economic and social services. As a result, he received harsh criticism from some members of the French Communist Party (PCF) who were allied to ardent nationalists in Tananarive and accused him of seeking to "Balkanise" Madagascar. Tsiranana developed a firm anti-communist attitude as a result. This support for private property led him to submit his only bill of law on 20 February 1957, proposing "increased penalties for cattle thieves," which the French penal code did not take into account.

=== Creation of PSD and the Loi Cadre Defferre ===
Tsiranana increasingly made himself the leader of the coastal people. On 28 December 1956, he founded the Social Democratic Party (PSD) at Majunga with people from the left wing of PADESM, including André Resampa. The new party was affiliated to the SFIO. The PSD was more or less the heir of PADESM, but rapidly exceeded PADESM's limits, since it simultaneously appealed to rural nobles on the coast, officials, and anti-communists in favour of independence. From the beginning, his party benefitted from the support of the colonial administration, which was in the process of transferring executive power in accordance with the Loi Cadre Defferre.

The entry into force of the Loi Cadre was expected to take place after the 1957 territorial elections. On 31 March, Tsiranana was re-elected as a provincial counsellor on the "Union and Social Progress" list with 79,991 votes out of 82,121. Since he was head of the list, he was named president of the Majunga Provincial Assembly on 10 April 1957. On 27 March, this assembly selected an executive council. Tsiranana's PSD had only nine seats in the representative assembly. A coalition government was formed with Tsiranana at its head as vice-president and the High Commissioner André Soucadaux as president de jure. Tsiranana succeeded in getting his closest supporter, André Resampa, appointed as minister of education.

Once in power, Tsiranana slowly consolidated his authority. On 12 June 1957, a second section of PSD was founded in Toliara province. Sixteen counsellors of the provincial assembly joined it and the PSD thus took control of Toliara. Like most African politicians in power in the French Union, Tsiranana publicly complained about the limitations on his power as vice-president of the council. In April 1958, during the 3rd PSD party congress, Tsiranana attacked the Loi Cadre and the bicephalous character which it imposed on the council and the fact that the presidency of the Malagasy government was held by the high commissioner. The assumption of power by Charles de Gaulle in June 1958 changed the situation. By a national government ordinance, the hierarchy of the colonial territories was modified in favour of local politicians. Thus, on 22 August 1958, Tsiranana officially became the President of the Executive Council of Madagascar.

== Malagasy Republic within the French Community (1958–1960) ==
=== Promotion of the Franco-African Community ===
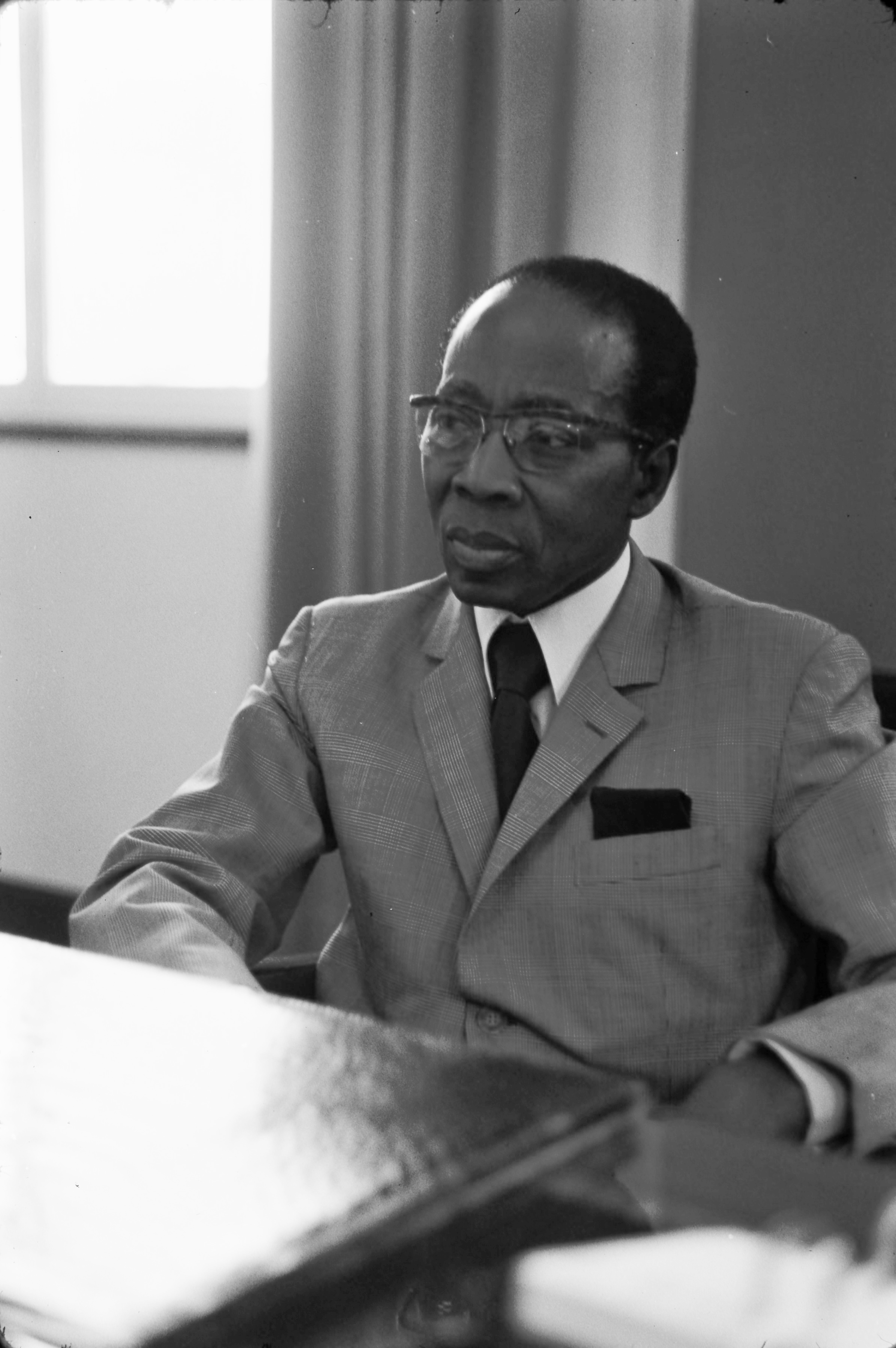
Léopold Sédar Senghor, deputy for Senegal (1946-1959)

Despite this activity, Tsiranana was more a supporter of strong autonomy rather than independence. He advocated a very moderate nationalism:

We think that a well-prepared independence would have mixed value, because political independence too early would lead to a more atrocious form of dependence: economic dependence. We maintain trust in France and count on French talent to discover, when the time comes, a system comparable to that of the British Commonwealth. For, we Malagasy will never want to cut ourselves off from France. We are part of French culture and we want to remain French.

— Tsiranana

On his return to power in 1958, Charles de Gaulle decided to accelerate the process of decolonisation. The French Union was to be replaced by a new organisation. De Gaulle appointed a consultative committee, including many African and Malagasy politicians, on 23 July 1958. Its discussion concentrated essentially on the nature of the links between France and her former colonies. The Ivoirien Félix Houphouët-Boigny proposed the establishment of a Franco-African "Federation," while Léopold Sédar Senghor of Senegal pushed for a "confederation." In the end the concept of "community", suggested to Tsiranana by Raymond Janot, one of the editors of the Constitution of the Fifth Republic, which was chosen.

Naturally, Tsiranana actively campaigned, along with the Union of Social Democrats of Madagascar (UDSM) led by senator Norbert Zafimahova, for the "yes" vote in the referendum on whether Madagascar should join the French Community, which was held on 28 September 1958. The "no" campaign was led by the Union of Malagasy Peoples (UPM). The "yes" vote won with 1,361,801 votes, compared to 391,166 votes for "no". On the basis of this vote, Tsiranana secured the repeal of the annexation law of 1896. On 14 October 1958, during a meeting of the provincial counsellors, Tsiranana proclaimed the autonomous Malagasy Republic, of which he became the provisional prime minister. The next day, the annexation law of 1896 was repealed.

=== Political manoeuvres against the opposition ===
On 16 October 1958, the congress elected a national assembly of 90 members for drafting a constitution, by means of a majority general ballot for each province. This method of election ensured that PSD and UDSM would not face any opposition in the assembly from the parties which campaigned for a "no" vote in the referendum. Norbert Zafimahova was chosen as president of the assembly.

In reaction to the creation of this assembly, the UPM, FNM and the Association of Peasants' Friends merged to form a single party, the Congress Party for the Independence of Madagascar (AKFM), led by the priest Richard Andriamanjato, on 19 October. This party was Marxist and became the principal opposition to the government.

Tsiranana rapidly instituted state infrastructure in the provinces which enabled him to contain AKFM. In particular, he appointed secretaries of state in all the provinces. Then, on 27 January, he dissolved the municipal council of Diego Suarez, which was controlled by the Marxists. Finally, on 27 February 1959, he passed a law introducing the "offense of contempt for national and communal institutions" and used this to sanction certain publications.

=== Election as President of the Malagasy Republic ===
On 29 April 1959, the constitutional assembly accepted the constitution proposed by the government. It was largely modelled on the Constitution of France, but with some unique characteristics. The Head of State was the Head of Government and held all executive power; the vice-president had only a very minor role. The legislature was to be bicameral, unusually for Francophone African countries of that time. The provinces, with their own provincial councils, had a degree of autonomy. On the whole the government structure was that of a moderate presidential system, rather than a parliamentary one.

On 1 May, the parliament elected a college consisting of provincial counsellors and an equal number of delegates from communities, which was to select the first President of the Republic. Four candidates were nominated: Philibert Tsiranana, Basile Razafindrakoto, Prosper Rajoelson and Maurice Curmer. In the end, Tsiranana was unanimously elected as the first president of the Malagasy Republic with 113 votes (and one abstention).

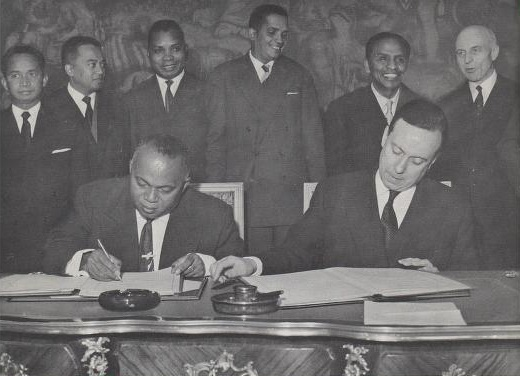
Philibert Tsiranana and Michel Debré signing agreements on the independence of the Malagasy Republic

On 24 July 1959, Charles de Gaulle appointed four responsible African politicians, of whom Tsiranana was one, to the position of "Minister-Counsellor" of the French government for the affairs of the French Community. Tsiranana used his new powers to call for national sovereignty for Madagascar; de Gaulle accepted this. In February 1960, a Malagasy delegation led by André Resampa was sent to Paris to negotiate the transfer of power. Tsiranana insisted that all Malagasy organisations should be represented in this delegation, except for AKFM (which he deplored). On 2 April 1960, the Franco-Malagasy accords were signed by Prime Minister Michel Debré and President Tsiranana at the Hôtel Matignon. On 14 June, the Malagasy parliament unanimously accepted the accords. On 26 June, Madagascar became independent.

== The "state of grace" (1960–1967) ==
Tsiranana sought to establish national unity through a policy of stability and moderation.

In order to legitimise his image as the "father of independence", on 20 July 1960, Tsiranana recalled to the island the three old deputies, "exiled" to France after the 1947 rebellion: Joseph Ravoahangy, Joseph Raseta and Jacques Rabemananjara. The popular and political impact was significant. The President invited these "Heroes of 1947" to enter his second government on 10 October 1960; Joseph Ravoahangy became Minister of Health and Jacques Rabemananjara became Minister of the Economy. Joseph Raseta, by contrast, refused the offer and joined AFKM instead.

Tsiranana frequently affirmed his membership of the western bloc:

We are resolutely part of the Western World, because that is the Free world and because our deepest deepest aspiration is the liberty of man and the liberty of nations

— Philibert Tsiranana

Tsiranana's administration thus aspired to respect human rights and the press was relatively free - as was the justice system. The Constitution of 1959 guaranteed political pluralism. The extreme left was allowed the right to political organisation. A fairly radical opposition existed in the form of the National Movement for the Independence of Madagascar (MONIMA), led by nationalist Monja Jaona who campaigned vigorously on behalf of the very poor Malagasy of the south, while AKFM extolled "scientific socialism" and close friendship with the USSR. Tsiranana presented himself as the protector of these parties and refused to join the "fashion" for single party states:

I am too democratic for this: the single party state always leads to dictatorship. We, PSD, as the name of our party indicates, we are social democrats and refuse this kind of party system, in whole or in part. We could easily institute it in our country, but we prefer that an opposition exist.

— Philibert Tsiranana

Many institutions also existed as potential centres of opposition on the island. The Protestant and Catholic churches had great influence on the population. The various central unions were politically active in the urban centres. Associations, particularly of students and women, expressed themselves very freely.

Nevertheless, Tsiranana's "democracy" had its limits. Outside the main centres, elections were rarely held in a fair and free manner.

=== Neutralisation of opposition fiefs ===
In October 1959, at the municipal elections, AKFM won control of only the capital Tananarive (under Richard Andriamanjato) and Diego Suarez (under Francis Sautron). MONIMA won the mayoralty of Toliara (with Monja Jaona) and the mayoralty of Antsirabe (with Emile Rasakaiza).

By skilful political manoeuvres, Tsiranana's government took control of these mayoralties, one by one. By decree n°60.085 of 24 August 1960 it was established that "the administration of the city of Tananarive is henceforth entrusted to an official chosen by the Minister of the Interior and entitled General Delegate." This official took on practically all the prerogatives of mayor Andriamanjato.

Then, on 1 March 1961, Tsiranana "resigned" Monja Joana from his position as mayor of Toliara. A law of 15 July 1963, which stipulated that "the functions of the mayor and the 1st adjunct shall not be exercised by French citizens," prevented Francis Sautron from standing for re-election as mayor of Diego Suarez in the municipal elections of December 1964.

In those municipal elections, the PSD won 14 of the 36 seats on the Antsirabe municipal council; AKFM won 14 and MONIMA 8. A coalition of the two parties allowed the local leader of AKFM, Blaise Rakotomavo, to become mayor. A few months later, André Resampa, Minister of the Interior, declared the town ungovernable and dissolved the municipal council. New elections were held in 1965, which the PSD won.

=== Toleration of parliamentary opposition ===
On 4 September 1960, the Malagasy held a parliamentary election. The government chose a majority general ticket ballot system, in order to enable PSD's success in all regions (especially Majunga and Toliara). However, in the district of Tananarive city, where there was solid support for AKFM, the vote was proportional. Thus, in the capital, the PSD won two seats (with 27,911 votes) under the leadership of Joseph Ravoahangy, while AKFM, led by Joseph Raseta, won three seats with 36,271. At the end of the election, the PSD held 75 seats in the Assembly, its allies held 29, and AKFM only had 3. The "3rd Force," an alliance of thirteen local parties, received some 30% of the national vote (468,000 votes), but did not obtain a single seat.

In October 1961, the "Antsirabe meeting" took place. There, Tsiranana pledged to reduce the number of political parties on the island, which then numbered 33. The PSD then absorbed its allies and was henceforth represented in the Assembly by 104 deputies. The Malagasy political scene was split between two very unequal factions: on the one side, the PSD, which was almost a one party state; on the other, AKFM, the sole opposition party tolerated by Tsiranana in parliament. This opposition was entrenched at the legislative elections of 8 August 1965. The PSD retained 104 deputies, with 94% of the national vote (2,304,000 votes), while the AKFM picked off 3 seats with 3.4% of the vote (145,000 votes). According to Tsiranana, the weakness of the opposition was due to the fact that its members "talk a lot but never act," unlike those of the PSD, who were he claimed supported by the majority of Malagasy because they were organised, disciplined, and in permanent contact with the working class.

=== Presidential election (1965) ===
On 16 June 1962, an institutional law established the rules for the election of the president of the Republic by universal direct suffrage. In February 1965, Tsiranana decided to end his seven-year term a year early and called a presidential election for 30 March 1965. Joseph Raseta, who had quit AKFM in 1963 in order to found his own party, the National Malagasy Union (FIPIMA), stood as a presidential candidate. An independent, Alfred Razafiarisoa, also stood. The leader of MONIMA, Monja Jaona, expressed a momentary desire to run, but AKFM made much of the economy of running only one opposition candidate against Tsiranana. It then discretely supported Tsiranana.

Tsiranana's campaign ranged across the whole island, while those of his opponents were limited to local contexts by lack of money. On 30 March 1965, 2,521,216 votes were cast (the total number of people enrolled to vote was 2,583,051). Tsiranana was re-elected as president with 2,451,441 votes, 97% of the total. Joseph Raseta received 54,814 votes and Alfred Razafiarisoa got 812.

On 15 August 1965, in the legislative elections, the PSD obtained 2,475,469 votes out of 2,605,371 votes cast, in the seven districts of the country, some 95% of the vote. The opposition achieved 143,090 votes, principally in Tananarive, Diego Suarez, Tamatave, Fianarantsoa and Toliara.

=== "Malagasy Socialism" ===
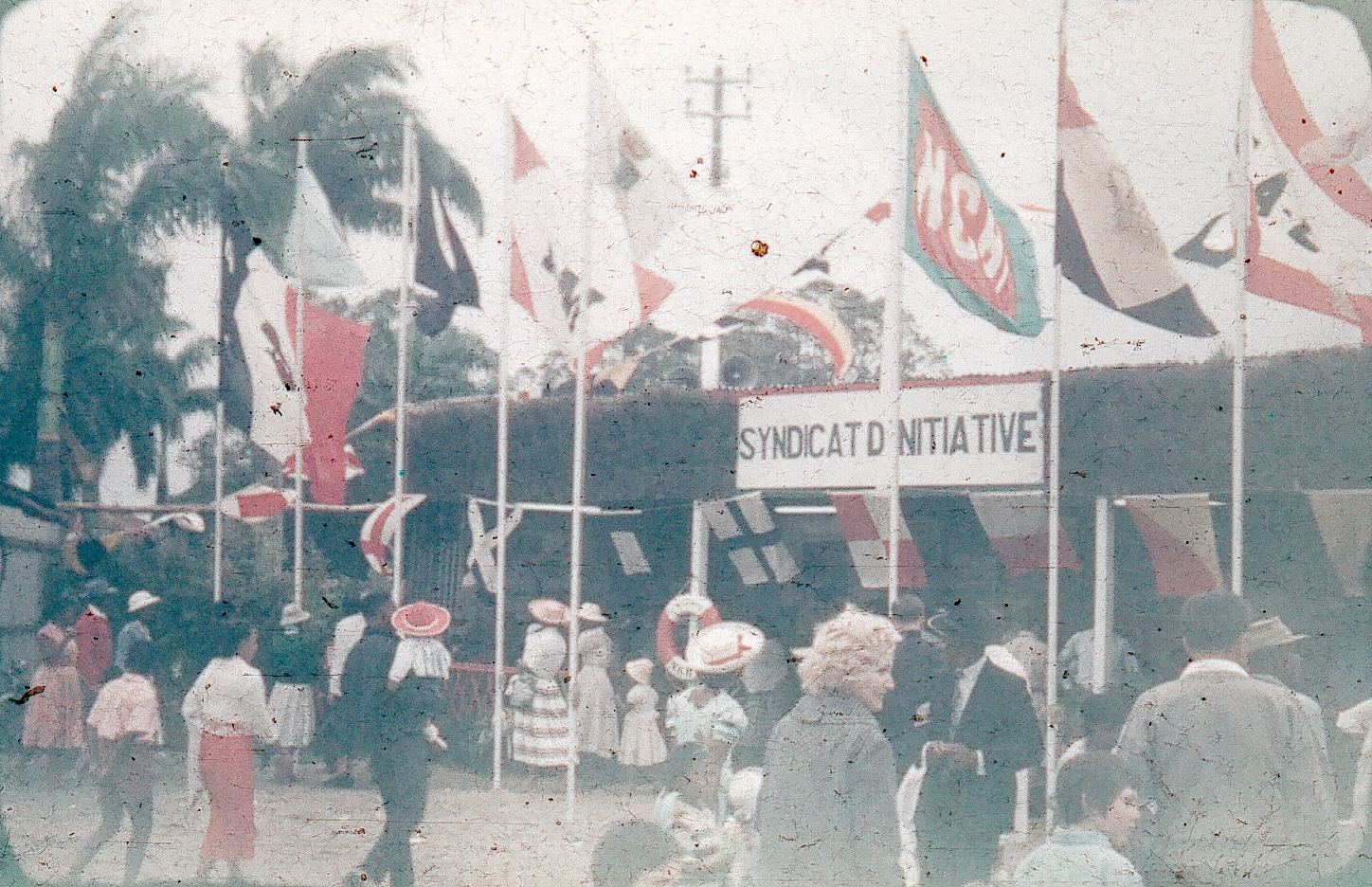
Union of initiative in Madagascar in 1960.

With independence and the consolidation of the new institutions, the government dedicated itself to the realisation of socialism. The "Malagasy Socialism" which President Tsiranana concocted was intended to resolve the problems of development by providing economic and social solutions adapted to the country; he considered it pragmatic and humanitarian.

In order to analyse the country's economic situation, he held the "Malagasy Development Days" in Tananarive on the 25th and 27 April 1962. Through these national audits, it became clear that Madagascar's communication network was entirely insufficient and that there were problems surrounding access to water and electricity. With 5.5 million inhabitants in 1960, 89% of whom lived in the countryside, the country was underpopulated, but it was potentially rich in agricultural resources. Like most of the Third World, it was experiencing a demographic explosion which closely followed the 3.7% annual average increase in agricultural production.

The Minister of economy, Jacques Rabemananjara, was therefore entrusted with three goals: the diversification of the Malagasy economy in order to make it less dependent on imports, which exceeded US$20 million in 1969; reduce the deficit of the trade balance (which was US$6 million), in order to consolidate Madagascar's independence; and increase the population's purchasing power and quality of life (the GNP per capita was less than $US 101 per year in 1960).

The economic policy instituted by Tsiranana's administration incorporated a neo-liberal ethos, combining encouragement of (national and foreign) private initiative and state intervention. In 1964, a five year plan was adopted, setting out the major government investment plans. These focused on the development of agriculture and support for farmers. For the realisation of this plan, it was envisaged that the private sector would contribute 55 billion Malagasy francs. To encourage this investment, the government set out to create a regime favourable to lenders using four institutions: the Institut d'Émission Malgache, the state treasury, the Malagasy National Bank, and above all the National Investment Society, which participated in some of the larger Malagasy and foreign commercial and industrial enterprises. To ensure the confidence of foreign capitalists, Tsiranana condemned the principle of nationalisation:

I am a liberal socialist. Consequently, the state should play its part in making the private sector free. We, we need to fill the gaps, because we do not want to create a lazy nationalisation, but on the contrary a dynamic one, which is to say that we must not despoil others and that the state should only intervene where the private sector is deficient.

— Philibert Tsiranana

This did not prevent the government from instituting a 50% tax on commercial profits not reinvested in Madagascar.

==== Cooperatives and state intervention ====
If Tsiranana was entirely hostile to the idea of socialising the means of production, he was nevertheless a socialist. His government encouraged the development of cooperatives and other means of voluntary participation. The Israeli kibbutz was investigated as the key to agricultural development. In 1962, a General Commissariat for Cooperation was created, charged with instituting cooperatives in production and commercial activity. In 1970, the cooperative sector held a monopoly on the harvesting of vanilla. It completely controlled the harvesting, processing, and export of bananas. It played a major role in the cultivation of coffee, cloves and rice. In addition, large irrigation schemes were carried out by mixed economy societies, like SOMALAC (Society for the Management of Lake Alaotra) which supported more than 5,000 rice farmers.

The main obstacle to development lay largely in the development of land. In order to remedy this, the state entrusted small scale work "at ground level" to the fokon'olona (the lowest level Malagasy administrative division equivalent to a French commune). The fokon'olona were entitled to create rural infrastructure and small dams, within the framework of the regional development plan. In these works, they were assisted by the gendarmerie, which was actively involved in national reforestation schemes, and by the civic service. Instituted in 1960 to combat idleness, the civic service enabled Malagasy youth to acquire a general education and professional training.

==== Education as a motor for development ====
In the area of education, an effort to increase the literacy of the rural population was undertaken, with the civic service's young conscripts playing a notable role. Primary education was available in most cities and villages. The expenditure on education exceeded 8 billion Malagasy francs in 1960 and was more than 20 billion by 1970 - a rise from 5.8% to 9.0% of GDP. This enabled the primary school workforce to be doubled from 450,000 to nearly a million, the secondary school workforce to be quadrupled from 26,000 to 108,000 and the higher education workforce to be sextupled from 1,100 to 7,000. Lycées were opened in all provinces, as well as the transformation of the Centre of Higher Studies of Tananarive into the University of Madagascar in October 1961. As a result of this increased education, Tsiranana planned to establish a number of Malagasy technical and administrative groups.

==== Economic results (1960–1972) ====
In the end, of the 55 billion Malagasy Francs expected from the private sector in the first five-year plan, only 27.2 were invested between 1964 and 1968. The objective had however been exceeded in the secondary sector, with 12.44 billion Malagasy francs rather than the projected 10.7 billion. Industry remained embryonic, despite an increase in its value from 6.3 billion Malagasy francs in 1960 to 33.6 billion in 1971, an average annual increase of 15%. It was the processing sector which grew the most:

- In the agricultural area, rice mills, starch manufacturers, oil mills, sugar refineries and canning plants were developed.
- In the uplands, the cotton factory of Antsirabe increased its production from 2,100 tonnes to 18,700 tonnes, and the Madagascar paper mill (PAPMAD) was created in Tananarive.
- A petrol refinery was built in the port city of Tamatave.

These developments lead to the creation of 300,000 new jobs in industry, increasing the total from 200,000 in 1960 to 500,000 in 1971.

On the other hand, in the primary sector, private sector initiatives were less numerous. There were several reasons for this: issues with the soil and climate, as well as transport and commercialisation problems. The communication network remained inadequate. Under Tsiranana there were only three railway routes: Tananarive-Tamatave (with a branch leading to Lake Alaotra), Tananarive-Antsirabe, and Fianarantsoa-Manakara. The 3,800 km of roads (2,560 km of which were asphalted) mostly served to link Tananarive to the port cities. Vast regions remained isolated. The ports, although poorly equipped, enabled some degree of cabotage.

Malagasy agriculture thus remained essentially subsistence based under Tsiranana, except in certain sectors, like the production of unshelled rice which grew from 1,200,000 tonnes in 1960 to 1,870,000 tonnes in 1971, an increase of 50%. Self-sufficiency in terms of food was nearly achieved. Each year, between 15,000 and 20,000 tonnes of de luxe rice was exported. Madagascar also increased its export of coffee from 56,000 tonnes in 1962 to 73,000 tonnes in 1971 ad its export of bananas from 15,000 to 20,000 tonnes per year. Finally, under Tsiranana, the island was the world's primary producer of vanilla.

Yet dramatic economic growth did not occur. The GNP per capita only increased by US$30 in the nine years after 1960, reaching only US$131 in 1969. Imports increased, reaching US$28 million in 1969, increasing the trade deficit to US$11 million. A couple of power plants provided electricity to only Tananarive, Tamatave and Fianarantsoa. The annual energy consumption per person only increased a little from 38 kg (carbon equivalent) to 61 kg between 1960 and 1969.

This situation was not catastrophic. Inflation increased annually by 4.1% between 1965 and 1973. The external debt was small. The service of the debt in 1970 represented only 0.8% of GNP. The currency reserves were not negligible - in 1970 they contained 270 million francs. The budget deficit was kept within very strict limits. The low population freed the island from the danger of famine and the bovine population (very important for subsistence farmers) was estimated at 9 million. The leader of the opposition, Marxist pastor Andriamanjato declared that he was "80% in agreement" with the economic policy pursued by Tsiranana.

=== Privileged partnership with France ===
During Tsiranana's presidency, the links between Madagascar and France remained extremely strong in all areas. Tsiranana assured those French people living on the island that they formed Madagascar's 19th tribe.

Tsiranana was surrounded by an entourage of French technical advisors, the "vazahas", of whom the most important were:

- Paul Roulleau, who headed the cabinet and was involved in all economic affairs.
- General Bocchino, Chief of defence, who in practice performed the functions of Minister of Defence.

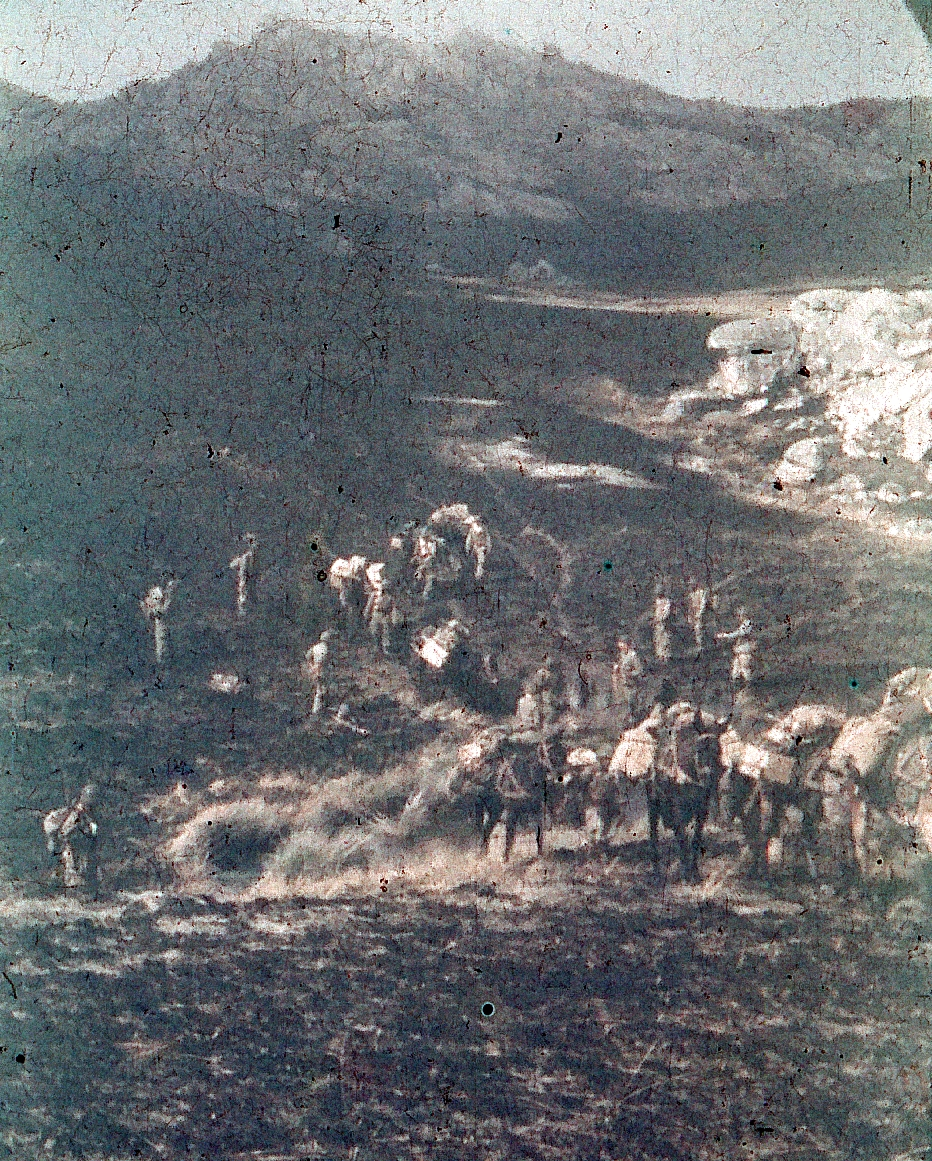
French military manoevres in Madagascar, 1960.

French officials in Madagascar continued to ensure the operation of the administrative machinery until 1963/1964. After that, they were reduced to an advisory role and, with rare exceptions, they lost all influence. In their concern for the renewal of their contracts, some of these adopted an irresponsible and complaisant attitude towards their ministers, directors, or department heads.

The security of the state was placed under the responsibility of French troops, who continued to occupy various strategic bases on the island. French parachutists were based at the Ivato-Tananarive international airport, while the Commander in Chief of the French military forces in the Indian Ocean was based at Diego Suarex harbour at the north end of the country. When the French government decided to withdraw nearly 1,200 troops from Madagascar in January 1964, Tsiranana took offence:

The departure of the French military companies represents a loss of three billion CFA francs for the country. I am in agreement with President Senghor when he says that the decrease of French troops will make large numbers of people unemployed. The presence of French troops is an indirect economic and financial aid and I have always supported its retention in Madagascar.

— Philibert Tsiranana

From independence, Madagascar was in the franc-zone. Membership of this zone allowed Madagascar to assure foreign currency cover for recognised priority imports, to provide a guaranteed market for certain agricultural products (bananas, meat, sugar, de luxe rice, pepper etc.) at above average prices, to secure private investment, and to maintain a certain rigour in the state budget. In 1960, 73% of exports went to the franc-zone, with France among the main trade partners, supplying 10 billion CFA francs to the Malagasy economy.

France provided a particularly important source of aid to the sum of 400 million dollars, for twelve years. This aid, in all its forms, was equal to two thirds of the Malagasy national budget until 1964. Further, thanks to the conventions of association with the European Economic Community (EEC), the advantages arising from the market organisations of the franc-zone, the Aid Fund, and the French Cooperation (FAC), were transferred to the community's level. Madagascar was also able to benefit from appreciable favoured tariff status and received around 160 million dollars in aid from the EEC between 1965 and 1971.

Beyond this strong financial dependency, Tsiranana's Madagascar seemed to preserve the preponderant French role in the economy. Banks, insurance agencies, high scale commerce, industry and some agricultural production (sugar, sisal, tobacco, cotton, etc.) remained under the control of the foreign minority.

=== Foreign Policy ===
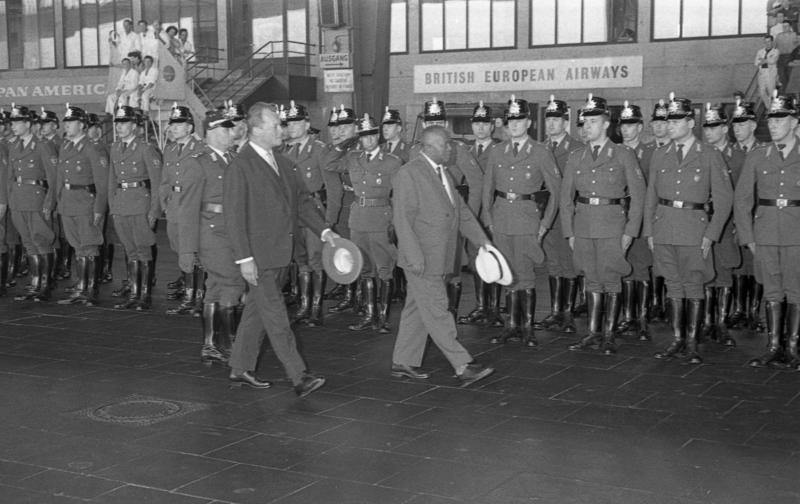
Philibert Tsiranana in West Berlin in 1962, accompanied by Willy Brandt, Governing Mayor of West Berlin

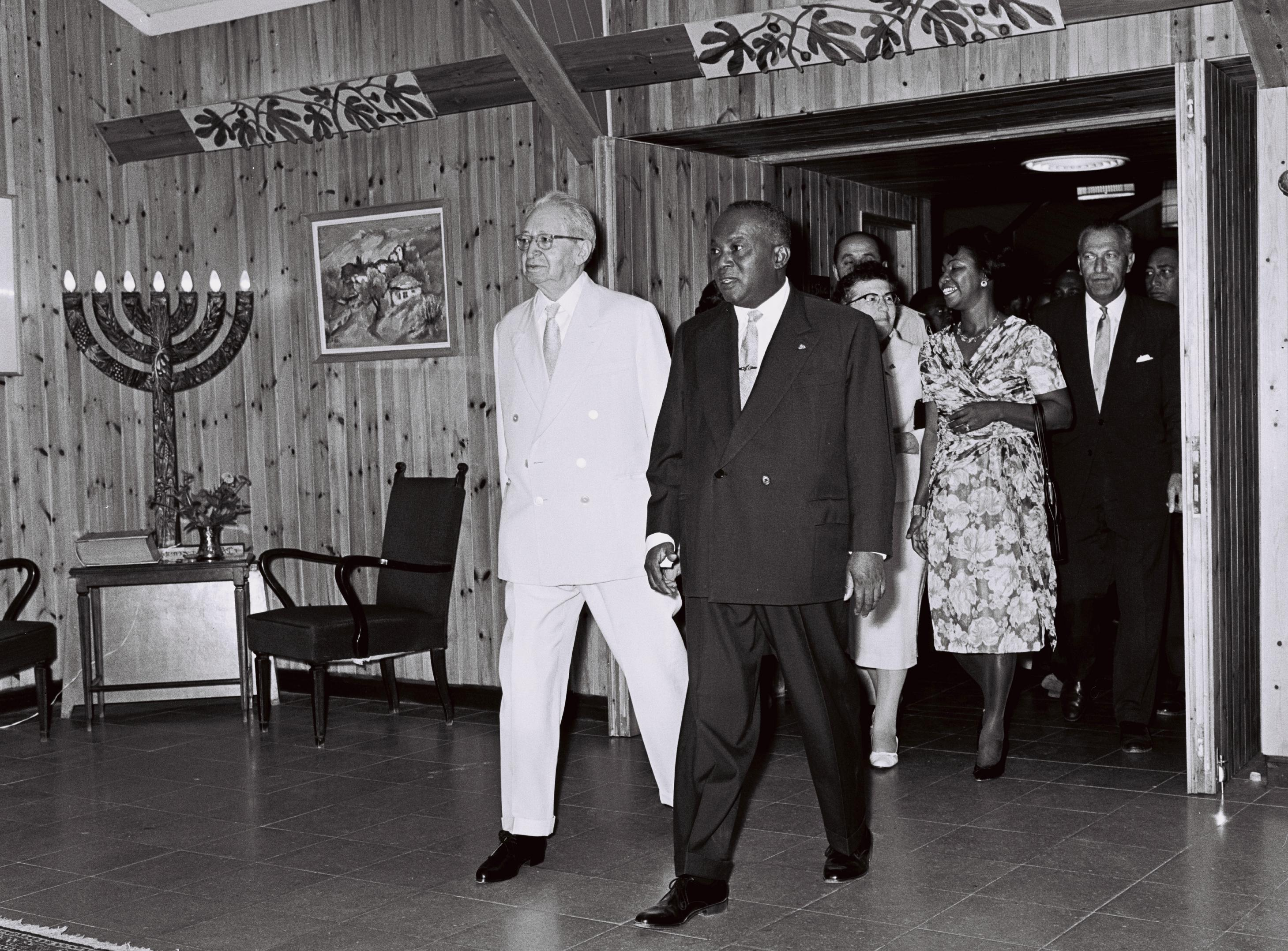
Philibert Tsiranana in Jerusalem in 1961, with Yitzhak Ben-Zvi, President of Israel.

This partnership with France gave the impression that Madagascar was completely committed to the old metropole and voluntarily accepted an invasive neo-colonialism. In fact, by this French policy, Tsiranana simply tried to extract the maximum amount of profit for his country in the face of the insurmountable constraints against seeking other ways. In order to free himself from French economic oversight, Tsiranana made diplomatic and commercial links with other states sharing his ideology:

- West Germany, which imported around 585 million CFA francs of Malagasy products in 1960. West Germany signed an economic collaboration treaty with Madagascar on 21 September 1962, which granted Madagascar 1.5 billion CFA francs of credit. Further, the Philibert Tsiranana Foundation, instituted in 1965 and charged with forming political and administrative recruits for the PSD, was funded by the Social Democratic Party of Germany.
- The United States, which imported around 2 billion CFA francs of Malagasy products in 1960, granted 850 million CFAfrancs between 1961 and 1964.
- Taiwan, which sought to continue relations after his visit to the island in April 1962.

An attempt at a commercial overture towards the Communist bloc and southern Africa including Malawi and South Africa. But this eclecticism provoked some controversy, particularly when the results were not visible.

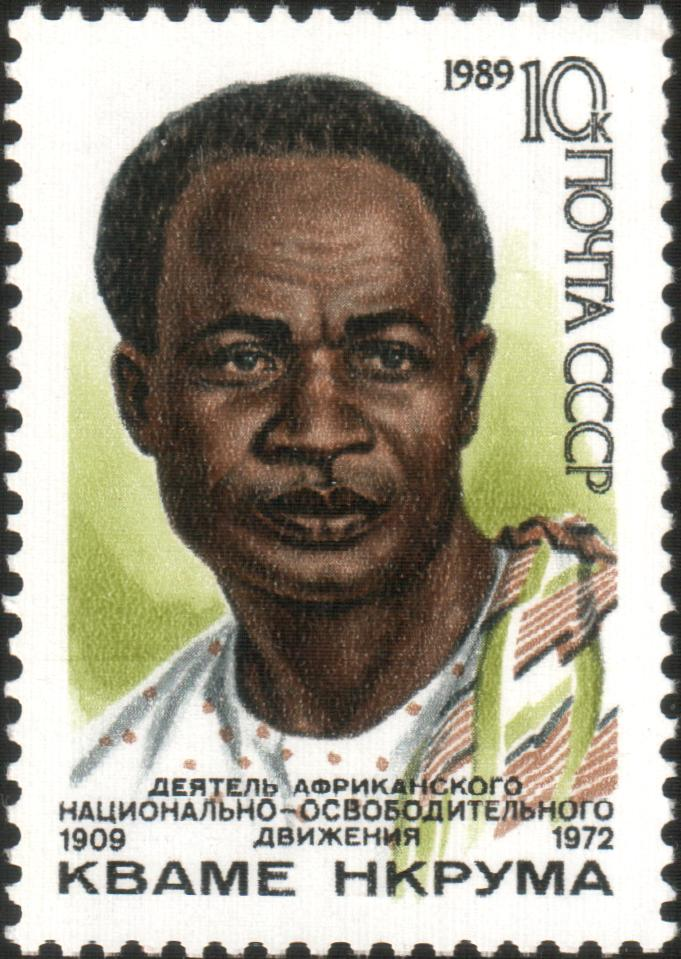
Soviet stamp depicting Kwame Nkrumah.

Tsiranana advocated moderation and realism in international organs like the United Nations, the Organisation of African Unity (OAU), and the African and Malagasy Union (AMU). He was opposed to the Panafricanist ideas proposed by Kwame Nkrumah. For his part, he undertook to cooperate with Africa in the economic sphere, but not in the political arena. During the second summit of the OAU in Cairo on 19 July 1964, he declared that the organisation was weakened by three illnesses:

"Verbosity," because the whole world can give a speech... "Demagoguery," because we make promises which we cannot keep... "Complexity," because many of us do not dare to say what we think on certain issues

— Philibert Tsiranana

He served as mediator from 6–13 March 1961, during a round-table organised by him in Tananarive to permit the various belligerents in the Congo Crisis to work out a solution to the conflict. It was decided to transform the Republic of Congo into a confederation, led by Joseph Kasavubu. But this mediation was in vain, since the conflict soon resumed.

If Tsiranana seemed moderate, he was nevertheless deeply anti-communist. He did not hesitate to boycott the third conference of the OAU held at Accra in October 1965 by the radical President of Ghana, Kwame Nkrumah. On 5 November 1965, he attacked the People's Republic of China and affirmed that "coups d'etat always bear the traces of Communist China." A little later, on 5 January 1966, after the Saint-Sylvestre coup d'état in the Central African Republic, he went so far as to praise those who carried out the coup:

What pleased me in the attitude of colonel Bokassa, is that he has been able to hunt down the communists!"

— Philibert Tsiranana

== Decline and fall of the regime (1967-1972) ==
From 1967, Tsiranana faced mounting criticism. In the first place, it was clear that the structures put in place by "Malagasy Socialism" to develop the country were not having a major macro-economic effect. Further, some measures were unpopular, like the ban on the mini-skirt, which was an obstacle to tourism.

In November 1968, a document entitled Dix années de République (Ten Years of the Republic) was published, which had been drafted by a French technical assistant and a Malagasy and which harshly criticised the leaders of PSD, denouncing some financial scandals which the authors attributed to members of the government. An investigation was initiated which culminated in the imprisonment of one of the authors. Intellectuals were provoked by this affair. Finally, the inevitable wear of the regime over time created a subdued but clear undercurrent of opposition.

=== Challenges to the Francophile policy ===
Between 1960 and 1972, both Merina and coastal Malagasy were largely convinced that although political independence had been realised, economic independence had not been. The French controlled the economy and held almost all the technical posts of the Malagasy senior civil service. The revision of the Franco-Malagasy accords and significant nationalisation were seen by many Malagasy as offering a way to free up between five and ten thousand jobs, then held by Europeans, which could be replaced by locals.

Another centre of opposition was Madagascar's membership of the franc-zone. Contemporary opinion had it that as long as Madagascar remained in this zone, only subsidiaries and branches of French banks would do business in Madagascar. These banks were unwilling to take any risk to support the establishment of Malagasy enterprises, using insufficient guarantees as their excuse. In addition, the Malagasy had only limited access to credit, compared to the French, who received priority. Finally, membership of the franc-zone involved regular restrictions on the free movement of goods.

In 1963 at the 8th PSD congress, some leaders of the governing party raised the possibility of revising the Franco-Malagasy accords. At the 11th congress in 1967, their revision was practically demanded. André Resampa, the strongman of the regime, was the proponent of this.

=== Tsiranana's illness ===
Tsiranana suffered from cardiovascular disease. In June 1966, his health degraded sharply; he was forced to spend two and half months convalescing, and to spend three weeks in France receiving treatment. Officially, Tsiranana's sickness was simply one brought on by fatigue. Subsequently, Tsiranana frequently visited Paris for examinations and the French Riviera for rest. Despite this, his health did not improve.

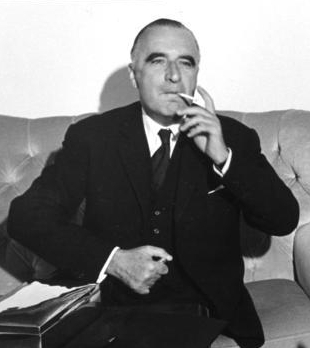
Georges Pompidou.

After being absent for some time, Tsiranana reaffirmed his authority and his role as head of government at the end of 1969. He announced on 2 December, to general surprise, that he would "dissolve" the government, despite the fact that this was not constitutional without a motion of censure. A fortnight later, he formed a new government, which was the same as the old one except for two exceptions. In January 1970, while he was once again absent in France, his health deteriorated suddenly. The French President Georges Pompidou said to Jacques Foccart:

Tsiranana made a very poor impression on me physically. He had a paper before his eyes and could not read it. He did not seem on top of his business at all and he spoke to me only about minor details, minor things and not general policy.

— Georges Pompidou

Nevertheless, Tsiranana travelled to Yaoundé to participate in an OCAM meeting. On his arrival in the Cameroonian capital on 28 January 1970, he had a heart attack and had to be taken back to Paris on a special flight to be treated at Pitié-Salpêtrière Hospital. The President was in a coma for ten days, but when he awoke he retained almost all his faculties and the power of speech. He remained in hospital until 14 May 1970. During this three and a half month period, he received visits from numerous French and Malagasy politicians, including, on 8 April, the head of the opposition, Richard Andriamanjato, who was on his way back from Moscow.

On 24 May, Tsiranana returned to Madagascar. In December 1970, he announced his decision to remain in power because he considered himself to have recovered his health. But his political decline had only just begun. Encouraged by the cult of personality which surrounded him, Tsiranana became authoritarian and irritable. He sometimes claimed divine support:

Didn't God chose David, a poor farmer, to be king of Israel? And didn't God take a humble cattle farmer from a lonely village of Madagascar to be head of an entire people?

— Philibert Tsiranana

In fact, cut off from reality by an entourage of self-interested courtiers, he showed himself unable to appreciate the socio-economic situation.

=== Succession conflicts ===
The competition for the succession to Tsiranana began in 1964. On achieving control, a muffled battle broke out between two wings of the PSD. On the one side was the moderate, liberal and Christian wing symbolised by Jacques Rabemananjara, which was opposed by the progressivist tendency represented by the powerful minister of the interior, André Resampa. In that year, Rabemananjara, then minister of the economy, was victim of a campaign of accusations led by a group in the Tananarive press, which included PSD affiliated journalists. Rabemananjara was accused of corruption in an affair related to the supply of rice. The campaign was inspired by senator Rakotondrazaka, a very close associate of André Resampa; the senator proved incapable of supplying the slightest proof of these allegations.

Tsiranana did nothing to defend Rabemananjara's honour, who exchanged the Economy portfolio for agriculture on 31 August 1965 and then took the foreign affairs portfolio in July 1967. Some austerity measures and spending cuts concerning cabinet ministers were introduced in September 1965: cancellation of various perks and allowances, including notably the use of administrative vehicles. But the government's image had been tarnished.

Paradoxically, on 14 February 1967, Tsiranana encouraged government officials and members of parliamenta to participate in the effort to industrialise the country, by participating in business enterprises which had become established in the provinces. In his mind, he was encouraging entrepreneurs in their activities and the involvement of political personalities was presented by him as a patriotic gesture to promote the development of investments throughout the country. However, corruption was clearly visible in the countryside, where even the slightest enterprise required the payment of bribes.

In 1968, André Resampa, the Minister of the Interior, appeared to be Tsiranana's chosen successor. During Tsiranana's emergency hospitalisation in January 1970, however, Resampa's dominance was far from clear. Aside from Jacques Rabemananjara, Alfred Nany, who was President of the National Assembly, nurtured presidential ambitions. Resampa's main adversary however was Vice-President Calvin Tsiebo who benefitted from constitutional provisions concerning the exercise of power in the absence of the president and had the support of "Monsieur Afrique de l’Élysée" Jacques Foccart, the President of France's chief of staff for African and Madagascan affairs.

After Tsiranana re-established himself in 1970, a rapid revision of the constitution was carried out. Four Vice-Presidents were placed in charge of a much enlarged government, attempting to prevent fear of a power void. Resampa was officially invested with the First Vice-Presidency of the government, while Tsiebo was relegated to a subordinate role. Resampa seemed to have won the contest.

Then relations between Tsiranana and Resampa deteriorated. Resampa, who supported the denunciation of the Franco-Malagasy Accords, got the National Council of PSD to pass a motion calling for their revision on 7 November 1970. Tsiranana was outraged. He let his entourage persuade him that Rasempa was involved in a "conspiracy." On the evening of 26 January 1971, Tsiranana ordered the gendarmerie in Tananarive to be reinforced, put the army on alert, and increased the Presidential Palace Guard. On 17 February 1971, he dissolved the government. Resampa lost the ministry of the interior, which Tsiranana took over personal control of, and Tsiebo became the First Vice-President.

According to the diaries published by Foccart, France did not take any particular pleasure in these events. Foccart is meant to have said to the French President Pompidou on 2 April 1971:

I believe that all this arises from Tiranana's senility and stubbornness. He has liquidated his Minister of the Interior and dismissed the colleagues of the latter who understand the issues. His country is now breaking apart. Logically, he must now recognise his mistake and recall Resampa; but everything supports the belief that, on the contrary, he will have Resampa arrested, which would be a catastrophe.

— Jacque Foccart

On 1 June 1971, André Resampa was arrested on the instruction of the council of ministers. He was accused of conspiring with the American government and was placed under house arrest on the small island of Sainte-Marie. Some years later, Tsiranana confessed that this conspiracy was fabricated.

=== Rotaka ===
At the legislative elections of 6 September 1970, the PSD won 104 seats, while the AKFM secured three. The opposition party submitted some 600 complaints about the conduct of the election, none of which were investigated. In the Presidential election of 30 January 1972, 98.8% of registered voters took part and Tsiranana, who ran without opposition, was re-elected with 99.72% of votes. During the election however, a few journalists had property seized and there was a witchhunt of publications criticising the results of the vote, the methods employed to achieve victory, and the threats and pressure brought to bear on voters in order to get them to the ballot box.

Tsiranana's "restrained democracy" showed its weakness. Convinced that they could not succeed at the polls, the opposition decided to take to the streets. This opposition was supported by the Merina elite which Tsiranana and Resampa had pushed far from the centres of decision making.

==== Farmer Protests ====
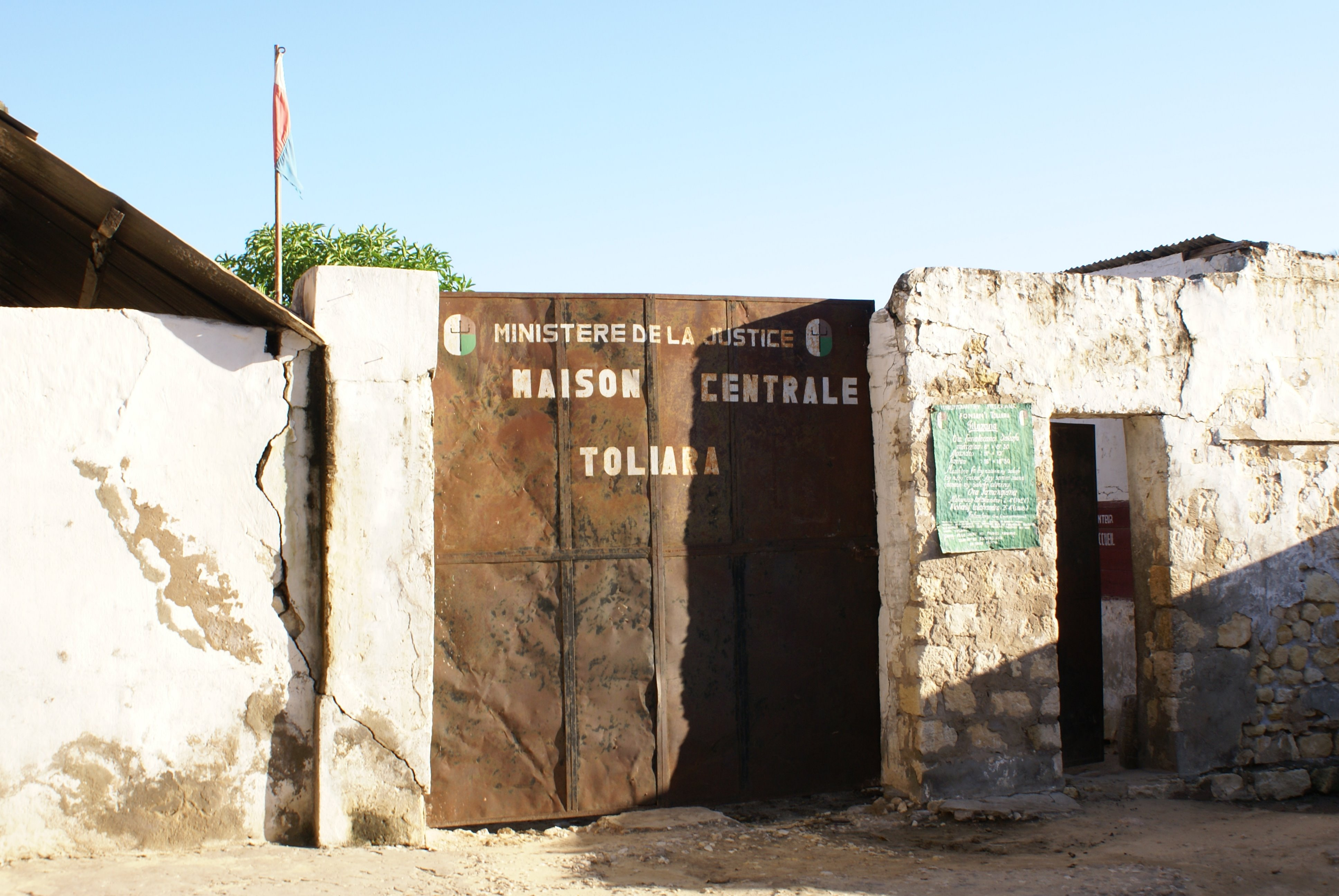
Entrance of Toliara gaol.

In the night of 31 March and 1 April 1971, an insurrection was launched in the south of Madagascar, particularly in the city of Toliara and the region around it. The rebels, led by Monja Jaona, consisted of ranchers from the south-east who refused to pay their heavy taxes and exorbitant mandatory fees to the PSD party. The area, which was particularly poor, had been long awaiting aid since it frequently suffered from both droughts and cyclones. MONIMA therefore had no trouble stirring up the people to occupy and loot official buildings.

The insurrection was rapidly and thoroughly suppressed. The official death toll of 45 insurgents was contested by Jaona, who claimed that more than a thousand had died. Jaona was arrested and his party was banned. The exactions of the gendarmerie (whose commander, Colonel Richard Ratsimandrava would later be president in 1975 for six days before his assassination) in response to the insurrection triggered a strong hostility to the "PSD state" across the country. Tsiranana attempted to appease the populace. He criticised the behaviour of some hard-line officials who had exploited the poor; he also condemned the officials who had abused and extorted money and cattle from people returning to their villages after the insurrection.

==== The Malagasy May ====
In mid-March, the government's failure to address the demands of medical students spurred a protest movement at Befelatanana school in the capital. On 24 March 1971, a university protest was announced by the Federation of Student Associations of Madagascar (FAEM), in support of AKFM. It was observed by around 80% of the country's five thousand students. The next day, Tsiranana ordered the closure of the university, saying:

The government will not tolerate in any fashion, the use of a problem strictly related to the university for political ends.

— Philibert Tsiranana

On 19 April 1972, the Association of Medical and Pharmaceutical Students, which had originally made the demands, was dissolved. This measure was enacted by the new strongman of the regime, Minister of the Interior Barthélémy Johasy, who also reinforced the censorship of the press. In protest against this policy, the universities and lycées of the capital initiated a new round of protests from 24 April. Talks were held between the government and the protestors, but each side maintained their position. The protest spread, reaching Fianarantsoa on 28 April and Antsirabe on 29 April. It was then massively augmented by secondary school students in the provincial towns, who denounced "the Franco-Malagasy accords and the crimes of cultural imperialism."

The authorities were overstretched and panicked. They had 380 students and student-sympathisers arrested on the evening of 12 May, in order to be imprisoned in the penal colony on Nosy Lava, a small island to the north of Madagascar. The next day, a massive protest against the regime in Tananarive was led by some five thousand students. The forces of order, consisting of a few dozen members of the Republican Security Forces (FRS), were completely overwhelmed by events; they fired on the protesters. But order was not restored. On the contrary, the protest increased. The official death toll of 13 May was 7 members of the FRS and 21 protesters, with more than 200 wounded.

This violence caused most officials in the capital and the employees of many businesses to cease work, which further discredited the government. On 15 May, several thousand protesters marched on the Presidential Palace, seeking the return of the 380 imprisoned students. The march was marked by a clash with the FRS leading to the deaths of five members of the FRS and five protesters. The gendarmerie was ordered to come to the rescue, but refused to participate in the repression of the populace, while the army adopted an ambiguous position. Finally, the government decided to withdraw the FRS units and replace them with military forces.

Tsiranana had been at a thermal health spa in Ranomafana near Fiarnarantsoa. He now returned to Tananarive, and immediately ordered the 380 prisoners to be freed, which occurred on 16 May. But Tsiranana's authority was more and more openly contested. The opposition took strength on 17 May when the French government announced that the French armed forces on the island "are not intervening and will not intervene in the crisis in Madagascar, which is an internal crisis". Having failed to mobilise his supporters, Tsiranana appointed General Gabriel Ramanantsoa, the Chief of defence, as prime minister. He vested Ramanantsoa with full presidential powers as well.

== Efforts to regain power (1972–1975) ==
Tsiranana was still nominally president, and viewed his grant of full powers to Ramanantsoa as a temporary measure. He told Jacque Foccart on 22 May 1972

I have been elected by the people. I may perhaps be killed, but I will not go willingly. I will die, together with my wife, if it is necessary.

— Philibert Tsiranana

But after 18 May he had no actual power. His presence was politically unhelpful and cumbersome to others. Gradually, Tsiranana became aware of this. During a private trip to Majunga on 22 July, protestors met him with hostile banners, saying things like "we are fed up with you, Papa" and "The PSD is finished." Tsiranana also saw that his statue in the centre of Majunga had been overthrown during the May protests. He was finally convinced that his presidency was over by the constitutional referendum of 8 October 1972, in which 96.43% of voters voted to grant Ramanantsoa full powers for five years, thus confirming Tsiranana's fall from power. Tsiranana officially left office on 11 October.

Describing himself as "President of the Suspended Republic", Tsiranana did not retire from political life and became a virulent opponent of the military regime. General Ramanantsoa informed him that he was not to talk about political decisions and that he was no longer authorised to make declarations to journalists. The PSD experienced judicial harassment with the arrest of many prominent party members. During the consultative elections of the National Popular Development Council (CNPD) on 21 October 1973, the PSD was the victim of electoral irregularities. Candidates supporting the military regime won 130 of the 144 seats up for election.

During this election, Tsiranana reconciled with his old minister André Resampa, who had been released in May 1972 and had subsequently established the Union of Malagasy Socialists (USM). This reconciliation led to the merger of PSD and USM on 10 March 1974, to become the Malagasy Socialist Party (PSM), with Tsiranana as president and Resampa as general secretary. PSM called for a coalition government in order to put an end to economic and social disorder, especially food shortages, linked to the "Malagisation" and "socialisation" of Malagasy society. In a memorandum of 3 February 1975, Tsiranana proposed the creation of a "committee of elders," which would select a well-known person who would form a provisional government in order to organise free and fair elections within ninety days.

== Later life and death (1975–1978) ==
After the resignation of Ramanantsoa and the accession of Richard Ratsimandrava as head of state on 5 February 1975, Tsiranana decided to retire from political life. But six days later, on 11 February 1975, Ratsimandrava was assassinated. An extraordinary military tribunal carried out the "trial of the century." Among the 296 people charged was Tsiranana, who was accused by the eight military chiefs of "complicity in the assassination of Colonel Richard Ratsimandrava, Head of State and of Government." Eventually, Tsiranana was released due to lack of evidence.

After the trial, Tsiranana ceased to have a high profile in Madagascar. He travelled to France for a time to visit his family there and to consult with his doctors. On 14 April 1978 he was transported to Tananarive in a critical state. Admitted to Befelatanana hospital in a coma, he never regained consciousness and he died on Sunday 16 April 1978 late in the afternoon. The Supreme Revolutionary Council, led by Didier Ratsiraka, organised a national funeral for him. The vast crowd in Tananarive, which gathered for the funeral, testified to the public respect and affection for him in the end, which has generally endured since his death.

Tsiranana's wife, Justine Tsiranana, who served as the country's inaugural First Lady, died in 1999. His son Philippe Tsiranana stood in the 2006 presidential election, placing twelfth with only 0.03% of the vote.

== Honours ==
- Philippines: Raja of the Order of Sikatuna (6 August 1964)
- Philippines: Golden Heart Presidential Award (6 August 1964) to First Lady Justine Tsiranana
- Taiwan: Grand Cordon of the Order of Brilliant Jade (1 April 1962)

== Bibliography ==
- Page on the French National Assembly website
- Cadoux, Charles (1969). La République malgache (in French). Berger-Levrault.
- Deleris, Ferdinand [in Occitan] (1986). Ratsiraka: socialisme et misère à Madagascar (in French). Paris: Harmattan. ISBN 978-2-85802-697-5. OCLC 16754065.
- Rabenoro, Césaire (1986). Les relations extérieures de Madagascar de 1960 à 1972 (in French). Paris: Harmattan. ISBN 2858026629.
- Rajoelina, Patrick (1988). Quarante années de la vie politique de Madagascar 1947–1987 (in French). Paris: Harmattan. ISBN 978-2-85802-915-0. OCLC 20723968.
- Saura, André (2006). Philibert Tsiranana, Premier président de la République de Madagascar: À l'ombre de de Gaulle (in French). Vol. I. Paris: Harmattan. ISBN 978-2-296-01330-8. OCLC 76893157.
- Saura, André (2006). Philibert Tsiranana, Premier président de la République de Madagascar: Le crépuscule du pouvoir (in French). Vol. II. Paris: Harmattan. ISBN 978-2-296-01331-5. OCLC 71887916.
- Spacensky, Alain (1970). Madagascar, cinquante ans de vie politique. De Ralaimongo à Tsiranana (in French). Nouvelles éditions latines.
