= André Resampa =

Malagasy politician

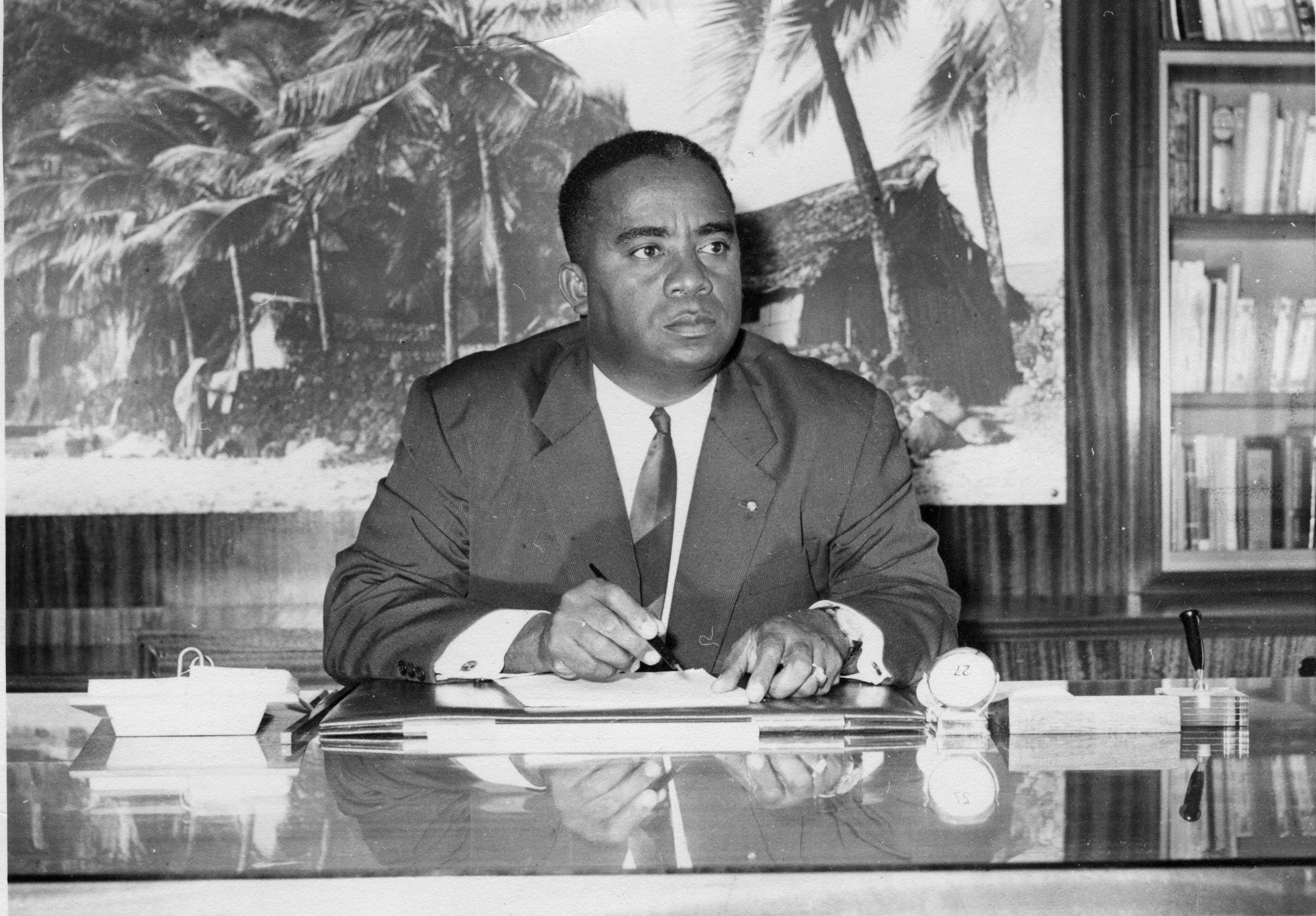

Interior Minister
- In office May 1959 – February 1971
- Preceded by: None (position first established)
- Succeeded by: Philibert Tsiranana

First Vice President of Madagascar
- In office October 1970 – February 1971
- President: Philibert Tsiranana
- Preceded by: Calvin Tsiebo
- Succeeded by: Calvin Tsiebo

Personal details
- Born: 24 June 1924; Mandabe, Madagascar
- Died: 17 May 1993 (aged 68); Madagascar
- Political party: Social Democratic Party

André Resampa (24 June 1924 – 17 May 1993) was a Malagasy politician who was the influential Interior Minister of Madagascar at the beginning of the independence in 1960, and appointed as 1st Vice President of Madagascar from October 1970 until February 1971.

== Biography ==
Born on 24 June 1924, in Mandabe (Mahabo District). He went to Mandabe's primary school then to the regional school of Morondava. He attended courses at the Administrative Section of Ecole Le Myre de vilers where he graduated. He then entered the Administration as a Writer-Interpret and changed his way to Judicial Services and became Court Secretary. He earned a Law Certificate and was named Director of Court Secretaries.

== Political career ==
Recipient of six honors, he was elected member of the Tulear's Provincial Assembly in 1952, and was reelected in 1957. That same year, he was designated to become Parliament Representative, then elected member of the National Assembly in October 1958. Meanwhile, he had been elected member of the Government Counsel on May 27, 1957, as the Education Minister and later on Social Affairs. Nominated in May 1959, as Interior Minister, he kept his mandate after the 10 October 1960's Constitution of the Government became effective. He continued as minister of interior in 1965.

Political offices
Preceded by None	Interior Minister; 1960–1971	Unknown
