= List of gendarmeries =

A gendarmerie or gendarmery is a military force with law enforcement duties among the civilian population. The term maréchaussée (lit. 'marshalcy') may also be used (e.g., Royal Marechaussee) but is now uncommon.

Although pioneered in France, the concept of a gendarmerie was adopted by several other European nations during the Napoleonic Wars. It remains an integral part of the military establishment in most Francophone states and territories. A somewhat related phenomenon has been the formation of paramilitary units which fall under the authority of civilian police agencies. Since these are not strictly military forces, however, they are not considered gendarmeries. 20 gendarmeries and 1 observer are part of the International Association of Gendarmeries and Police Forces with Military Status (FIEP) as of 2024. 7 EU states are part of the European Gendarmerie Force, with 1 partner and 1 observer.

== List of active gendarmeries ==
| Country or territory | Image | English name | Native-language name | Notes | Refs. |
|---|---|---|---|---|---|
| Algeria | | National Gendarmerie | Gendarmerie Nationale (الدرك الوطني) | Formed in 1962 following Algerian independence and attached to the Ministry of Defence | |
| Argentina | | Argentine National Gendarmerie | Gendarmería Nacional Argentina | Formed in 1938, and a member of FIEP | |
| Azerbaijan | | Internal Troops of Azerbaijan | Azərbaycan Respublikası Daxili Qoşunları | | |
| Belarus | | Internal Troops | Унутраныя войскі (Unutranyja vojski); Внутренние войска (Vnutrennie voyska) | | |
| Bosnia and Herzegovina (Republika Srpska) | | Gendarmerie of Republika Srpska | Жандармерија Републике Српске (Žandarmerija Republike Srpske) | Bosnia and Herzegovina has two major entity-level ministries of interior, so only Republika Srpska has gendarmerie type unit formed in September 2019. | |
| Brazil | | Military Police | Polícia Militar | Brazilian states have their own gendarmeries. Member of FIEP | |
| Bulgaria | | Gendarmerie (Bulgaria) | Жандармерия (Zhandarmeriya) | | |
| Burkina Faso | | National Gendarmerie | Gendarmerie Nationale | Established in 1960 following independence as part of the army, and operates within the Defence Ministry | |
| Bhutan | | Royal Bhutan Police | རྒྱལ་གཞུང་འབྲུག་གི་འགག་སྡེ (gyal-zhung druk-ki gaag-de) | | |
| Cambodia | | Royal Gendarmerie of Cambodia | កងរាជអាវុធហត្ថ (kangreachaavouthohat) | First formed in 1954 and operated until the Khmer Rouge dictatorship in 1975. Reformed in 1993 with assistance from France. | |
| Cameroon | | National Gendarmerie | Gendarmerie Nationale | Formed in 1960, and operates under the Defence Ministry as one of the two primary law enforcement organisations, alongside the Cameroonian National Police | |
| Central African Republic | | Gendarmerie | | | |
| Chad | | National Gendarmerie | Gendarmerie Nationale | Created following independence from France in 1960 | |
| Chile | | Carabineros of Chile | Carabineros de Chile | Formed in 1903 as part of the army. In 1927 it was merged with the civilian Fiscal Police and Rural Police to create the Carabineros de Chile. Member of FIEP | |
| China | | People's Armed Police | 中国人民武装警察部队 (Zhōngguó Rénmín Wǔzhuāng Jǐngchá Bùduì) | Formed in 1982, the PAP perform military-civilian police duties. The PAP is a component of the Paramilitary forces of China. | |
| Comoros | | Gendarmerie | | Formed in 1978 | |
| Republic of the Congo | | Congolese National Gendarmerie | | Initially formed in 1960 following independence before being dissolved and split between the Army and Police in 1970. Restored in 1991 and shares policing duties with the National Police. Controlled by the Defense Ministry | |
| Côte d'Ivoire | | Gendarmerie | | In 1958 the French Gendarmerie began to supervise the first elements of the Ivorian Republican Guard, before becoming the National Gendarmerie following independence in 1960 | |
| Djibouti | | Djiboutian National Gendarmerie | Gendarmerie Nationale Djiboutienne | The first French Gendarmes arrived in 1919, following independence in 1977 the Djiboutian Gendarmerie was created and is primarily under the Ministry of Defense. Member of FIEP | |
| Dominican Republic | | Dominican Republic National Police | Policía Nacional Dominicana | | |
| France | | National Gendarmerie | Gendarmerie Nationale | Established in 1791 and member of FIEP and the European Gendarmerie Force | |
| Gabon | | National Gendarmerie | Gendarmerie Nationale | Formed in 1960 following independence with Gabonization occurring in 1964. A branch of the Defense Ministry | |
| Guinea | | Gendarmerie | | Formed following independence in 1958 and shares policing duties with the National Police | |
| Guinea-Bissau | | National Guard | Guarda Nacional | Created in 2010 through the merger of several former security agencies. Modeled on the Portuguese National Republican Guard and other similar organizations. | |
| Hungary | | Law Enforcement and Public Safety Service | Rendészeti Biztonsági Szolgálat | | |
| Israel | | Israel Border Police | משמר הגבול | | |
| Israel | | National Guard of Israel | המשמר הלאומי של ישראל | | |
| Iran | | Islamic Revolutionary Guard Corps | سپاه پاسداران انقلاب اسلامی | Established in 5 May 1979. It is part of the Islamic Republic of Iran Armed Forces. | |
| Iraq (Kurdistan Region) | | Zeravani | Zêrevanî (زێرەڤانی) | Established in 1997 and has been described as a gendarmerie. Under the operational control of the Kurdistan Regional Government's Ministry of Interior, but are part of the Peshmerga armed forces of Iraqi Kurdistan. | |
| Italy | | Corps of Carabineers | Arma dei Carabinieri | The Carabinieri is a component of the Italian Armed Forces. Formed in 1814 and a part of the Defence Ministry but coordinated by the Interior Ministry. Member of FIEP and the European Gendarmerie Force | |
| Jordan | | General Directorate of Gendarmerie | قوات الدرك الأردني | Established in 2008 and member of FIEP | |
| Kazakhstan | | National Guard of Kazakhstan | Ұлттық ұланы, Ūlttyq ūlany | Established in 2014 on the basis of Kazakhstan Interior Troops | |
| Kuwait | | Kuwait National Guard | الحرس الوطني الكويتي | Member of FIEP | |
| Lithuania | | Public Safety Service | Viešojo saugumo tarnyba | Created following independence in 1991 as the Internal Service Unit and reorganised in 2002. | |
| Madagascar | | National Gendarmerie | Gendarmerie Nationale | Formed following independence in 1960 and reports to the National Defence Ministry | |
| Mali | | National Gendarmerie | Gendarmerie Nationale | Established in 1960 and shares policing duties with the National Police. Administratively controlled by the Ministry of Defence, with operational control shared between the Ministry of Defense and the Ministry of Security and Civil Protection. | |
| Mauritania | | National Gendarmerie | Gendarmerie Nationale | Established in 1960 and part of the Defence Ministry | |
| Mexico | | National Guard | Guardia Nacional | The National Guard was created in 2019 by merging the Federal Police (including the National Gendarmerie). | |
| Moldova | | Carabinier Troops | Trupele de Carabinieri | Created in 1991 under the control of the Ministry of Internal Affairs. FIEP observer | |
| Monaco | | Prince's Company of Carabiniers | Compagnie des Carabiniers du Prince | The Corps des Sapeurs-Pompiers provide an armed support service. | |
| Mongolia | | National Police Agency | Цагдаагийн Ерөнхий Газар (Tsagdaagiin Erönkhii Gazar) | | |
| Mongolia | | Internal Troops of Mongolia | Монгол Улсын Дотоод цэргүүд | Disestablished in 2013, reestablished in 2017 | |
| Morocco | | Royal Moroccan Gendarmerie | Gendarmerie Royale (الدرك الملكي) | Formed in 1957 and with law enforcement primarily in rural areas. Member of FIEP | |
| Netherlands | | Royal Marechaussee | Koninklijke Marechaussee | Established in 1814, and part of the Ministry of Defence although non-military operations are performed under the Ministry of Justice and Security and Ministry of the Interior and Kingdom Relations. Member of FIEP and the European Gendarmerie Force | |
| Niger | | National Gendarmerie | Gendarmerie Nationale Nigérienne | Established in 1960 and part of the Defence Ministry | |
| Palestine | | Palestinian National Security Forces | قوات الأمن الوطني الفلسطيني (Quwwat al-Amn al-Watani al-Filastini) | Member of FIEP | |
| Pakistan | | Pakistan Levies | | | |
| Pakistan | | Federal Constabulary | جمیعتِ سپاہیانِ سرحدی | | |
| Poland | | Military Gendarmerie | Żandarmeria Wojskowa | Created in 1812 and directed by the Ministry of Defence. Member of the European Gendarmerie Force | |
| Portugal | | National Republican Guard | Guarda Nacional Republicana | Precursor units date back to 1801, with the National Republican Guard created in 1911. In peacetime it responds to the Ministry of Internal Administration, and in wartime the Ministry of National Defence. Member of FIEP and the European Gendarmerie Force | |
| Romania | | Romanian Gendarmerie | Jandarmeria Română | Formed in 1850 and under the control of the Ministry of Internal Affairs. Member of FIEP and the European Gendarmerie Force | |
| Qatar | | Internal Security Force | لخويا | Established in 2003 as part of the Interior Ministry. Member of FIEP | |
| Russia | | National Guard of Russia (Rosgvardiya) | Федеральная служба войск национальной гвардии РФ (Росгвардия) | The first Russian gendarmerie units were created in 1817 with the current National Guard established in 2016 containing SOBR, OMON, and the Internal Troops and reporting directly to the President. | |
| San Marino | | Corps of Gendarmerie of San Marino | Gendarmeria | Established in 1824 and member of FIEP | |
| Saudi Arabia | | Saudi Arabian National Guard | الحَرَس الوَطنيّ (al-Ḥaras al-Waṭanī) | | |
| Senegal | | Senegalese Gendarmerie | Gendarmerie Nationale | Established in 1962 The Gendarmerie and civilian National Police are the two main law enforcement bodies. It is under the responsibility of the Ministry of Armed Forces. Member of FIEP | |
| Serbia | | Gendarmery | Жандармерија (Žandarmerija) | Originally formed in 1860, it was disbanded in 1945 and re-established in 2001. | |
| Spain | | Civil Guard | Guardia Civil | Formed in 1844 with control for functions shared between the Ministry of Defence and Ministry of the Interior and one of the two national Policing bodies. Member of FIEP and the European Gendarmerie Force | |
| Taiwan | | Military Police | 中華民國憲兵 | may be mobilized by prosecutors to investigate civilian crimes | |
| Tajikistan | | Internal Troops | Қӯшунҳои дохилӣ | | |
| Togo | | National Gendarmerie | Gendarmerie Nationale | Created in 1962 and is part of the Ministry of Defense, although may report to the Ministry of Security and Civil Protection for law enforcement. | |
| Tunisia | | National Guard | Garde Nationale | Member of FIEP | |
| Turkey | | Gendarmerie General Command | Jandarma Genel Komutanlığı | Subordinate to the Turkish Ministry of Interior since 2016. Member of FIEP and observer of the European Gendarmerie Force | |
| Turkmenistan | | Internal Troops | Türkmenistanyň içeri işler edaralarynyň işgärlerine | | |
| Turkmenistan | | Turkmen National Guard | Türkmenistanyň Milli Garawul | | |
| Ukraine | | National Guard | Національна гвардія України (Natsionalna hvardiia Ukrainy) | Created 1991 from the Internal Troops of Ukrainian SSR, reverted to old name between 2000 and 2014. Member of FIEP | |
| United States | | United States Coast Guard | | The United States Coast Guard (USCG) is the maritime security, search and rescue, law enforcement, and military service branch of the United States Armed Forces and one of the country's eight uniformed services. The Coast Guard is a maritime, military, multi-mission service unique among the U.S. military branches for having a maritime law enforcement mission with jurisdiction in both domestic and international waters and a federal regulatory agency mission as part of its duties. | |
| Uzbekistan | | Uzbekistan National Guard | Oʻzbekiston Respublikasi Milliy gvardiyasi | | |
| Vatican City | | Corps of Gendarmerie of Vatican City | Corpo della Gendarmeria dello Stato della Città del Vaticano | General responsibility for security and public order which encompasses all regular police duties, including border control, crime prevention and investigation, and enforcement of financial and commercial regulations. | |
| Vietnam | | Mobile Police Command | Bộ Tư lệnh Cảnh sát Cơ động (K02) | | |
| Europe | | European Gendarmerie Force | French: Force de gendarmerie européenne Italian: Forza di Gendarmeria Europea; Portuguese: Força de Gendarmaria Europeia; Spanish: Fuerza de Gendarmería Europea | Formed by seven members of the European Union: France, Italy, The Netherlands, Poland, Portugal, Romania, and Spain. The European Gendarmerie Force was created as an intervention force at the service of the EU, the NATO, the UN, the OSCE, or other "ad hoc" alliances. It is characterized by its robustness, and quick deployability, and it specializes in the management of crisis areas. Lithuania is currently a Partner Member, and Turkey has Observer status. | |

== List of former gendarmeries ==
| Country or territory | English name | Native-language name | Formed | Disbanded | Notes |
|---|---|---|---|---|---|
| Democratic Republic Of Afghanistan | Defenders of the Revolution | Sarandoy | 1978 | 1992 | Formed after the Saur Revolution, Sarandoy was dominated by the Khalq faction of the People's Democratic Party of Afghanistan and would often clash with the Parchamite Dominated Khad. |
| Islamic Republic of Afghanistan | Afghan National Civil Order Force | | 2006 | 2020 | Originally part of Afghan National Police, most personnel transferred to Afghan National Army in 2018 |
| Albania | International Gendarmerie | | 1913 | 1914 | |
| Albania | Royal Albanian Gendarmerie | Xhandarmëria Mbretërore e Shqipëris | 1919 | 1939 | Formed as a counterweight to the Royal Albanian Army, it employed British advisors on its staff and with the units |
| Austria | Imperial and Royal Gendarmerie | k.k. Gendarmerie | 1849 | 1918 | Gendarmerie of Cisleithanian part of Austria-Hungary |
| Austria | Federal Gendarmerie | Bundesgendarmerie | 1918 | 2005 | Renamed k.k. Gendarmerie, dissolved under occupation from 1938 to 1945. Merged with other agencies to form new Bundespolizei in 2005 |
| Austria | B-Gendarmerie | | 1949 | 1955 | The precursor of the Austrian Armed Forces |
| Azerbaijan | Special Purpose Police Unit | Xüsusi Təyinatlı Polis Dəstəsi | 1990 | 1995 | Fought in the First Nagorno-Karabakh war, disbanded after mutiny |
| Baden | Grand Duchy of Baden Gendarmerie Corps | | 1829 | 1918 | Part of the Baden Army until 1870 when the Army became part of the Prussian Army. Subordinated to the Ministry of the Interior. Strength 248 – 560 gendarmes in six, later four, districts. |
| Belgium | Belgian Gendarmerie | French: Gendarmerie; Dutch: Rijkswacht | 1796 | 2001 | Was formed under French rule in what now is Belgian territory, even before the establishment of Belgium itself (1830). Merged with federal and local police to form a new policing system |
| Belgium | Garde Civique | Dutch: Burgerwacht | 1830 | 1920 | |
| Benin | National Gendarmerie | French: Gendarmerie Nationale | 1960 | 2018 | Merged with the civilian National Police in 2018 to become the Republican Police of Benin |
| Bulgaria | Bulgarian Gendarmerie | Zhandarmeriya | | | The Bulgarian Gendarmerie was disbanded by the country's General Directorate of Police, and its personnel were absorbed into various specialized police units. |
| Burundi | National Gendarmerie | Gendarmerie Nationale | 1962 | 2004 | |
| Canada | North-West Mounted Police | | 1873 | 1920 | Merged with the Dominion Police to create Royal Canadian Mounted Police |
| Colombia | National Gendarmerie Corps | Cuerpo de Gendarmeria Nacional | 1906 | 1909 | Created to function decentralized from the National Police command and more militarized regime, managed by the Ministry of War. In 1909 General Jorge Holguín suppressed the National Gendarmerie Corps and gave the provincial governors the authority to organize police services at their own will |
| Cretan State | Cretan Gendarmerie | Κρητική Χωροφυλακή, Kritiki Chorofylaki | 1899 | 1916 | |
| Cyprus | Cyprus Military Police | Κυπριακή Στρατιωτική Αστυνομία; Kıbrıs Jandarması | 1880 | 1935 | |
| Czechoslovakia | Czechoslovak Gendarmerie | Československé četnictvo | 1918 | 1942 | Managed by the Ministry of Interior. In 1942 merged with police and fire brigades. After the liberation in 1945 created a unified police force—the Corps of National Security (SNB)—that amalgamated gendarmerie, police and intelligence. |
| Denmark | Border Gendarmerie | Grænsegendarmeriet | 1838 | 1958 | |
| Denmark | The Blue Gendarms | De Blå Gendarmer | 1885 | 1897 | |
| Denmark | The Royal Danish West Indies Gendarmerie Corps | Det Kongelige Dansk Vestindiske Gendarmerikorps | 1907 | 1917 | |
| (Netherlands) Dutch East Indies | Marshal Corps On Foot | Korps Marechaussee te voet | 1890 | 1942 | |
| Ethiopia | Ethiopian Gendarmery | Zabagna | 1916 | 1936 | Included the Kebur Zabagna Imperial Guard |
| Georgia | Internal Troops of Georgia | საქართველოს შინაგანი ჯარები sak'art'velos shinagani jarebi | 1991 | 2004 | |
| German Empire | Field Gendarmerie | Feldgendarmerie | 1866 | 1918 | Military police units of the army of the German Empire. |
| Nazi Germany | Field Gendarmerie | Feldgendarmerie | 1933 | 1945 | Military police units of the Wehrmacht of Nazi Germany. |
| Germany | Gendarmerie | Gendarmerie, Landjägerei (rural ranger), Landpolizei (rural police), Dragoner, Husaren and other denominations | 19th century | mid-20th century | Due to the distinctive autonomy of the German states, every state has its own history of establishing and denomination. In Prussia for example it was called Royal Prussian State Gendarmerie |
| Greece | Hellenic Gendarmerie | Ελληνική Χωροφυλακή, Elliniki Chorofylaki | 1833 | 1984 | Merged with the City Police and formed the current Hellenic Police |
| Haiti | Gendarmerie of Haiti | | 1915 | 1928 | Established following a US intervention, later reorganized into Garde d'Haïti |
| Honduras | Gendarmerie of Honduras | Gendarmería de Honduras | 1866 | 1882 | |
| Hungary | Hungarian Royal Gendarmerie | Magyar Királyi Csendőrség | 1881 | 1945 | Until 1918 Gendarmerie of Transleithanian part of Austria-Hungary; disbanded by the Interim National Government after WWII because Hungarian Royal Gendarmerie took part in the Holocaust by gathering the Hungarian Jews and giving them to the Nazi German forces. |
| Hungary | Law Enforcement and Public Safety Service | Rendészeti Biztonsági Szolgálat | 2004 | 2008 | Couple years after the fall of the communist regime, a new gendarmerie-type police force within the frameworks of the Hungarian National Police:, Rendészeti Biztonsági Szolgálat was formed and existed between 2004 and 2008. |
| Iran | Islamic Republic of Iran Gendarmerie | ژاندارمری (Zhāndārmerī) | 1979 | 1990 | Persian Central Government Gendarmerie 1911–1921, Amniyeh Kol-e Mamlekati 1921–1943; GENMISH 1943–1957; State Gendarmerie 1957–1979; gendarmerie dissolved in 1990 |
| (Republic of Ireland) Ireland | Royal Irish Constabulary | | 1822 | 1922 | Royal added to the name in 1867. |
| (Kingdom of Italy) Italian East Africa | Italian African Police | Polizia dell'Africa Italiana | 1936 | 1941 | Operated throughout Italian East Africa |
| (Kingdom of Italy) Italian colonies of Italian East Africa, Italian Libya and Italian Somaliland | Zaptié | | 1889 | 1942 | |
| Japan | Corps of Law Soldiers (lit) | Kempeitai, 憲兵隊 | 1881 | 1945 | Part of the Imperial Japanese Army |
| Japan | Naval Secret Police | Tokkeitai, 特警隊 | | 1945 | The Imperial Japanese Navy's military police, they were equivalent to the Imperial Japanese Army's Kempeitai. They were also the smallest military police service. |
| Japan | National Police Reserve | 警察予備隊, Keisatsu Yobitai | 1950 | 1952 | National force in Japan until formation of JSDF and NPA. According to Article 3, National Police Reserve Order (警察予備隊令第三條), the NPR took action upon appointment by the Prime Minister when it was particularly necessary to maintain public security. |
| State of Katanga | Katangese Gendarmerie | | 1960 | 1963 | |
| Kazakhstan | Internal Troops of Kazakhstan | Қазақстан IIМ iшкi әскері, Qazaqstan IIM ishki áskeri | 1992 | 2014 | Reformed into National Guard of Kazakhstan |
| Luxembourg | Grand Ducal Gendarmerie | Gendarmerie Grand-Ducale | 1733 | 2000 | Dissolved under Nazi occupation from 1940 to 1944. Merged on 1 January 2000 with local Police to form the new Grand Ducal Police |
| Mexico | Rural Guard | Guardia Rural | 1861 | 1914 | In modern Mexico, the name is applied to the part-time Rural Defence Corps. |
| Mexico | National Gendarmerie | Gendarmeria Nacional | 1877 | 1970 | It was a body that has militarized police functions whose jurisdiction in large urban areas. |
| Mexico | Federal Police (Mexico) | Policía Federal | 2009 | 2019 | Reformed into the National Guard of Mexico |
| Portugal Mozambique (Portuguese Province) | Republican Guard of Lourenço Marques | Guarda Republicana de Lourenço Marques | 1913 | 1924 | Replaced both the former military Guarda Cívica (Civic Guard) and the Civil Police of Lourenço Marques. |
| Portugal Mozambique (Portuguese Province) | Police Guard of the Mozambique Company | Guarda Policial da Companhia de Moçambique | 1914 | 1925 | Military and police force of the territory under administration of the Mozambique Company (Territory of Manica and Sofala). Replaced by the Police Forces of the Mozambique Company (Forças Policiais da Companhia de Moçambique). |
| Nicaragua | National Guard (Nicaragua) | Guardia Nacional | 1925 | 1979 | |
| Northern Ireland, United Kingdom | Royal Ulster Constabulary | | 1922 | 2001 | Reformed into the civilian Police Service of Northern Ireland following the Good Friday Agreements |
| Ottoman Empire | Ottoman Gendarmerie | | 1869 | 1918 | Briefly split into forces serving the declining Ottoman regime and those working with the Ankara Government in the Turkish War of Independence. Reformed into the Gendarmerie General Command after the Abolition of the Ottoman Sultanate in 1923 without being disbanded. |
| Palestine (British Mandate) | British Gendarmerie | | 1920 | 1926 | Replaced by the Transjordan Frontier Force on 1 April |
| Peru | Peruvian Gendarmerie | Gendarmería Nacional del Perú | 1852 | 1924 | Became the basis of the Civil Guard. |
| Peru | Republican Guard | | 1919 | 1991 | |
| Philippines | Guardia Civil en las Filipinas | | 1868 | 1898 | The Guardia Civil en las Filipinas (Spanish) translated to the "Civil Guard in the Philippines" was the branch of the Civil Guard organised under the Spanish colonial government in the Philippines and a component of the Spanish Army. |
| Philippines | Philippine Constabulary | Hukbóng Pamayapà ng Pilipinas | 1901 | 1991 | Replaced the former Civil Guard as a gendarmerie law enforcement force. |
| Poland | Territorial Defense Forces | Obrona Terytorium Kraju | 1965 | 2008 | |
| Portugal | Fiscal Guard | Guarda Fiscal | 1885 | 1993 | It was military force controlled by the Portuguese Ministry of Finance, responsible for the tax and customs law enforcement and border surveillance. In 1993, it became part of the National Republican Guard, as the Fiscal Brigade. |
| (Portugal) Portuguese India | Police and Supervion Corps of India | Corpo de Polícia e Fiscalização da Índia | 1924 | 1946 | Transformed in the entirely civilian Polícia do Estado da Índia (State of India Police) in 1946. |
| Kingdom of Prussia | Royal Prussian State Gendarmerie | | 1812 | 1918 | |
| Rhodesia | British South Africa Police | | 1889 | 1980 | Part of the Rhodesian Security Forces. Also had specialist paramilitary units such as the Police Anti-Terrorist Unit and the Support Unit (known as the Blackboots) |
| Russia | Internal Troops of Russia | Внутренние войска МВД России | 1992 | 2016 | |
| Russian Empire | Special Corps of Gendarmes | Отдельный корпус жандармов | 1836 | 1917 | Part of the Russian Imperial Army under the 3rd Section until 1880, under the Police Department of Russia afterwards |
| United States Occupation Zone of West Germany and Austria | United States Constabulary | | 1946 | 1952 | |
| Kingdom of Saxony | Feldgendarmerie | | 1810 | 1812 | Military police units of the army of the kingdom of Saxony. |
| South Africa | South African Constabulary | | 1900 | 1908 | Used for policing the former territories of Transvaal and Orange Free State |
| South Africa | Natal Mounted Police | | 1874 | 1913 | |
| Soviet Union | Internal Troops | Внутренние войска МВД СССР | 1919 | 1991 | |
| Spain | Carabineros | | 1829 | 1940 | Border patrol and customs service of Spain until the end of the Spanish Civil War |
| Spain | National Republican Guard | Guardia Nacional Republicana | 1936 | 1937 | Created from the faction of Civil Guard loyal to the Republicans in the Spanish Civil War |
| Spanish Guinea | Colonial Guard of Spanish Guinea | | 1908 | 1968 | |
| Syria | Syrian Gendarmerie | | 1921 | 1958 | Formed by the French to combat local insurgencies, and maintained as late as 1958. |
| Thailand | Royal Siamese Provincial Gendarmerie | ตำรวจภูธร | 1897 | 1915 | Formed in 1897 by Danish mercenaries, integrated with the Royal Thai Police in 1915. |
| Ukraine | Free Cossacks | | 1917 | 1918 | |
| Ukraine | Internal Troops of Ukraine | Внутрішні війська МВС України | 1991 | 2014 | National Guard in 1992–2000, name reverted to 'Internal Troops' afterwards until the Euromaidan |
| United States Indian Territory | Lighthorse | ? | | | The name given by the Five Civilized Tribes of the United States to their mounted police force. The US Army's cavalry performed gendarme duties until the advent of law and order. |
| Vatican City | Corps of Gendarmerie of Vatican City | Corpo della Gendarmeria dello Stato della Città del Vaticano | 1816 | 1974 | Formed 1816. Replaced by a civilian Central Security Office, in 1970, which itself became the Corpo di Vigilanza dello Stato della Città del Vaticano in 1991. Was restored as the Gendarmerie in 2002. |

== See also ==
- List of law enforcement agencies
- List of border guards
- Gendarmerie (disambiguation)
- Military aid to the civil power
- Militarization of police
- Paramilitary
- Military police
- Police
- Carabinier
- Field Force
- National Guard (disambiguation)
- United States National Guard
- State Police (United States)
- Constabulary
- People's Armed Police
- International Association of Gendarmeries and Police Forces with Military Status
