= Gendarmerie (disambiguation) =

A gendarmerie is a police force that is generally part of the armed forces of a country, and is responsible for policing the civilian population (and usually the armed forces as well.)

Organisations whose names contain the word "gendarmerie" include:

- Argentine National Gendarmerie
- British Gendarmerie
- Chadian National Gendarmerie
- Chilean Gendarmerie
- Corps of Gendarmerie of San Marino
- Corps of Gendarmerie of Vatican City
- Cretan Gendarmerie
- Djiboutian National Gendarmerie
- European Gendarmerie Force
- Feldgendarmerie
- Gendarmerie (Austria)
- Gendarmerie (Belgium)
- Gendarmerie (Bulgaria)
- Gendarmerie of Haiti
- Gendarmerie (Romania)
- Gendarmerie (Switzerland)
- Gendarmerie (Turkey)
- Gendarmerie Nationale (Benin)
- Gendarmerie Nationale (Cameroon)
- Gendarmerie Nationale (France)
  - Air Gendarmerie
  - Air Transport Gendarmerie
  - Departmental Gendarmerie
  - Maritime Gendarmerie
  - Mobile Gendarmerie
- Gendarmerie Nationale (Gabon)
- Gendarmerie Nationale (Madagascar)
- Gendarmerie Nationale (Mali)
- Gendarmerie Nationale (Mauritania)
- Gendarmerie Nationale (Niger)
- Gendarmerie Nationale (Rwanda)
- Gendarmerie Nationale (Senegal)
- Gendarmerie Nationale Togolaise
- Gendarmerie (Republika Srpska)
- Gendarmerie (Romania)
- Gendarmery (Serbia)
- Grand Ducal Gendarmerie (Luxembourg)
- Grand Duchy of Baden Gendarmerie
- Hellenic Gendarmerie
- Imperial-Royal Gendarmerie
- International Gendarmerie
- Iranian Gendarmerie
- Military Gendarmerie (Poland)
- National Gendarmerie (Burkina Faso)
- Ottoman Gendarmerie
- Peruvian Gendarmerie
- Royal Albanian Gendarmerie
- Gendarmerie royale du Canada, the French name of the Royal Canadian Mounted Police
- Royal Hungarian Gendarmerie
- Royal Moroccan Gendarmerie
- Royal Gendarmerie of Cambodia
- Russian Gendarmerie

== See also ==
- Corpo della Gendarmeria
- Corps of Gendarmes
- Gendarmeria
- Gendarmerie Nationale
