= Gendarmerie Nationale =

Gendarmerie Nationale most commonly refers to:

- Gendarmerie Nationale (France)
- Gendarmerie Nationale (Belgium), merged with Belgian police in 2001

Gendarmerie Nationale may also refer to:

- Gendarmerie Nationale (Algeria)
- Gendarmerie Nationale (Benin)
- Gendarmerie Nationale (Burkina-Faso)
- Gendarmerie Nationale (Burundi)
- Gendarmerie Nationale (Cameroon)
- Gendarmerie Nationale (Chad)
- Gendarmerie Nationale (Gabon)
- Gendarmerie Nationale (Madagascar)
- Gendarmerie Nationale (Mali)
- Gendarmerie Nationale (Mauritania)
- Gendarmerie Nationale (Niger)
- Gendarmerie Nationale (Rwanda) (defunct; merged into the Rwanda National Police)
- Gendarmerie Nationale (Senegal)
- Gendarmerie Nationale (Togo)

== See also ==
- Corpo della Gendarmeria
- Corps of Gendarmes
- Gendarmeria
- Gendarmerie (disambiguation)
