= Corps of Gendarmes =

Corps of Gendarmes may refer to:

- Grand Duchy of Baden's Gendarmerie Corps
- Cuerpo de Gendarmería de Prisiones, the old title for the Chilean Gendarmerie
- Special Corps of Gendarmes of the Russian Empire
- Corps of Gendarmerie of San Marino
- Corps of Gendarmerie of Vatican City

== See also ==
- Corpo della Gendarmeria
- Gendarmeria
- Gendarmerie (disambiguation)
- Gendarmerie Nationale
