= National Police =

National Police may refer to the national police forces of numerous countries:

- Afghanistan: Afghan National Police
- Angola: Angola National Police
- Bolivia: National Police Corps
- Bulgaria: National Police Service (Bulgaria)
- Burkina Faso: National Police of Burkina Faso
- Burundi: National Police of Burundi
- Cambodia: Cambodian National Police
- Cape Verde: National Police of Cape Verde
- Central African Republic: National Police of the Central African Republic
- Chad: National Police of Chad
- Colombia: National Police of Colombia
- Congo, Democratic Republic of the: Congolese National Police
- Congo, Republic of the: Congolese National Police
- Cuba: National Revolutionary Police Force
- Djibouti: Djibouti National Police
- Dominican Republic: Dominican Republic National Police
- Ecuador: National Police of Ecuador
- Egypt: Egyptian National Police
- El Salvador: National Civil Police (El Salvador)
- France: National Police (France)
- Guatemala: National Civil Police (Guatemala)
- Haiti: Haitian National Police
- Honduras: National Police of Honduras
- Indonesia: Indonesian National Police
- Japan:
  - National Police Reserve, 1950–1954
  - National Police Agency (Japan), 1954–present
- Liberia: Liberian National Police
- Liechtenstein: National Police (Liechtenstein)
- Madagascar: Malagasy National Police
- Mali: National Police of Mali
- Mongolia: National Police Agency (Mongolia)
- The Netherlands: National Police Corps (Netherlands)
- Nicaragua: National Police of Nicaragua
- Niger: National Police of Niger
- Pakistan Federal Constabulary
- Panama: National Police of Panama
- Paraguay: National Police of Paraguay
- Peru: National Police of Peru
- Philippines
  - Integrated National Police, 1975–1991
  - Philippine National Police, 1991–present
- Rwanda: Rwanda National Police
- Slovenia: Slovenian National Police Force
- South Korea: National Police Agency (South Korea)
- South Vietnam: Republic of Vietnam National Police
- Spain: National Police Corps (Spain)
- Taiwan: National Police Agency (Taiwan)
- Timor-Leste: National Police of Timor-Leste
- Togo: Togolese National Police
- Ukraine: National Police of Ukraine
- Uruguay: National Police of Uruguay
- Venezuela: Bolivarian National Police
