= Law enforcement in Hungary =

Emblem of the Police

Law enforcement in Hungary is split among the Police and Border Guards, and the Customs and Excise Authority. Since 2006, the Police has been subject to the Ministry of Justice, when the Ministry of Interior was re-structured to deal with Municipalities and Regional Development. Due to Hungary's accession to the Schengen Treaty, the Police and Border Guards were merged into a single national corps, with the Border Guards becoming Police Officers. This merger took place in January 2008. The Customs and Excise Authority remained to be subject to the Ministry of Finance.

The national police headquarters is located in Budapest, 13th District. It is nicknamed as Police Palace. In February, 2007, the headquarters was the target of small arms fire, with multiple bullet holes being found in the building, but there were no injuries.

== Rendőrség (Police) ==
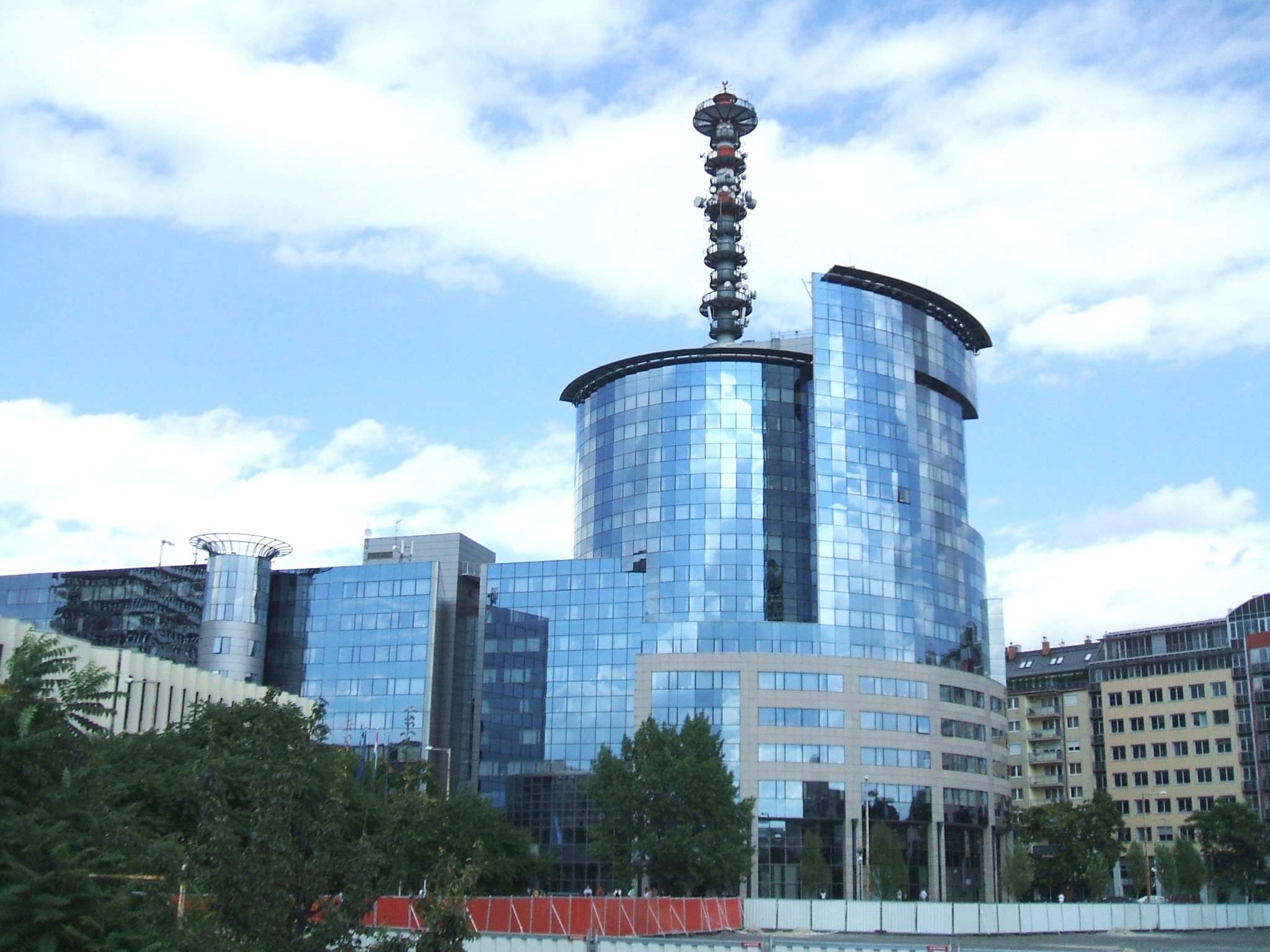
National Police HQ in Budapest

The Hungarian Police is the main and largest governmental law enforcement agency in Hungary. It reports to the Ministry of the Interior and is headed by the National Commissioner of the Police (országos rendőrfőkapitány). It carries out general policing, patrolling, traffic policing, border control and criminal investigations. It is divided into twenty regional units: one for the capital city Budapest and nineteen for the nineteen counties of Hungary. Among the capital and county departments there are two other units with nationwide jurisdiction: the National Bureau of Investigation (Nemzeti_Nyomozó_Iroda) for fighting serious crimes, and the highly militarized Riot Police (Készenléti_Rendőrség) for strengthening local police forces and perform SWAT operations.

== Terrorelhárítási Központ (Counter Terrorism Centre) ==
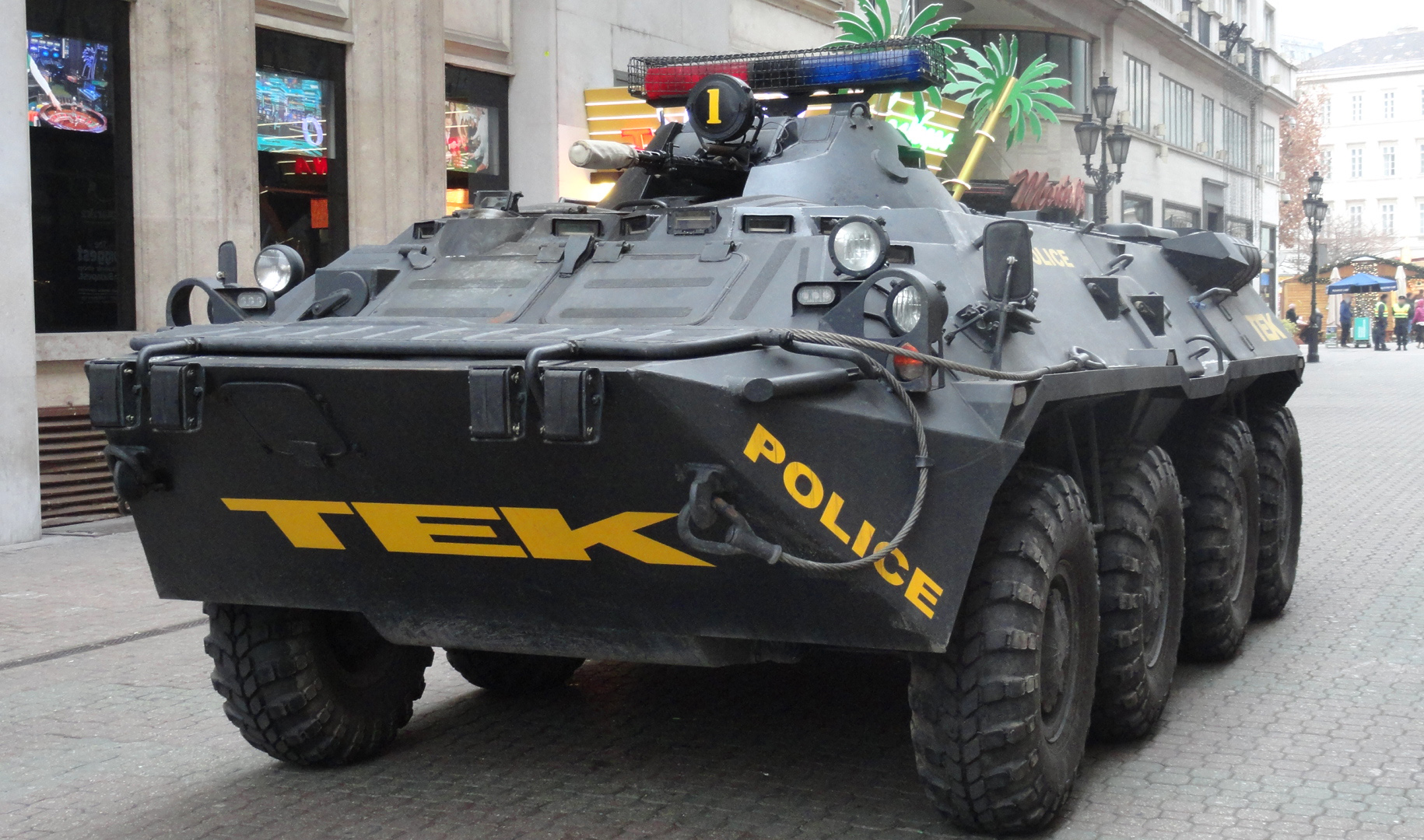
TEK armored vehicle

The Counter Terrorism Centre is a special police force with nationwide jurisdiction under the direct control of the Minister of the Interior of Hungary, founded by prime minister Viktor Orbán in 2011. It mainly deals with counter-terrorist activities, the majority of the police officers serving in the body are trained as SWAT officers to fight against armed criminals. They interfere when necessary in any case if asked for by the National Police or other authorities. Besides, the Counter Terrorism Centre is also responsible for the protection of the Hungarian prime minister, the Hungarian president, other high-ranking government, state officials and the security of several government buildings, and also serves as a secret service-like organisation, collecting and analysing information about potentially dangerous groups and people. It is often criticised by the political opposition as "the private army of the prime minister", since its first and current director, police brigadier general János Hajdú was earlier the personal bodyguard of prime minister Viktor Orbán after retiring from his police career. Nevertheless, it is a fact that the officers employed and the functions carried out by the service existed earlier mainly within the frameworks of the National Police under the name of "Terrorelhárító Szolgálat" (Counter Terrorism Service), they were only centralised into an autonomous police force under the direct control of the Ministry of the Interior, not causing essential changes in the structure and operation of Hungarian law enforcement, only the organisational frameworks changed to some extent.

== Nemzeti Védelmi Szolgálat (National Protective Service) ==
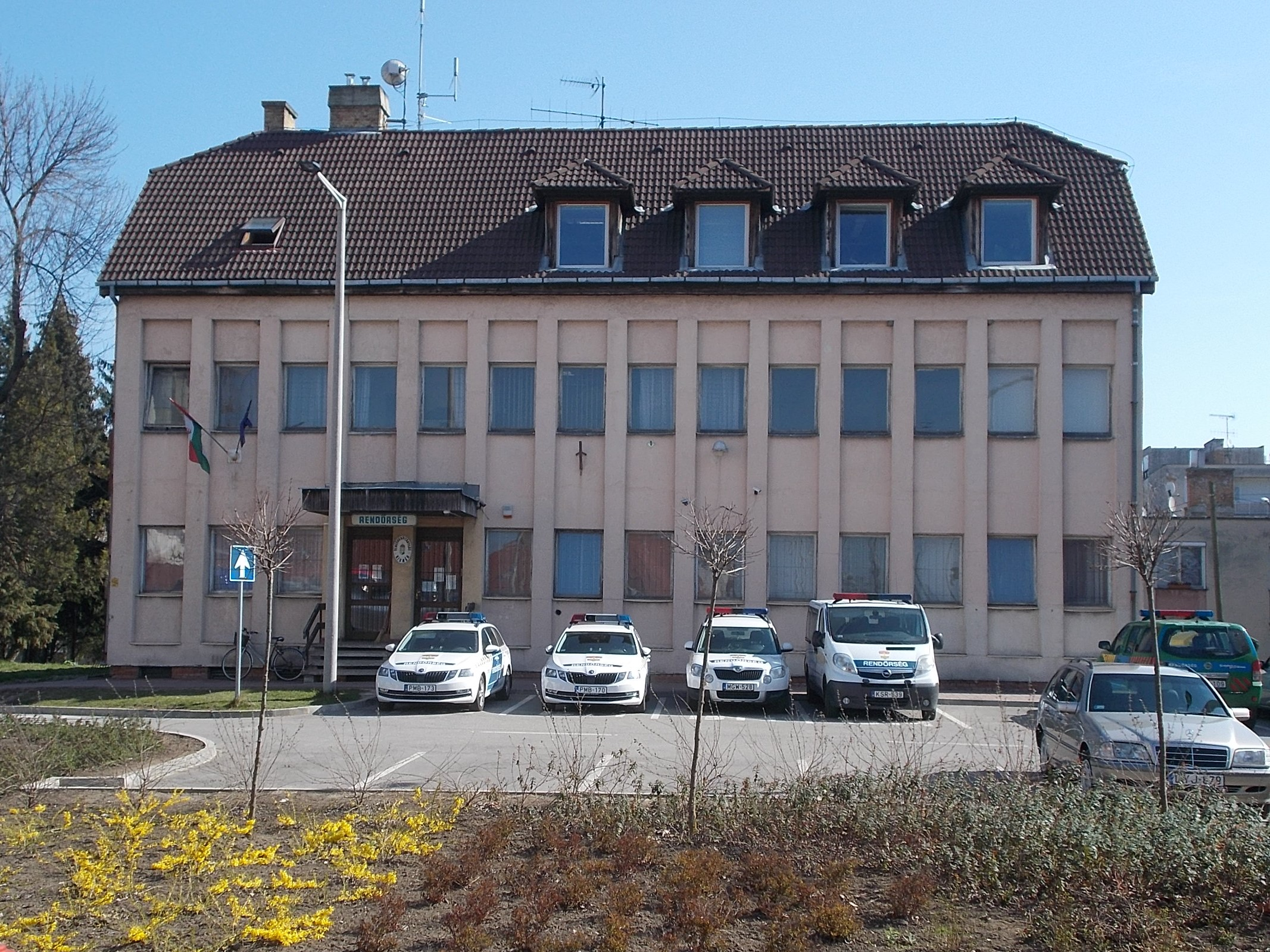
Police station in the town of Kisbér

The National Protective Service is a special police force under the direct control of the Minister of the Interior, with nationwide jurisdiction, mainly dealing with anti-corruption activities within the government sphere. The service can collect information about any government officials, including their private life or law enforcement officers in Hungary, even testing their reliability by making a false attempt to bribe them. Although the force is also often criticised by the media of the political opposition as "resembling the secret police services of the era of the communistic dictatorship", it should be mentioned that similar anti-corruption organisation exist in nearly all member states of the European Union, and its preceding agency the Rendészeti Szervek Védelmi Szolgálata (Protective Service of Law Enforcement Agencies) had nearly the same jurisdiction over the uniformed officers employed by the government, its jurisdiction was only extended to the civilian officials employed by ministries and other government organs, and considering the high rates of corruption in Hungary, the existence operation of the service seems to be necessary. Since the service was established, the corruption within the public sphere in Hungary including law enforcement agencies decreased to some extent. Up to now it has not been proven that the National Protective Service would have abused its powers granted by law in any way. The National Protection Service has established its own code of conduct, and regulations concerning the declaration of property that apply to the police also apply to the National Protective Service.

== Nemzetbiztonsági Szakszolgálat (National Security Service) ==
The National Security Service is one of the civilian secret services of Hungary under the direct control of the Minister of the Interior. It is a background organisation that provides the technical equipment to collect information about or to intercept someone if ordered by the Police, a court judge, the Public Prosecutor's Office or other authorities. The service rather fights against organised crime than dealing with counter-espionage nowadays, and its jurisdictions are strictly regulated by law.

== Alkotmányvédelmi Hivatal (Constitution Protection Office) ==
The Constitution Protection Agency is the main internal civilian secret service of Hungary under the control of the Minister of the Interior. Although originally it is a domestic intelligence and counter-intelligence agency, since espionage activity is rare in Hungary and in the region, as a law enforcement agency it rather focuses on organised crime and potentially dangerous, political extremist persons and groups, strongly co-operating with the Police and other law enforcement agencies. The officers of the agency are allowed to carry firearms, but can use it only for self-defence or for the defence of others, and can perform arrests or other police measures only in the presence of uniformed police officers, their activity is in essence limited to the collection of information.

== Municipal police services ==
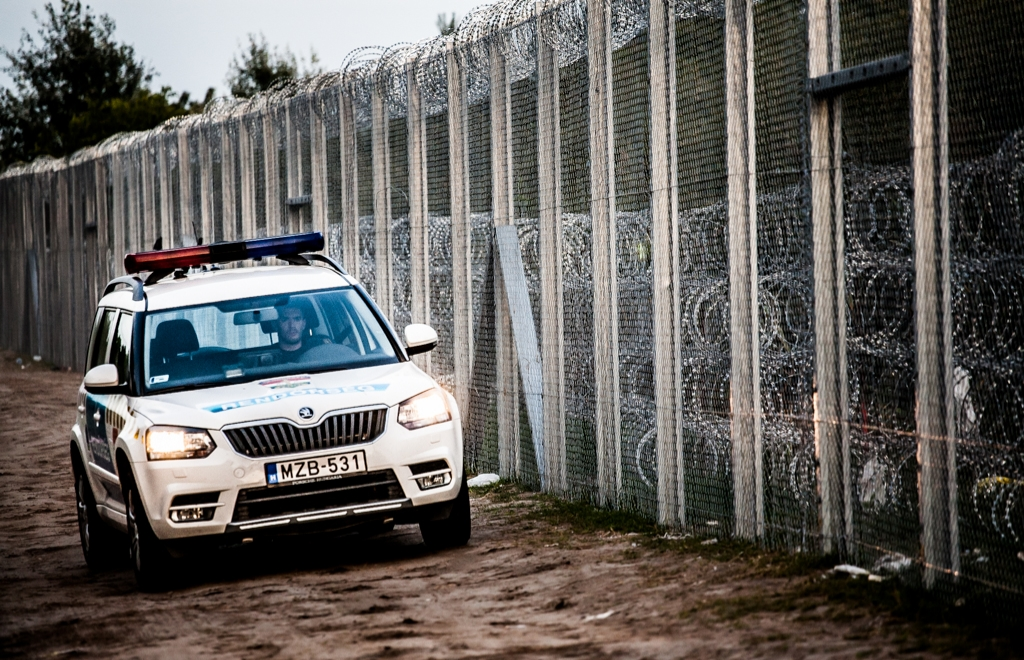
Police SUV at the Hungarian border to Serbia

In Hungary there are also municipal / local police forces with very limited jurisdictions. Its officers are employed by the local government, but their jurisdiction and activities are defined and controlled by the Minister of the Interior and the local state police forces, strictly co-operating with them. The most widespread form of local police organisations is the "Közterület-felügyelet" (usually translated as Public Space Supervision Authority) which can be found in the capital and larger towns in the country. Public Space Supervision officers usually wear blue uniforms similar to that of the National Police, and by law they are qualified as police officers and in principle they can perform arrests and other police measures, but practically they are unarmed, and their activity is usually limited to crime prevention and fining the perpetrators of minor offences. If they recognise some serious crime, they are to call the National Police. According to the new regulation of 2013, local governments in Hungary can also establish so-called "Önkormányzati Rendészet" (Local Government Police) with a more extended jurisdiction than Public Space Supervision Authorities, and potentially the police officers of such services can be armed, but can wear and use their firearms only under very strict regulations. Many local government also employs so-called "Mezőőrség" (Rural Police, Ranger Service) in order to defend rural areas and infields. Local government rural police officers are usually armed with shotguns as qualified hunters, but can use their firearms only for self-defence and if they recognise any serious crimes are to call the National Police, but can levy fines and impede perpetrators until the arrival of the National Police.

== Historical secret and other police organizations ==
- Államvédelmi Osztály (ÁVO) (State Protection Department)
- Államvédelmi Hatóság (ÁVH) (State Protection Authority)
- Csendőrség (Gendarmes)

== See also ==
- Crime in Hungary
- Law Enforcement and Public Safety Service
- Police of Hungary
