= Jocelyn Percy =

British Army general

Major-General Sir Jocelyn Percy KBE CB CMG DSO
- Born: 9 March 1871; Gibraltar
- Died: 26 August 1952 (aged 81)
- Military career
- Allegiance: United Kingdom
- Branch: British Army
- Service years: 1891–1919
- Rank: Major-General
- Conflicts: Chitral Expedition; Second Boer War; First World War
- Awards: Knight Commander of the Order of the British Empire; Companion of the Order of the Bath; Companion of the Order of St Michael and St George; Distinguished Service Order; Mentioned in Despatches

Major-General Sir John Samuel Jocelyn Percy, KBE, CB, CMG, DSO (9 March 1871 – 25 August 1952) was a British Army officer and Inspector General of the Royal Albanian Gendarmerie.

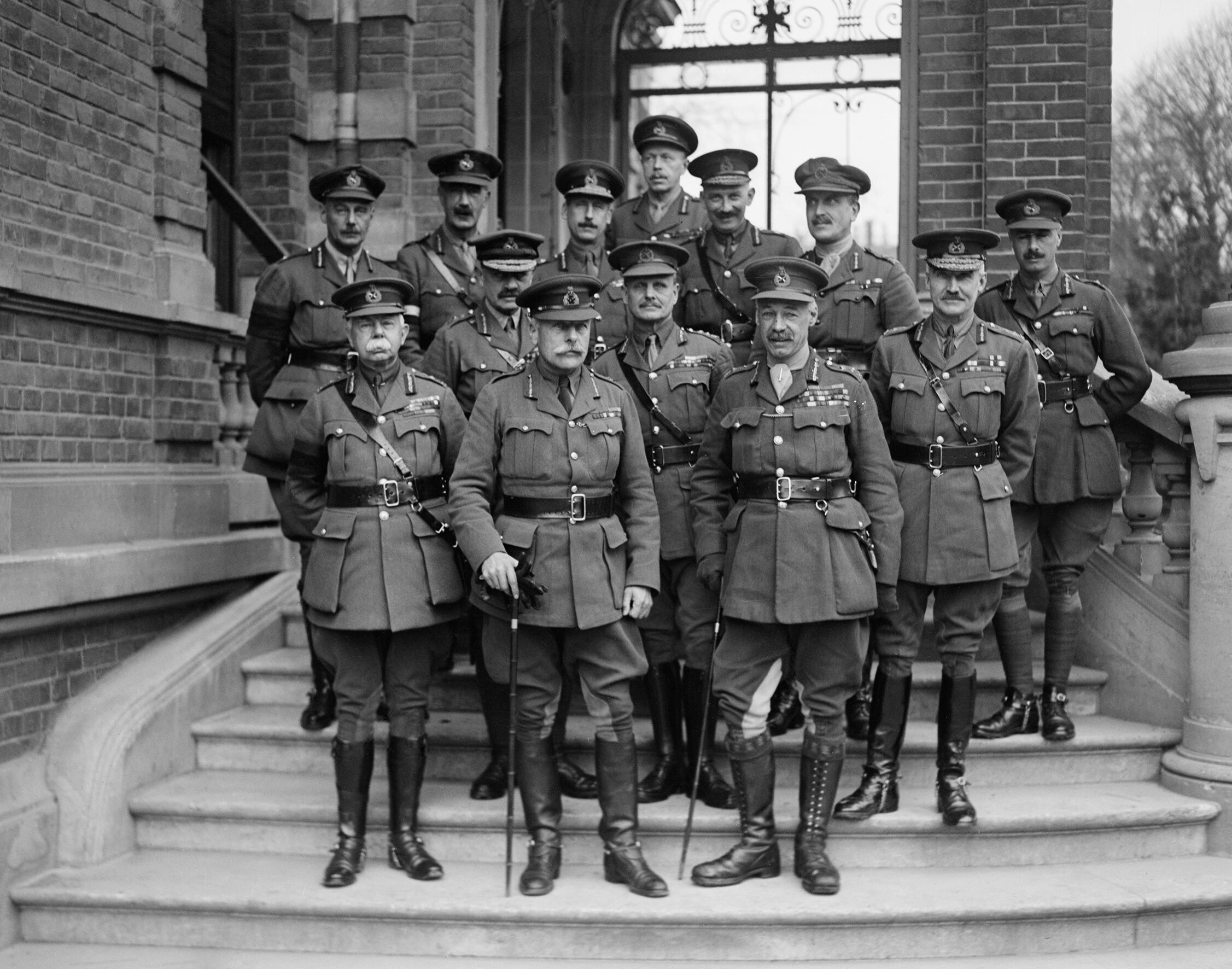
Sir Douglas Haig with his army commanders and their chiefs of staff, November 1918. Front row, left to right: Sir Herbert Plumer, Sir Douglas Haig, Sir Henry Rawlinson. Middle row, left to right: Sir Julian Byng, Sir William Birdwood, Sir Henry Horne. Back row, left to right: Sir Herbert Lawrence, Sir Charles Kavanagh, Brudenell White, Jocelyn Percy, Louis Vaughan, Archibald Montgomery-Massingberd, Hastings Anderson.

Percy was born in Gibraltar, the child of Edward Joscelyn Baumgartner (1815–1899), barrister and registrar of the Supreme Court of Gibraltar. The family later changed its name to Percy during the First World War, after the House of Percy to whom they were distantly related. He returned to England in 1884, and was educated at Queen Elizabeth's Grammar School in Sevenoaks and the Royal Military College, Sandhurst. He was commissioned into the East Lancashire Regiment in 1891.

After service in Ireland, Percy was posted to India and served in the 1894 Waziristan campaign and the 1895 Chitral Expedition. During the Second Boer War, he served in Robert's Horse. At Sanna's Post in 1900, he had his horse killed under him. He was mentioned in despatches twice and promoted to brevet major.

During the First World War, Percy served in a number of staff positions, with the 27th, 48th, and 31st Divisions. Later, he was on the staff of the 11th Corps, the Fifth Army under General Sir Hubert Gough, and the Second Army under General Sir Herbert Plumer.

For his wartime service, Percy, promoted to substantive colonel in June 1919, was appointed a Companion of the Order of the Bath and a Companion of the Order of St Michael and St George, awarded the Distinguished Service Order, mentioned in despatches six times, was appointed a Commander of the French Legion of Honour, of the Order of Leopold of Belgium, and of the Order of the Star of Romania, and received the Belgian Croix de guerre and the Order of the Sacred Treasure of Japan.
