= Gendarmeria =

- Corpo della Gendarmeria della Repubblica di San Marino
- Corpo della Gendarmeria dello Stato della Città del Vaticano
- Gendarmería Nacional Argentina

== See also ==
- Corpo della Gendarmeria
- Corps of Gendarmes
- Gendarmerie (disambiguation)
- Gendarmerie Nationale
