= Law Enforcement and Public Safety Service =

Law Enforcement and Public Safety Service (Hungarian "Rendészeti Biztonsági Szolgálat") is a part of the Hungarian National Police which is very similar to Western-European Gendarmerie-type police forces.

== Character ==
The abbreviation of the organisation is REBISZ or RBSZ.

It is an independent within the framework of the National Police of the Republic of Hungary, subordinated to the Ministry of Justice and Law Enforcement, formerly to the Ministry of the Interior.

It has no connection with the Volunteer Army of Hungary, unlike certain police forces in Europe called gendarmerie, although its members are trained in a military way, and it must be mentioned that the Hungarian Police itself is organised according to military principles; for example, policemen and detectives have military ranks.

== Duties ==
The RBSZ is a kind of special police force that supports traditional police forces very often. It was created with the integration of four formerly independent police forces (Mounted Squads of the Budapest Police Department, State Highway Patrol, Riot Police, and Special Messenger Service). Therefore, control of state highways, riot police assignments and messenger assignments between police services belong to the sphere of authority of RBSZ, but its sphere of authority is much wider.

The members of the organisation often patrol together with the members of local police forces, mainly in Budapest, capital city of Hungary. Furthermore, RBSZ-policemen guard the main government buildings and airports. Other than this, the police force has several counter-terrorist squads. The uniform of the RBSZ is often different from that of traditional Hungarian policemen; they are much more soldier-like, therefore they can often be recognised. However, regulation is not so strict, which is why one might see RBSZ-policemen in traditional uniforms; for example wearing baseball hats, in which they are less soldier-like.

It must be mentioned that although RBSZ are the police force in Hungary that is similar to Western-European gendarmeries, there is a special police force in Hungary, the independent Border Guard Service (also subordinated to the Ministry of Justice), that has squads the members of which are trained as soldiers and in case of war they get subordinated to the Army and the Ministry of Defence. That is why many say that Hungarian Border Guard Service is more similar to gendarmerie-type police forces than RBSZ, but it is true only regarding the military duties of Hungarian Border Guards.

== See also ==
- Law enforcement in Hungary
- Crime in Hungary
