= TAKM =

Eurasian military-status law enforcement organization.

TAKM Organization of the Eurasian Law Enforcement Agencies with Military Status
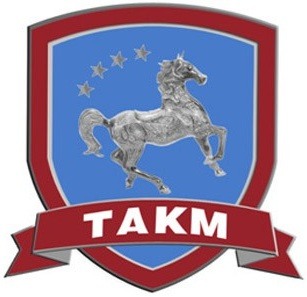
- Emblem of TAKM

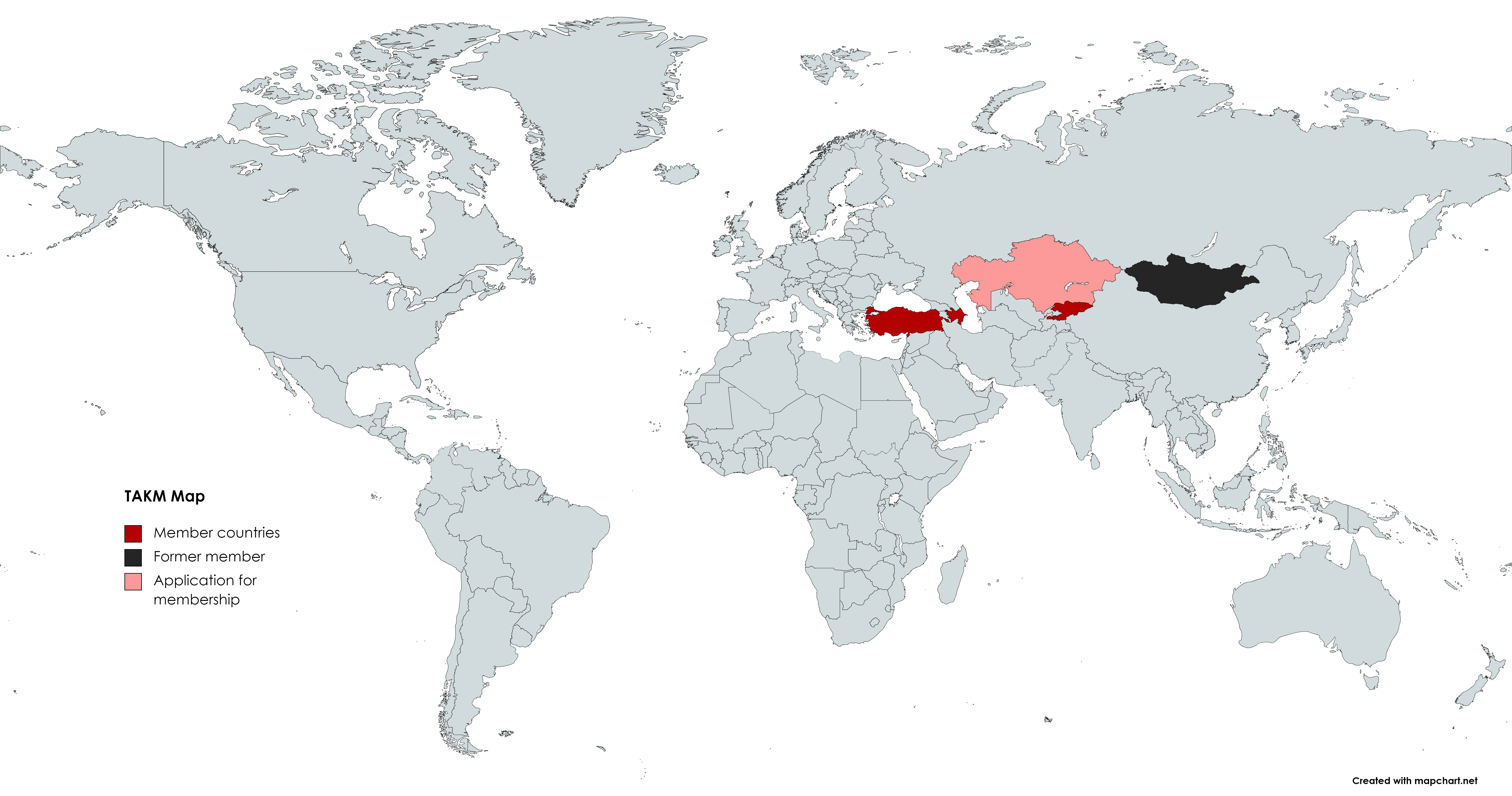
- Formation: 25 January 2013
- Type: Law enforcement co-operation organization (Gendarmerie)
- Headquarters: Ankara, Turkey
- Members: Turkey; Azerbaijan; Kyrgyzstan; Former members:Mongolia
- Term president: Gen. Servet YÖRÜK (Turkish Gendarmerie)

The TAKM, or Organization of the Eurasian Law Enforcement Agencies with Military Status (Turkish: Avrasya Askerî Statülü Kolluk Kuvvetleri Teşkilatı, is an intergovernmental military law enforcement (gendarmerie) organization of three Turkic countries (Turkey, Azerbaijan, Kyrgyzstan) and, formerly, Mongolia. The initialism TAKM came from the founder countries' names.

The TAKM is considered as an alternative for the FIEP.

== Member states ==
In 2014, Mongolia refused to sign the foundation agreement and quit the organization, while Kazakhstan applied for membership, which led to the decision to reestablish the organisation on a new basis.

Date	Country	
25 January 2013	Turkey Gendarmerie General Command	Founders
25 January 2013	Azerbaijan Internal Troops	Founders
25 January 2013	Kyrgyzstan Internal Troops	Founders
25 January 2013	Mongolia Internal Troops	
