= Corpo della Gendarmeria =

Corpo della Gendarmeria may refer to:

- Corpo della Gendarmeria della Repubblica di San Marino
- Corpo della Gendarmeria dello Stato della Città del Vaticano

== See also ==
- Corps of Gendarmes
- Gendarmeria
- Gendarmerie (disambiguation)
- Gendarmerie Nationale
