= International Association of Gendarmeries and Police Forces with Military Status =

International police organization

The FIEP logo

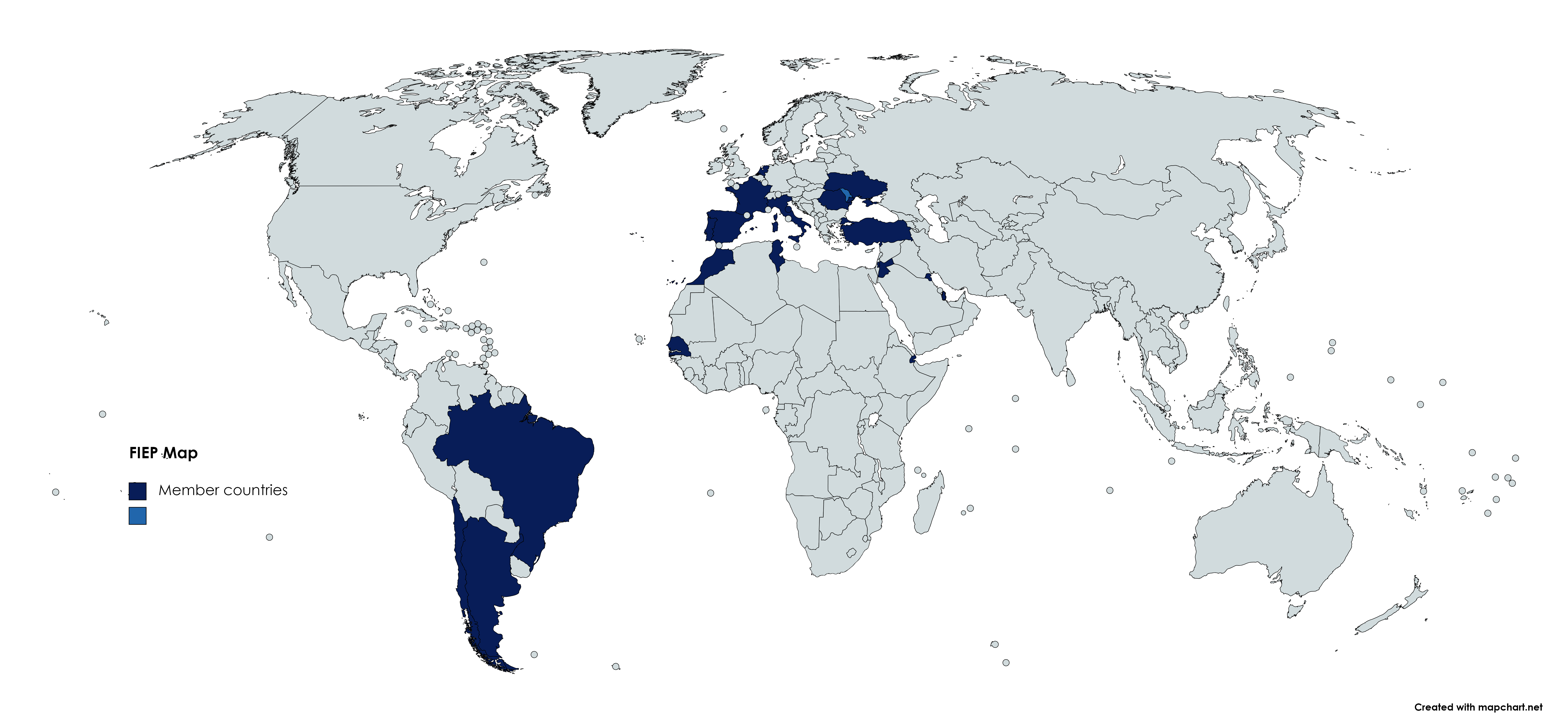
International Association of Gendarmeries and Police Forces with Military Status

The International Association of Gendarmeries and Police Forces with Military Status (commonly known as FIEP) is an international association of police forces with military status operating under the gendarmerie model. Founded in 1994 by France, Italy, and Spain and named in 1996 after Portugal joined, it serves as a forum for cooperation and exchange of experience among its members and is limited to forces with military status that conduct policing missions under judicial authority and public order operations under civilian control.

== History ==
The FIEP was founded in 1994, when the military status internal security forces of France, Italy, and Spain met to address shared challenges related to crime, public order, and the coexistence of police and gendarmerie models. Two years later, in 1996, the National Republican Guard of Portugal joined the initiative. With the accession of Portugal, the association became known as FIEP, an acronym derived from France, Italia, España (Spain), and Portugal.

The founding agreement adopted in 1994 was open to other gendarmerie forces. Although the possibility of creating a European gendarmerie was discussed, the association did not evolve into an operational force and remained an organization dedicated to the exchange of experience between its members.

Over time, additional gendarmerie forces joined the association. These included Turkey in 1998, the Netherlands and Morocco in 1999, and Romania in 2002. Argentina and Chile joined in 2005, followed by Jordan in 2011. Further accessions included Qatar in 2013, Tunisia and Brazil in 2016, Palestine and Ukraine in 2017, Djibouti in 2018, Kuwait and Senegal in 2019, San Marino in 2022, and Moldova in 2023.

== Structure ==
The FIEP is organized under a statutory framework and is structured around three main bodies: the Senior Council, a rotating Presidency assisted by a Secretariat, and a system of four commissions. The Senior Council is composed of the Directors or Commanders General of all member forces and serves as the association's principal decision making body. It meets annually, usually in October, and adopts decisions by unanimity, which are formalized through a common declaration.

The Presidency is held on a rotating basis by one member force for a one year term and is responsible for representing the association and coordinating its activities, assisted by a Secretariat based within the headquarters of the presiding force. The work of the association is carried out through four commissions covering human resources, organization of services, new technologies and logistics, and international affairs. These commissions meet regularly and function as forums for coordination and exchange among member forces. These bodies provide a structured framework for cooperation and exchange among member forces.

== Members ==
The members of the FIEP are national gendarmerie and police forces with military status rather than states, exercising executive powers under public authority and remaining subordinate to national legal and command frameworks. The association distinguishes between observer members, who may participate without voting rights, and full members, who participate with voting rights. Admission follows a multi stage procedure that includes evaluation and a period of observation, with decisions taken by unanimity within the Senior Council.

As of 2025, there are 21 members as follows:

State	Institution	Joined
France	National Gendarmerie	1994
Italy	Carabinieri	1994
Spain	Civil Guard	1994
Portugal	National Republican Guard	1996
Turkey	Gendarmerie General Command	1998
Netherlands	Royal Marechaussee	1999
Morocco	Royal Gendarmerie	1999
Romania	Gendarmerie	2002
Argentina	National Gendarmerie	2005
Chile	Carabineros	2005
Jordan	General Directorate of Gendarmerie	2011
Qatar	Lekhwiya	2013
Tunisia	National Guard	2016
Brazil	National Council of the General Commanders of the Military Police and Military Firefighters Corps	2016
Palestine	National Security Forces	2017
Ukraine	National Guard	2017
Djibouti	National Gendarmerie	2018
Kuwait	National Guard	2019
Senegal	National Gendarmerie	2019
San Marino	Corps of Gendarmerie	2022
Moldova	General Inspectorate of Carabinieri	2023

== See also ==
- European Gendarmerie Force
- Organization of the Eurasian Law Enforcement Agencies with Military Status
