= Crime in Hungary =

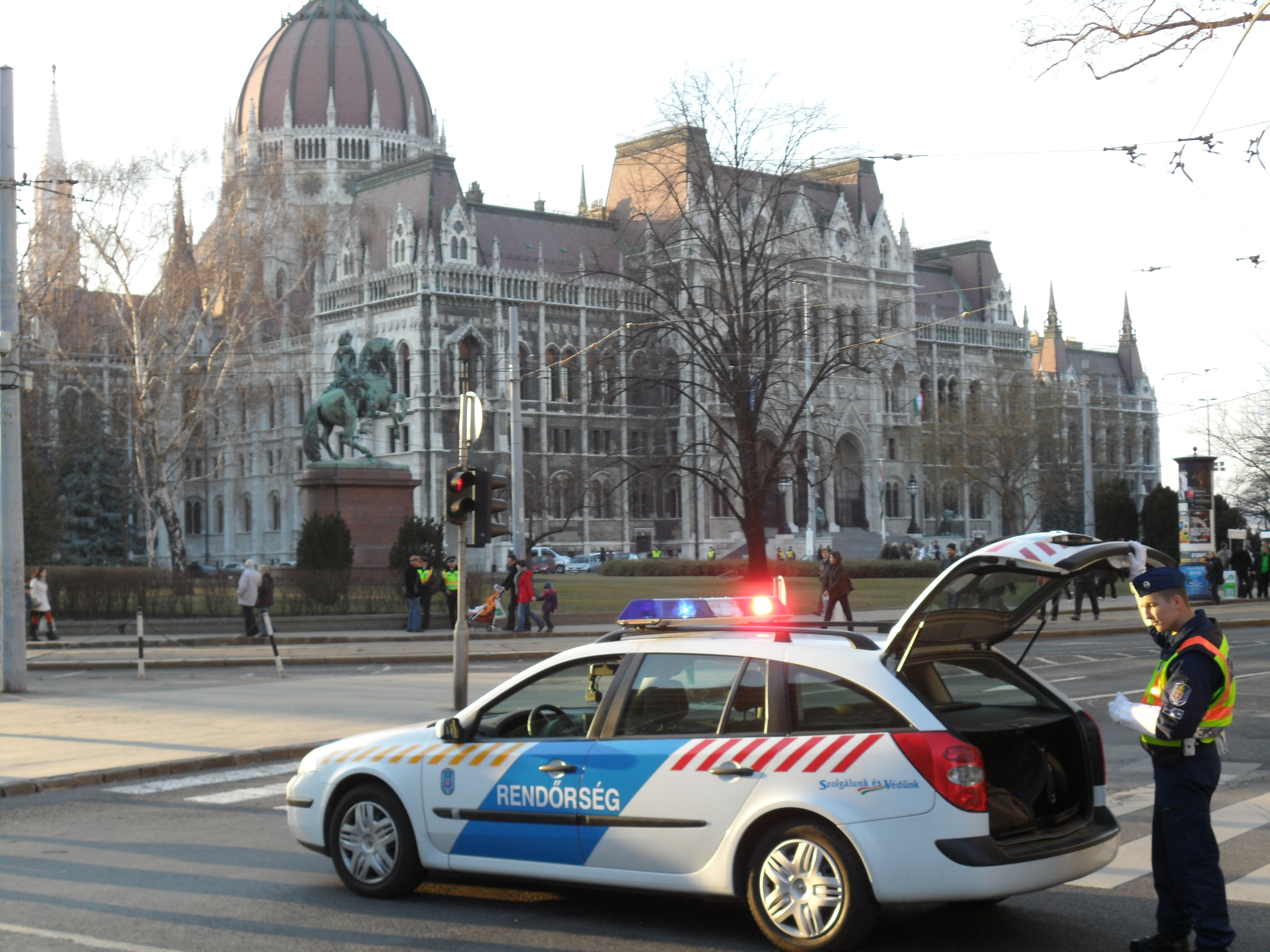
Hungarian police in Budapest

Crime in Hungary is combated by the Hungarian police and other agencies.

Between 2010 and 2021, the total number of registered crimes in Hungary fell from approx. 447,000 per year to 154,000.

== By type ==
=== Corruption ===
Hungary has long been described by human rights organisations as one of the most corrupt countries in the European Union.

Transparency International's 2024 Corruption Perceptions Index scored corruption in Hungary as the highest of any European Union member state. Referring to Hungary's 2023 score of 42, Transparency International wrote, "Over a decade of systemic breach of the rule of law in Hungary (42) has created a system where high-level corruption thrives unsanctioned. The rule of law reforms, coupled with a recent legislative initiative to silence remaining critics, reveal the government’s commitment to protect the status quo." In 2021, a European Commission report expressed frustration at Hungary's lack of progress in fighting corruption: "Risks of clientelism, favouritism and nepotism in high-level public administration, as well as risks arising from the link between businesses and political actors, remain unaddressed." In 2019, Freedom House downgraded Hungary's status from Free to Partly Free "due to sustained attacks on the country's democratic institutions by Prime Minister Viktor Orbán's Fidesz party, which has used its parliamentary supermajority to impose restrictions on or assert control over the opposition, the media, religious groups, academia, NGOs, the courts, asylum seekers, and the private sector since 2010". This was the first time a member of the European Union was designated as Partly Free. In response the Hungarian government stated that "Freedom House is a member of the Soros-empire, is funded by Soros, and is now supporting Soros's electoral campaign. They are attacking Hungary with other Soros-organisations because the Hungarians have decided that they do not want their country to become a migrant haven."

Transparency International's 2024 Corruption Perceptions Index, which scores 180 countries on a scale from 0 ("highly corrupt") to 100 ("very clean"), shows that Hungary's score has decreased by 14 points over the thirteen years since the current scoring system was implemented in 2012. The 2024 Index scored Hungary at 41. When ranked by score, Hungary ranked 82nd among the countries in the Index, where the country ranked first is perceived to have the most honest public sector. For comparison with regional scores, the highest score among Western European and European Union countries (Note: Austria, Belgium, Bulgaria, Croatia, Cyprus, Czech Republic, Denmark, Estonia, Finland, France, Germany, Greece, Hungary, Iceland, Ireland, Italy, Latvia, Lithuania, Luxembourg, Malta, Netherlands, Norway, Poland, Portugal, Romania, Slovakia, Slovenia, Spain, Sweden, Switzerland, and the United Kingdom) was 90, the average score was 64 and the lowest score was Hungary's, 41. For comparison with worldwide scores, the best score was 90 (ranked 1), the average score was 43, and the worst score was 8 (ranked 180).

=== Murder ===
In 2019, Hungary had 60 intentional homicides at a rate of 0.61 per 100,000 according to the office of the prosecutor general. In 2020, the homicide rate was 0.83 per 100,000. Overall, for over last 150 years, violence in Hungary decreased dramatically. The homicide rate in Hungary dropped from 7.4 per 100,000 people between 1850 and 1899, to 5.3 between 1900 and 1949, and to 2.5 between 1950 and 1999. The average rate from 2000 to 2021 was 1.7. However, this general trend went through a number of temporary violence booms. Three major waves of violence stand out since 1850: the first and largest peak occurred in the mid-1880s; a dramatic surge occurred in 1919; and another occurred in 1946. Smaller increases in murders also occurred in Hungary in 1904–1910, 1957 and the early 1990s. Each of these homicide peaks coincided with periods of political tension or instability.

Historical homicide statistics reveal significant regional disparities in lethal violence in Hungary (within the 1920 Trianon borders), with the counties in the North-East as having higher rates of violence; and the counties in the South-West as having lower violence. In 1865, statisticians recorded the highest homicide rate in Abaúj (43.7 per 100,000 inhabitants) and in Zemplén (18.4 per 100K) counties. The lowest rates of 1865 Hungary were recorded in Moson (0), Veszprém (0.6), Vas (1.2) and Tolna (1.4) counties. Similar geographical patterns existed in 1901–1910: the highest homicide rates concentrated in north-eastern counties such as Borsod, Abaúj-Torna, Zemplén and Bihar, and comparatively low rates recorded in western counties including Zala, Moson and Veszprém. Regional differences are also evident in more recent statistics. OECD regional data for 2021 report homicide rates of 0.3 in the Western and Southern Transdanubia regions (HU22 and HU23), compared to 1.4 in Northern Hungary (HU32).

Between 2008–2013, there were an average of 4,000 crimes against every 100,000 members of the population, of which at least 50% were considered serious crimes. As of 2017 the number of crimes had fallen to 2,315 per 100,000.

== By location ==
Jozsef Hatala of the National Police (ORFK) stated in 2011 that the criminal underworld is strongest in Budapest and its surrounding counties. The murder rate is similar across the counties. In 2016, northern Hungary had the highest number of registered perpetrators of crime per 100,000 inhabitants and Western Transdanubia the lowest.

== See also ==
- Human trafficking in Hungary
- Police corruption in Hungary
