= Royal Albanian Gendarmerie =

Arm of Gendarmerie of Albania Arma e Xhandarmërisë
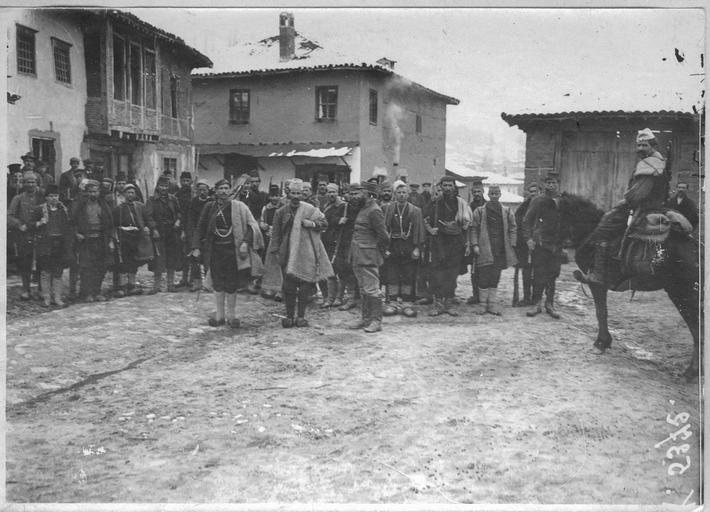
- Albanian gendarms in Hoçisht, January 1917
- Active: 1913–1939
- Country: Independent Albania; Principality of Albania; Albanian Republic; Albanian Kingdom
- Type: Gendarmerie
- Role: Military police and general expertise in permanent service of public security; Armed force
- Size: 3000– (approx) 5000
- Engagements: 1914–1915 Muslim revolts in Albania; Vlora War (1920); Italian invasion of Albania (1939)

The Arm of Gendarmerie (Albanian: Arma e Xhandarmërisë or Arma e Gjandarmërisë) was a gendarmerie force created after the proclamation of independence from the Ottoman Empire of Albania on 28 November 1912.

== History ==
=== Formation of "Arm of Gendarmerie" ===
After the declaration of independence of Albania, it was necessary to create a law enforcement force for maintaining order throughout the territory. The first Albanian government has been tasked with creating the Arms of Gendarmerie' Alem Tragjasin, Hysni Toskas, Sali Vranisht and Hajredin Hekalin.

In 1913, three battalions were created and headed by Major Hysen Prishtina in Vlorë, by Captain Ali Tetova in Berat and Major Ismail Haki Tatzati in Elbasan. Later in the year, the battalion of Durrës was established and also an academy for recruiting gendarmes in Tirana. The gendarmerie also set her regular gray-green uniform, red and black collar, hooded jacket and ranks in the front part of the collar.

In March 1914, the Great Powers sent Dutch officers who were in charge of organizing and training the Albanian Armed Forces, which also included the Arm of Gendarmerie and the Albanian Militia.

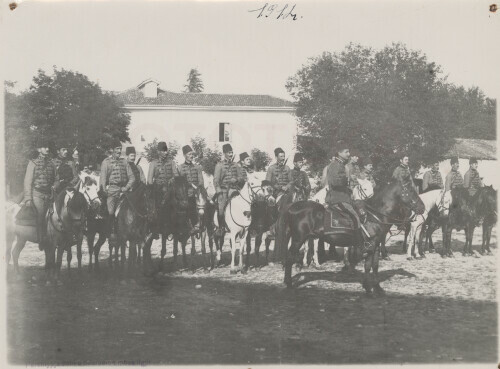
Photo of the gendarmerie forces in Shkoder, 1914.

In March 1914, the Great Powers established the International Commission of Control (Albanian: Komisioni Ndërkombëtar i Kontrollit or KNK) and sent in Albania some Dutch officers to organize and train the Albanian Armed Forces, which also included Arm of Gendarmerie and Albanian Militia. Part of this mission were Col. William De Veer and Major Lodewijk Thomson and several other experienced soldiers.

After discussions with KNK and the Government of Ismail Qemali, Major Thomson was engaged in the preparation of documents for the organization of the Albanian Gendarmerie and the intensive military training of the newly established. At the beginning, 1000 recruits would be prepared, while in its entirety, the Albanian Gendarmerie was foreseen with 5000 recruits. While General De Veer cooperated more with the KNK and conducted military operations on the front.

By the end of World War I, the formation of the new government on 25 December 1918, gathered many other officers and cadets with the intention to ending the anarchy that ruled across the country after the war. Under the command of Haki Ismail Tatzatit, the Italian organizer Ridolfo and Banush Hamdiu, the Arm of Gendarmerie was reestablished. Later, Ismail Haki Tatzati was appointed battalion commander in Berat, while in Durrës and Elbasan, respectively Major Kasem Qafëzezi and Major Mustafa Aranitasi.

=== "Arm of the Royal Gendarmerie" ===
In 1923 Ahmet Zogu, then Minister of Interior of Albania, hired Colonel Walter Francis Stirling as Minister Counselor, who then was asked to reform the Arm of Gendarmerie according to the British model.

The necessity of rebuilding and strengthening the armed forces, including the gendarmerie, was laid after the reconstruction of the state in 1920. Until 1924, efforts were made to give the gendarmerie the appearance and function of an organized force. A number of laws were drawn up to put the service of this weapon on a legal basis, such as, in determining the structure, territorial distribution according to the new administrative division, determining the tasks, its total number.

But even during the years 1920–1924, the shortcomings in the organization were obvious. This is evidenced in the report of the prefect of Gjirokastra in September 1924, where he stated, among other things, that: "the gendarmerie failed to become a strong support force of the executive power, an example of honor and discipline, a body that enjoyed full confidence of the people". Its condition was influenced by factors such as the lack of tradition and especially the little care of the state towards it, such as in financial treatment (low wages and disorders in their distribution), in clothing, relevant weaponry, in preparation and modern education. of graduates and officers, which would have the effect of replacing the old mentality inherited from the past, which was often observed during the performance of duty as in officers as well as the gendarmes. In addition, the political struggle between the opposing political organizations had involved its leadership structures and had led it to deviate from its main function, giving way to anarchy, present even during the government of Fan Stilian Noli (June-December 1924).

In 1925, Colonel Stirling was appointed General Inspector of the Albanian gendarmerie, which at that time had an effective 3,000 forces. The reforms that have taken was not always successful. He left the post of Counselor in 1926 but continued to stay in Albania until 1931, in the position of "Inspector General" at the Ministry of Internal Affairs. In 1926, Colonel Stirling was replaced by Major General Jocelyn Percy, who tried to reorganize the Albanian gendarmerie in the most useful structures. He stood at the helm of the gendarmerie until a few months before the Italian invasion of Albania in 1939.

In 1928, after parliament's consent to its own dissolution. A new constituent assembly amended the constitution making Albania a kingdom and transforming Ahmet Zogu into Zog I, "King of Albanians".

The Arm of Gendarmerie changed his name in Arm of the Royal Gendarmerie (Albanian: Arma e Gjindarmërisë Mbretnore or AGJM).

== See also ==
- List of gendarmeries
