= B-Gendarmerie =

Austrian police unit, established 1949

The B-Gendarmerie was a secret military formation that was raised in Allied-occupied Austria in the aftermath of World War II. The unit, which was first created in 1949, was the predecessor of Austria's Federal Armed Forces. It had duties similar to the Federal Border Guards (Bundesgrenzschutz, or BGS) in West Germany and the Baracked People's Police (Kasernierte Volkspolizei, or KVP) in East Germany.

As the Cold War began to take shape in post-war Europe, the Western Allies began to secretly permit former Axis powers to re-establish armed units for defence without informing their former ally, the Soviet Union. Former Wehrmacht officers and enlisted personnel were recruited to serve in the B-Gendarmerie. By 1954, the unit had grown to 100 officers and 4,000 troops. It was directly subordinated to the Federal Ministry of the Interior.

== Name ==
The exact meaning of the "B-" in the word B-Gendarmerie has never been clarified because of how it was secretly created in 1949. Suggestions have included it means the Bereitschaftsgendarmerie or "stand-by" gendarmerie compared to the "normal" "A-" gendarmerie; or the Besonderegendarmerie as in "special" gendarmerie. Another theory is that the "B-" is simply camouflage to hide the true nature of the unit because at the time of its formation, the Allies were not officially recognising any military organisations of the former Axis powers.

== History ==
After the defeat of Nazi Germany, the reinstated Austrian government wanted the country to be able to defend itself and to be able to take care of its own security. After initial scepticism, the allied Western powers also showed interest in this project. In particular, the communist takeover of power in Budapest in 1947 and Prague in the following year caused this rethinking. Since all four occupying powers, France, the Soviet Union, the United Kingdom and the United States had decided in 1945 to forbid any military activity in Austria, the Western Allies decided to allow the Austrian government to establish a paramilitary branch of the existing Gendarmerie. The formation of the B-Gendarmerie was primarily driven by the then Minister of the Interior, Oskar Helmer, and then Secretary of State and later Minister of Defence Ferdinand Graf.

From 1949 onwards, the already existing alarm groups of the gendarmerie have been separated into independent alarm units, which were internally called B-Gendarmerie. They were intended to be a special unit of the gendarmerie and had the mission of dealing with extraordinary events such as illegal border crossings, internal disturbances or actions of subversive forces. The alarm units were primarily equipped with American weapons and equipment. The gendarmes, trained for military training, were now trained in the Gendarmerie schools, which, due to the secret character of the entire B-Gendarmerie, was also associated with problems such as recruitment.

The Western occupying powers, that supported the entire project, had all information about secret recruitment lists and plans of the Austrians. The company, which was also designated as a gendarmerie special program, provided for the admission of former military officers knowledge in order to be able to dispose of them in wartime. By 1954 about 90,000 men have been registered. There were also plans for the soldiers of the B-Gendarmerie to be brought abroad, especially to Italy or North Africa, in the event of a communist coup, and to form an Austrian exile military force. In November 1954 it pointed out, that the Soviet Union was well informed about the activities of the B-Gendarmerie. However, this did not have any consequences since, the Soviet Union was now interested in a united neutral Austria due to the geopolitical situation.

In 1950, the first permanent units were built. In each of the three western occupation zones one battalion, all under the cover of the gendarmerie academies have been built up. The beginning of the B-Gendarmerie can be fixed with the 1 August 1952 under the training and supervision of former Wehrmacht officers. The new formation was directly subordinated to the Federal Ministry of the Interior. The respective local governments were responsible for the administration. On 28 October 1953, a separate department for the B-Gendarmerie was created in the Ministry of the Interior, whereby it was completely separated from the civilian government. At the end of 1953, the B-Gendarmerie consisted of about 100 officers and 4,000 men. As a result, up to 1955 a total of 10 gendarmerie schools, two other driving units, a department D - a supply camp jointly run with the Americans, and a department K (K for courses (Kurs) in German) to take over the training of future officers, as well as two so-called telegraph schools.

In 1954, the B-gendarmerie officially designated not only the protection of the frontier and the fight against unrest, but also the use of natural catastrophes and so-called tactical operations in the event of a war effort. The fear of war was not unfounded: the East-West conflict had developed into the Cold War, and the war in Korea (1950–1953), which, like Austria and Germany after the Second World War, became a western and an eastern one Zone of occupation was seen as a proxy war, as it might also arise in other conflict zones.

== See also ==
- List of defunct paramilitary organizations
- List of law enforcement agencies

== Bibliography ==
- Blasi, Walter; Schmidl, Erwin A.; Schneider, Felix (2004). B-Gendarmerie, Waffenlager und Nachrichtendienste. Der militärische Weg zum Staatsvertrag (in German). Vienna: Böhlau-Verlag, ISBN 3-205-77267-9.
- Prieschl, Martin (2010). Keimzelle des Bundesheeres. B-Gendarmerie 1952–1955 (in German). In: Österreich-Edition 21 [Loseblattsammlung]. Braunschweig: Archiv-Verlag.
- Stifter, Christian (1997). Die Wiederaufrüstung Österreichs. Die geheime Remilitarisierung der westlichen Besatzungszonen 1945–1955 (in German). Innsbruck: Studien-Verlag, ISBN 3-7065-1176-2.

== Further reading (in German) ==
- The B-Gendarmerie 1952-1955 (PDF-Datei; 11 kB)
- Austrian Gendarmerie, B-Gendarmerie, Austrian Armed Forces (PDF-Datei; 104 kB)
- The B-Gendarmerie - more than an Episode (PDF-Datei; 133 kB)
- Der Sprung vom Turm (Text in German of „Presse“)
