= Royal Prussian State Gendarmerie =

Gendarmerie of the Kingdom of Prussia from 1812 to 1918

The Royal Prussian State Gendarmerie (German: Königlich Preußische Landgendarmerie) was the gendarmerie of the Kingdom of Prussia from 1812 to 1920. It replaced a gendarmerie operated during the 1807-1808 French occupation following their victory over Prussia in the War of the Fourth Coalition. The Prussian King Frederick William III ordered the new gendarmerie established in 1812 to fight crime and to arrest suspicious persons in particular the "ubiquitous vagrants". They proved rather effective at the latter task and are thought to have arrested more vagrants than criminals. They were deployed across the country side to single-man posts, which meant they were quick to respond to disorder but in small numbers.

Until the foundation of the Prussian security police in 1919, the corps was the largest police force in the empire after the gendarmeries of Bavaria and Saxony with 1918 over 5,500 gendarmes, albeit fewer in number than the Berlin Royal Protection Team with around 7,000 officers and the Hamburg Protection Team with around 6,000 officers. In contrast to the Royal Saxon Land Gendarmerie, founded in 1810, which the Ministry of the Interior, the Prussian gendarmerie was militarily organized and part of the army . In the war against France in 1870/71 and in the First World War in 1914/18, it formed the core of the Feldgendarmerie.

In 1920 the gendarmerie was demilitarised by the victorious Allies of the First World War and converted into the Landjäger.

After the annexation of the Electorate of Hesse in 1866, the Land Gendarmerie Corps of the Electoral Hessian Army and the Royal Hanover Landdragon Corps were taken over into Prussian services when the Kingdom of Hanover was annexed.

== See also ==
- Grand Duchy of Baden Gendarmerie Corps
