= Law enforcement in Chad =

The Gendarmerie Nationale and the Police Nationale are the national police forces of Chad.

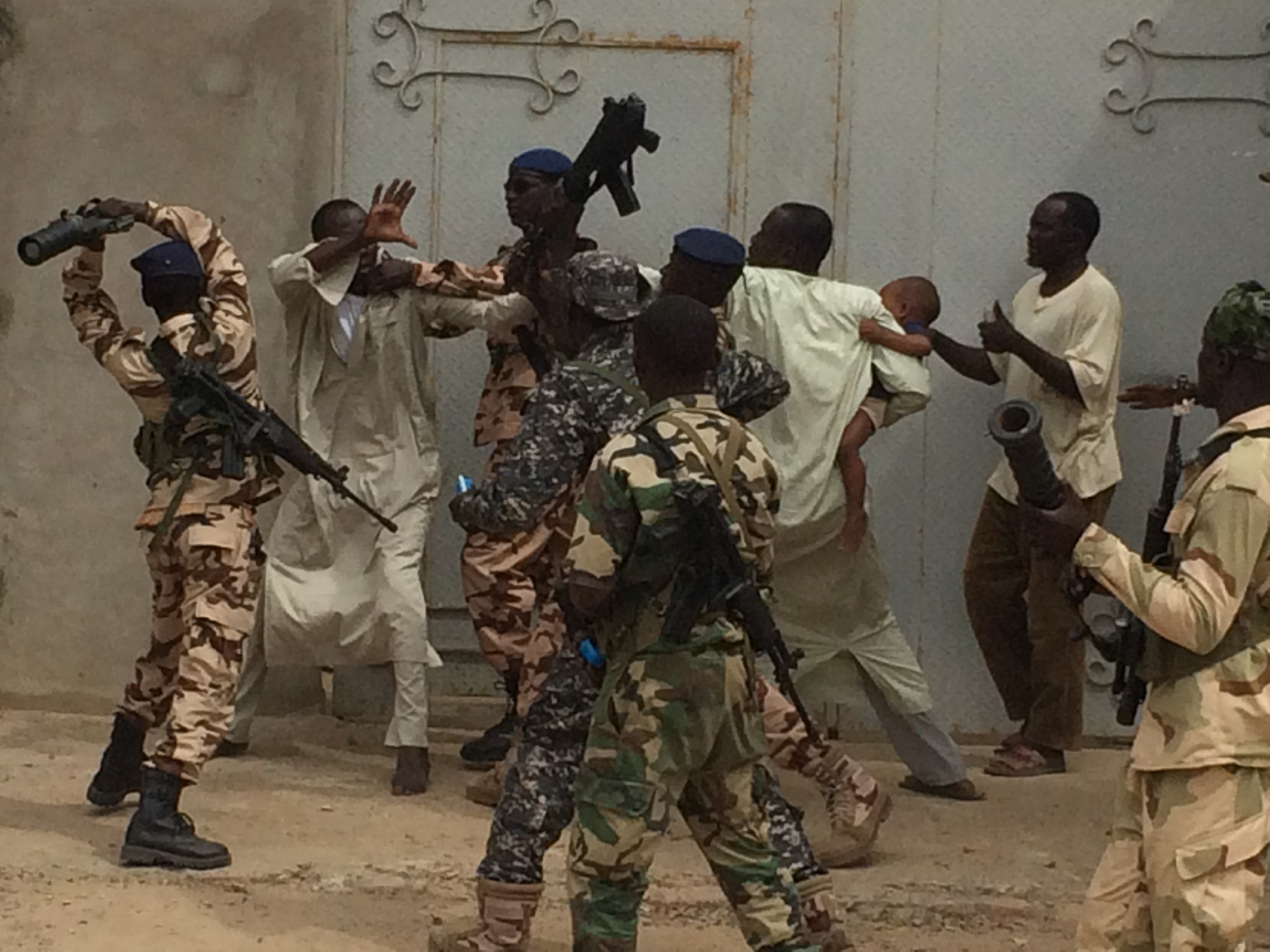
Protest in N'Djamena in January 2018.

== Historical secret police organizations ==
- Direction de la Documentation et de la Sécurité (DDS) (Directorate of Documentation and Security)

== Secret police organizations ==
- Agence nationale de sécurité (ANS) (National Security Agency)
