= Gendarmerie (Austria) =

Austrian federal police agency

Federal Gendarmerie Bundesgendarmerie
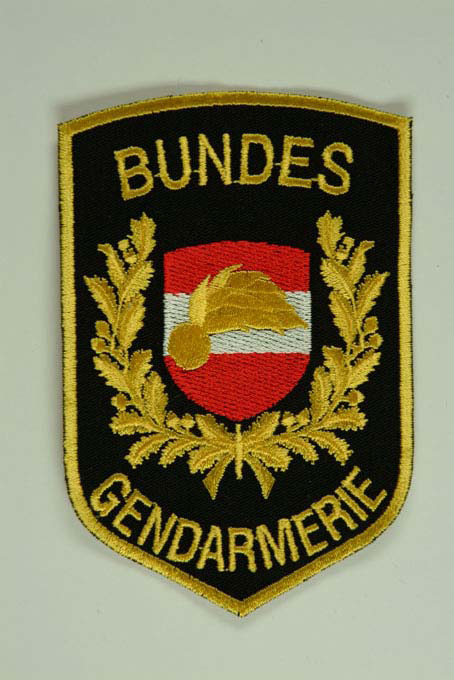
- Gendarmerie patch

Agency overview
- Formed: 8 June 1849
- Dissolved: 1 July 2005
- Superseding agency: Federal Police (Bundespolizei)

Jurisdictional structure
- Federal agency: Austria
- Operations jurisdiction: Austria
- General nature: Federal law enforcement; Gendarmerie; Civilian police

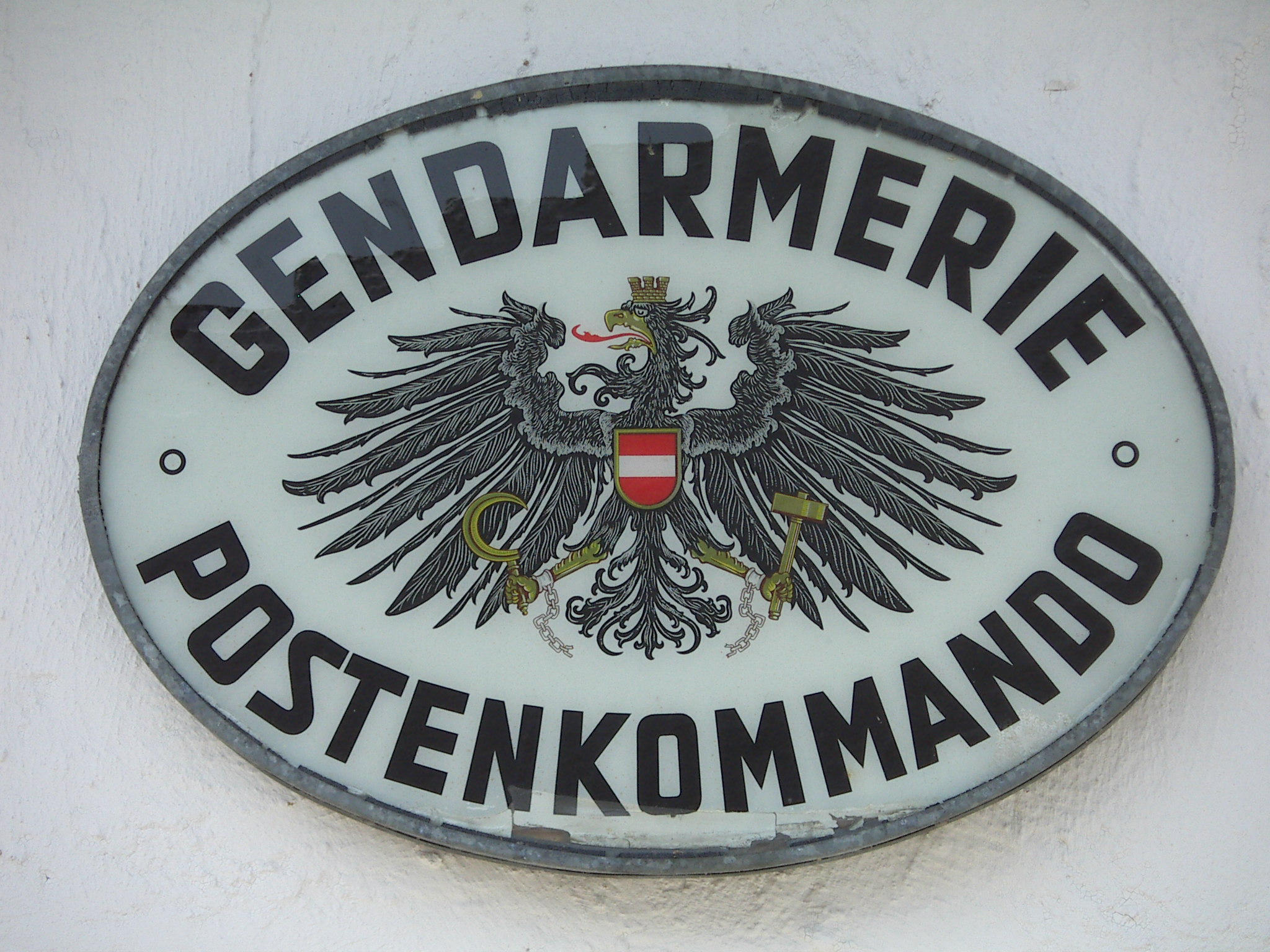
Illuminated panel of a Gendarmerie station

The Federal Gendarmerie (German: Bundesgendarmerie) was an Austrian federal police agency. It was responsible for approximately two thirds of the population on approximately 98% of Austrian national territory, alongside the Federal Safety Guard Corps (Bundessicherheitswachekorps) and Detective Corps (Kriminalbeamtenkorps). All Austrian law enforcement agencies were merged into the Federal Police (Bundespolizei) agency, with effect from 1 July 2005.

== History ==
=== K.k. Gendarmerie ===
The idea to establish a Gendarmerie (from French: gens d'armes: "armed people") military force charged with police duties originated from the Revolutions of 1848 in the Austrian Empire. It was formed on 8 June 1849 by order of Emperor Francis Joseph as a component of the k.k. Army, modelled on the Gendarmerieregiment in the Austrian Kingdom of Lombardy–Venetia incorporated upon the 1815 Congress of Vienna. Up to then 1776 set up "military police corps" existed in Austria as a militarily organized corps alone in large cities like Vienna, Lemberg, Krakau, Przemyśl.

Johann Franz Kempen, Baron of Fichtenstamm, was appointed first General-Gendarmerie-Inspector. While it was originally a military corps responsible for the whole Austrian Empire, gradually over the second half of the nineteenth century it became responsible for public order. Initially composed of eighteen regiments and part of the army, its operational command was transferred to the Austrian Ministry for the Interior in 1860 and wholly severed from the armed forces in 1867. Nevertheless, training, uniforms, ranks, and even pay remained patterned after the army. The military origins were still represented in the retention of the old insignia, the flaming grenade, after the Gendamerie became a component of the civil administration in 1918. The predominantly grey uniform also owed its inspiration to the Austro-Hungarian Army.

Beside for the maintenance of the public order, the k.k. Gendarmerie became a vital instrument for suppression of constitutional or democratic ambitions during the post-revolutionary era of Austrian neo-absolutism in the 1850s and 60s, which brought it the hate of the middle class.

=== Austro-Hungarian Monarchy ===
After the Austro-Hungarian Compromise of 1867, the Cisleithanian k.k. Gendarmerie was no longer responsible for the Transleithanian lands controlled by the Hungarian Armed Forces (Hungarian: Magyar Honvédség). The control over the Kingdom of Croatia-Slavonia and the Principality of Transylavania did not pass to the Hungarian forces until 1876. In 1881 the Royal Hungarian (k.u.) Gendarmerie (Csendőrség) was established.

With the implementation of the Austrian Gendarmerie Law on 2 February 1876, it was finally separated from the Austro-Hungarian Army, though the newly established agency was still answerable to the Austrian Minister of Defence and its service members were officially part of the Cisleithanian Landwehr armed forces.

Organisation of the k.k. Gendarmerie from 1876
Reg. No.	Seat	Crown land	Reg. No.	Seat	Crown land
1	Vienna	Lower Austria	9	Zadar	Dalmatia
2	Prague	Bohemia	10	(to Hungarian Defence Force)	Transylvania
3	Innsbruck	Tyrol and Vorarlberg	11	Linz	Upper Austria
4	Brno	Moravia	12	Ljubljana	Carniola
5	Lemberg	Galicia	13	Czernowitz	Bukovina
6	Graz	Styria	14	Klagenfurt	Carinthia
7	Trieste	Istria	15	Opava	Silesia
8	(to Hungarian Defence Force)	Croatia-Slavonia	16	Salzburg	Salzburg

Before World War I, fingerprint analysis (dactyloscopy) and police dogs had been introduced. A special Alpine branch was formed in 1906, mainly to protect the part of Tyrol that bordered the Kingdom of Italy. Since then, alpine rescue operations and border patrols have remained an important Gendarmerie function. During the First World War, the Gendarmerie was used in a number of roles including maintaining public order in the hinterland areas as military police (Feldgendarmerie), fighting espionage and partisans, and arresting deserters. In addition, they also provided scout, courier and orderly assistance to the General Staff.

=== First Austrian Republic ===
After the war the Gendarmerie in the Republic of Austria remained militarily organized, but was employed for civilian tasks. Not until 1918/19 the gendarmes officially became public servants, no longer subordinate to military law but to civil jurisdiction. After the lost war, considering Austria's shrunken size, the number of Gendarmerie service members was largely reduced.

In 1934, the Gendarmerie were involved in the Austrian Civil War and increasingly infiltrated by Nazis. After the 1938 Anschluss to Nazi Germany, several high ranking gendarmes were interned in concentration camps and large numbers of gendarmes were locked up, dismissed, retired or transferred for disciplinary reasons. The remainder were integrated into the German Ordnungspolizei.

=== Second Austrian Republic ===
With the re-establishment of the Republic of Austria in 1945 a Gendarmeriekommando was created. At the beginning the control was disputed between members of the executive, so the Gendarmerie had to get along initially with few officials. However, circumstances soon improved so that the Gendarmerie was again able to ensure national order. In October 1950 a general strike was proclaimed by the Communist Party, and the deployment of the security forces suppressed an October rebellion.

In 1952 the B-Gendarmerie was set up, with heavy weapons, to strengthen the Gendarmerieeinheit. It was set up after the conclusion of the Convention and the basic unit of the Federal army had been formed. It is not sure whether the initial "B" stood for "Bereitschaft" (Readiness) or "Besondere" (Special) Gendarmerie. This paramilitary Unit would have been used in the case of an invasion by the Soviet army in the western zones of occupation of Austria.

Alpine posts and high Alpine posts were served by 750 Gendarmerie Alpinists and guides. In 1988 more than 1,300 rescue missions were conducted, many with the aid of Agusta-Bell helicopters in the Gendarmerie inventory.

Numbering 11,600 in 1990, the Gendarmerie had responsibilities similar to the Federal Police but operated in rural areas and in towns without a contingent of Federal Police or local police. There was one member of the Gendarmerie for each 397 inhabitants in the areas subject to its jurisdiction; there was one member of the Federal Police for each 316 residents in the cities it patrolled.

The Gendarmerie was organized into eight provincial commands (every province, except Vienna), ninety district commands, and 1,077 posts. A post could have from as few as three to as many as thirty gendarmes; most had fewer than ten. The provincial headquarters was composed of a staff department, criminal investigation department, training department, and area departments comprising two or three district commands. Basic Gendarmerie training was the responsibility of the individual provincial commands, each of which having had a school for new recruits. Leadership and specialized courses were given at the central Gendarmerie school in Mödling near Vienna. The basic course for NCOs lasted one year, while the basic course for Gendarmerie officers lasted two years.

Until 30 June 2005 the Federal Gendarmerie was one of the law enforcement agencies of Austria, beside the Federal Safety Guard Corps (Bundessicherheitswachekorps) and the "Judiciary Officers' Corps" (Kriminalbeamtenkorps). The Federal Gendarmerie was responsible for all parts of Austria, except the Federal Capital (Vienna), as well as the state capitals (except Bregenz) and other larger cities of Austria (usually 'Statutarstädte'). It provided security for approximately two thirds of the population on approximately 98% of the Austrian national territory.

== Other units ==
There was a transport department, a Kriminalabteilung (and not as in many TV-series the "CID") and a Grenzgendarmerie (border gendarmerie) beside the individual Gendarmerieposten in the municipalities, which were increasingly folded up lately. For special employments the Gendarmerie maintained special units such as dog handler, alpine gendarmes and flight rescuers.

== Cobra ==
The terrorist assault on the OPEC headquarters in 1975 led to the establishment of a special task force of the Gendarmerie, the Gendarmerieeinsatzkommando EKO Cobra. This special unit trains near Wr. Neustadt (city approx. 50 km south of Vienna) and gets activated for all acts of terrorism and kidnapping in addition to other particularly dangerous employments.

Furthermore there are so-called in the context of the Cobra since 1981 Air Mars neck, those as civilian companions during endangered flights Austrian Airlines along-fly. This system became of that The USA after the events of the 11. September 2001 taken over.

== Bereitschaftspolizei ==
A battalion of Bereitschaftspolizei for extensive use in events such as large meetings, concerts, soccer games, demonstrations, pl there were additionally separately in each Land of the Federal Republic a "Gendarmerie employment unit EE". This consisted of particularly trained gendarmes with an employment of the individual posts was likewise pulled together.

== Amalgamation ==
The reorganization of the Austrian law enforcement bodies started in 2002. It was decided that the Gendarmerie, federal safety guard corps and Kriminalbeamtenkorps should be amalgamated. On December 9, 2004, the National council with the votes of ÖVP and FPÖ decided this should take place on July 1, 2005 and that the new name should be the "Federal Police".

At the time of the amalgamation from Gendarmerie, Federal Safety Guard Corps and Kriminalbeamtenkorps to the Federal Police there were approx. 15,000 officials.

== Former organisational structure ==
- Federal Ministry for The Interior (BMI)
  - Central management for public security (section II of the BMI)
    - 9 Safety managements (Simmer) in all States of the Federal Republic
    - 8 Landesgendarmeriekommanden (LGKdo) in all States of the Federal Republic except Vienna
      - Bezirksgendarmeriekommanden (BGK)
        - Gendarmerieposten (GP), frontier control post (GÜP) and check points (Greko)

== See also ==
- Austrian Armed Forces
