= Law enforcement in Mauritania =

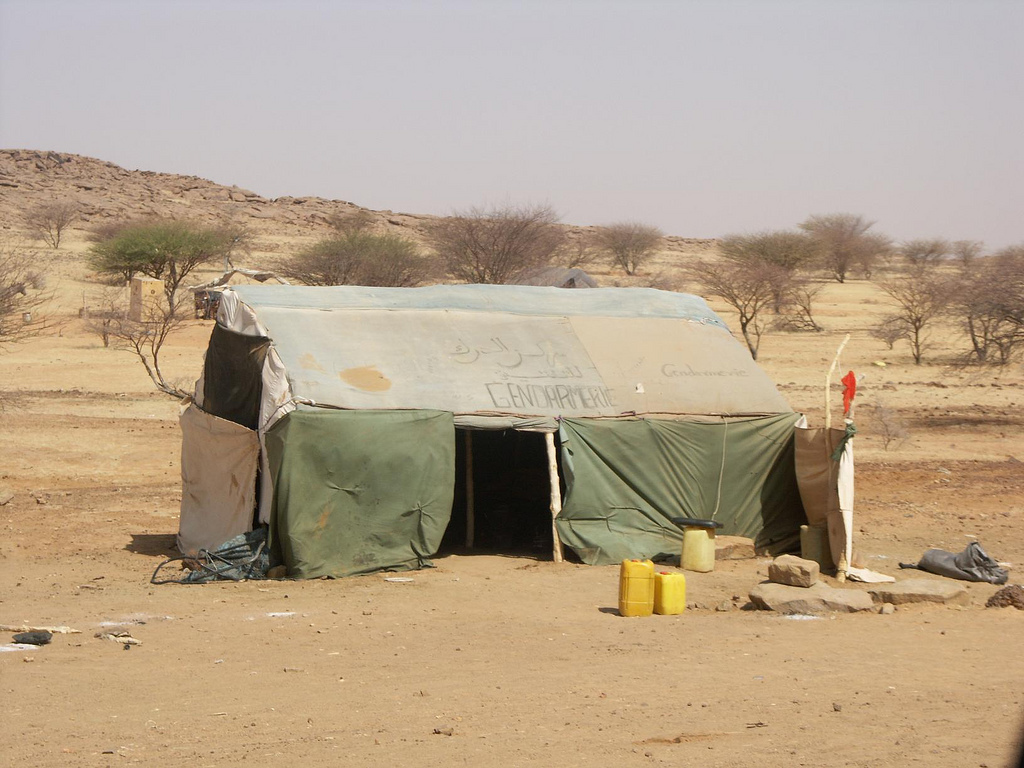
A gendarmerie post in a rural part of Mauritania (2016).

The Gendarmerie Nationale is the national police force of Mauritania. The gendarmerie is part of the military and maintains posts in the urban and rural parts of the country.

In 2019, 140 gendarmes were deployed as part of a UN multinational peacekeeping force in the Central African Republic.

Since December 2024, the Commander of the Gendarmerie Nationale is Gen. Ahmed Mahmoud Ould Taya.

== See also ==
- Armed Forces of Mauritania

== Notes ==
=== Sources ===
1. World Police Encyclopedia, ed. by Dilip K. Das & Michael Palmiotto published by Taylor & Francis. 2004,
2. World Encyclopedia of Police Forces and Correctional Systems, second edition, Gale., 2006
3. Sullivan, Larry E. Encyclopedia of Law Enforcement. Thousand Oaks: Sage Publications, 2005.
