= Grand Duchy of Baden Gendarmerie Corps =

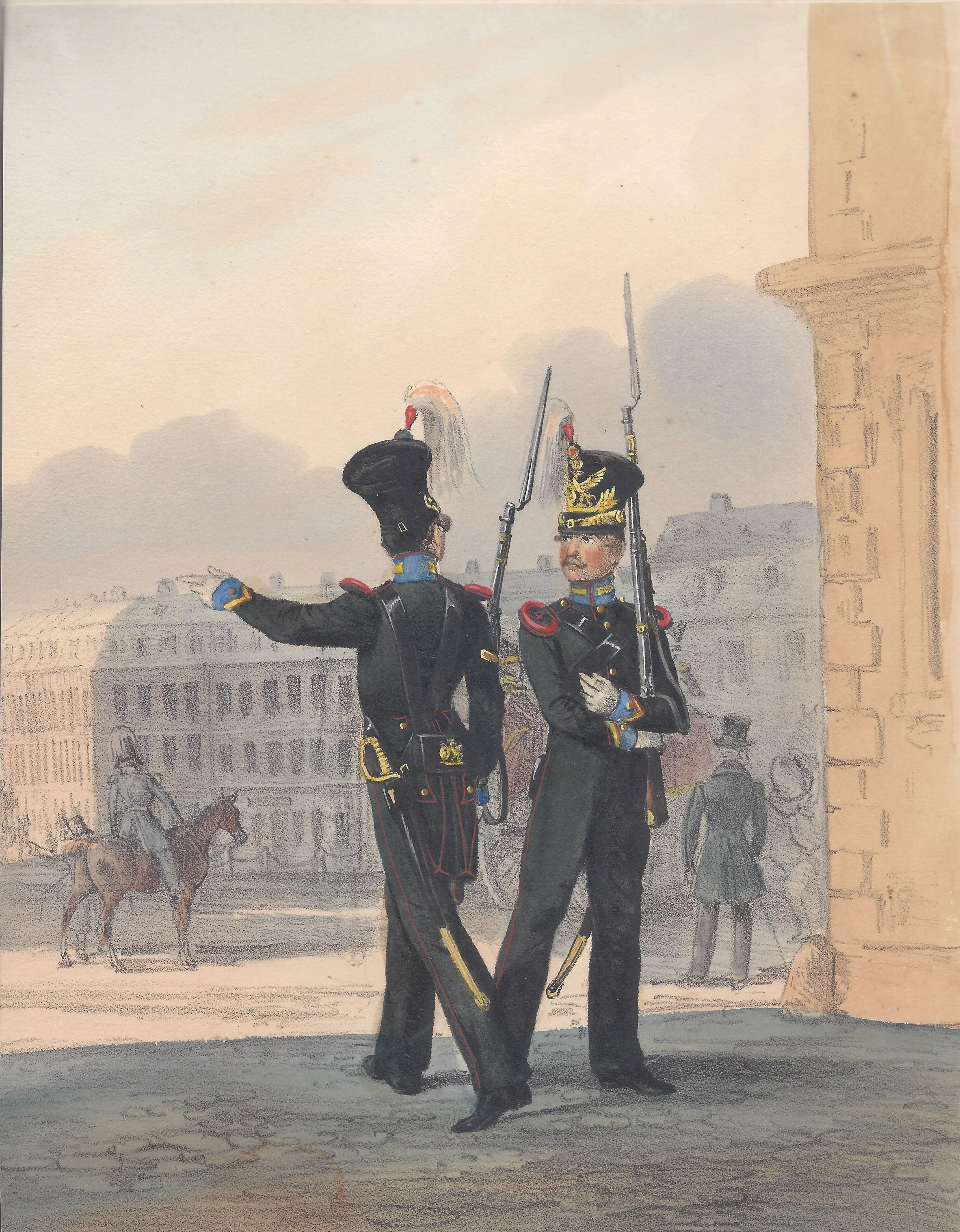
Baden Eckert Gendarmerie Brigadier Gendarme

From 1829 to 1918, the Grand Duchy of Baden's Gendarmerie Corps formed the gendarmerie of the Grand Duchy of Baden. Until the military agreement with the Kingdom of Prussia on 25 November 1870, it was part of the Baden Army; thereafter it was exclusively subordinated to the Ministry of the Interior in Karlsruhe, where the headquarters of the Corps was located. Its last commander was Major General August Anheuser (1846–1933) from 1905 to March 1919.

== History ==
Compared to other states of the German confederation, whose gendarmeries had generally been founded in the 1810s on the model of the French Imperial Gendarmerie (e.g. Prussia and Bavaria in 1812, Hanover in 1815, Oldenburg in 1817) the Baden Corps was set up relatively late.

Around 1900, other Baden police authorities existed, the so-called state police in the cities of Mannheim, Heidelberg, Karlsruhe, Pforzheim, Rastatt, Baden, Freiburg im Breisgau and Constance. They were not subordinate to the local authorities but, like the Gendarmerie, to the Interior Ministry. The municipal police of the towns and villages, on the other hand, were subordinate to local mayors.

=== Foundation ===
The Corps was established by a decree of Grand Duke Louis on 1 December 1829. This had been preceded by the Grand Ducal edict of 3 October:

The constant need to ensure diligent handling of public law and order and security in the interior of the state of Baden has therefore prompted us ... to set up our own armed, militarily organised corps called the "Gendarmerie Corps" and to taks it with the maintenance of public law, order and security within the state of Baden from 1 December 1829.

— Vor 150 Jahren, p. 23.

On 31 December 1831, Louis's successor, Grand Duke Leopold, issued a Gendarmerie Act (Gesetz über die Gendarmerie) in which, inter alia, its relationship to civil and military authorities was clearly defined. This followed the earlier publication on the organisation and instructions for the Gendarmerie.

After that, the Corps was subordinated to the Ministry of the Interior in all official matters and was not to any other civil authority. Although part of the Army, no military organisation had any authority over the Corps. However, the Gendarmerie was obliged to respond promptly to requests from judicial and administrative authorities, with the responsibility for the purely legal execution of the requests lying solely with the requesting authority. Section 20 expressly stated that civil authorities had no right whatsoever to use the gendarmes for errands or other irrelevant activities. Gendarmerie officers were tasked with preventing such improper use.

In joint operations with the Army, in the event of two commanders having the same rank, the Gendarmerie officers took precedence. In the case of a joint operation led by a senior Army officer, the latter had to take the Gendarmerie officer's requests into account. A gendarme corresponded in rank to a corporal (Korporal) in the Army, a Brigadier to an Army lance sergeant (Sergeant), a constable (Wachtmeister) to a sergeant (Feldwebel), but each took precedence over their corresponding army equivalent in joint operations. In principle, the Gendarmerie was under military law. This regulation probably lasted until at least 1870, possibly until the end of the monarchy in 1918.

=== Structure ===
The strength of the Corps was initially 248 men, but grew to 560 gendarmes by the end of First World War in 1918. Similar to the six districts of Baden that existed in 1829, it was divided into six divisions when it was founded, which in turn consisted of several gendarmerie 'brigades'. As in France and other German states, a gendarmerie 'brigade' usually consisted of one 'brigadier' and four gendarmes.

As part of the Baden Army, the corps was subordinate to both the Ministry of War and the Ministry of the Interior (see below). It was led by the corps commander, a major, lieutenant colonel, colonel or general. The divisional commanders were probably captains.

A radical change in Corps structure resulted from Baden's military agreement with Prussia in 1870. The agreement ended the independence of the Baden Army, which was integrated into the Prussian Army. Since the military status of the Gendarmerie remained unchanged, from this point on it formed the only Baden military force and continued to report to the Grand Duke. This regulation corresponded to the situation in other German federal states without independent armed forces, e.g. in the Grand Duchy of Oldenburg with its Grand Duchy of Oldenburg Gendarmerie Corps.

By 1900 at the latest, the Corps was divided into four districts (Distrikte), which in turn were divided into sub-districts (Bezirke). District officers reported to the Corps Commander in Karlsruhe. The districts were led by senior constables (Oberwachtmeister). At this point in time, but no later than 1914, gendarmes and constables became auxiliary officers of the public prosecutor's office.

The prerequisite for joining the Corps in 1829 was at least six years of military service, impeccable leadership qualities and abilities of reading, writing and arithmetic. The age at recruitment was between 25 and 36 years of age.

=== Uniform, armament, equipment ===
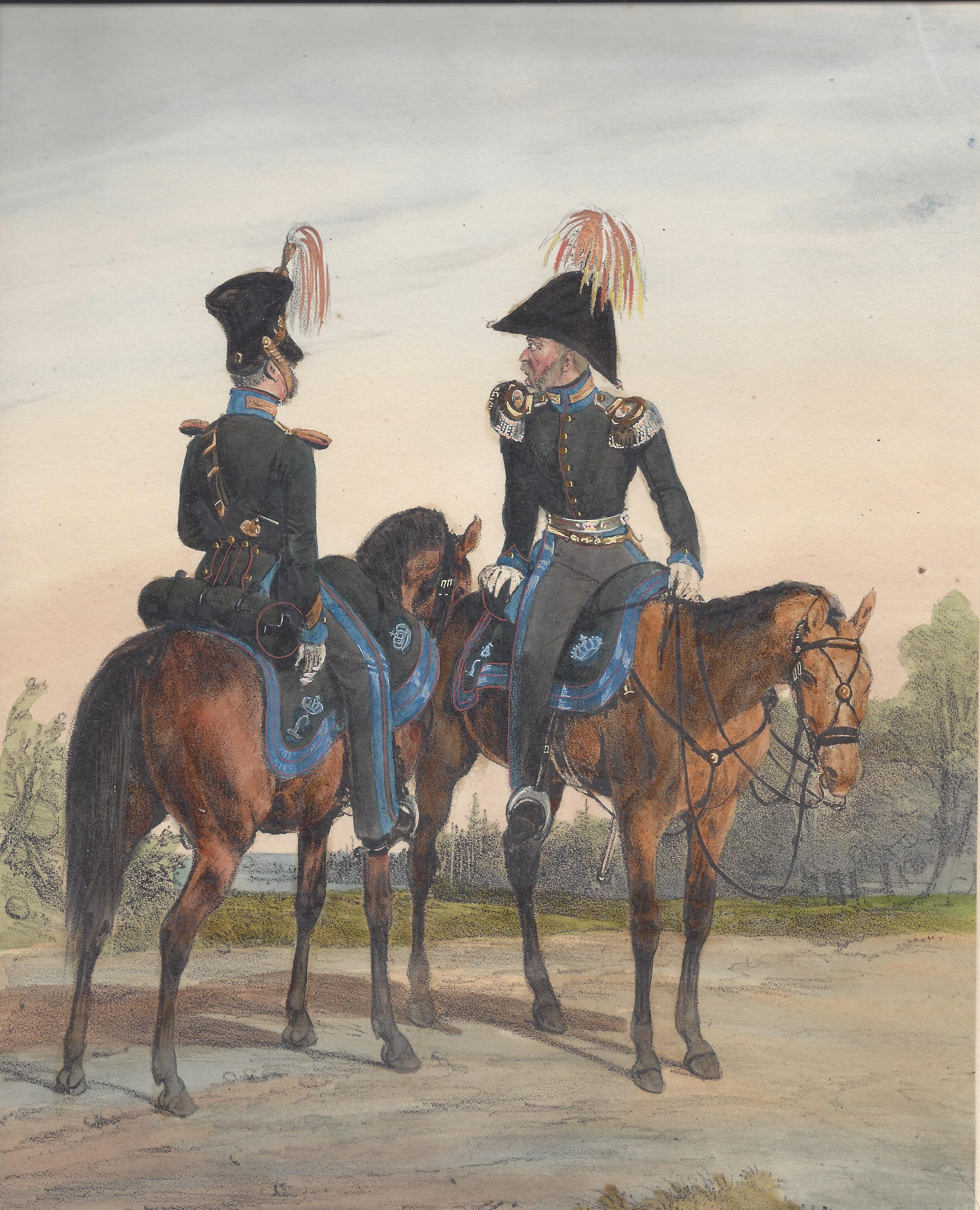
Baden Gendarmerie

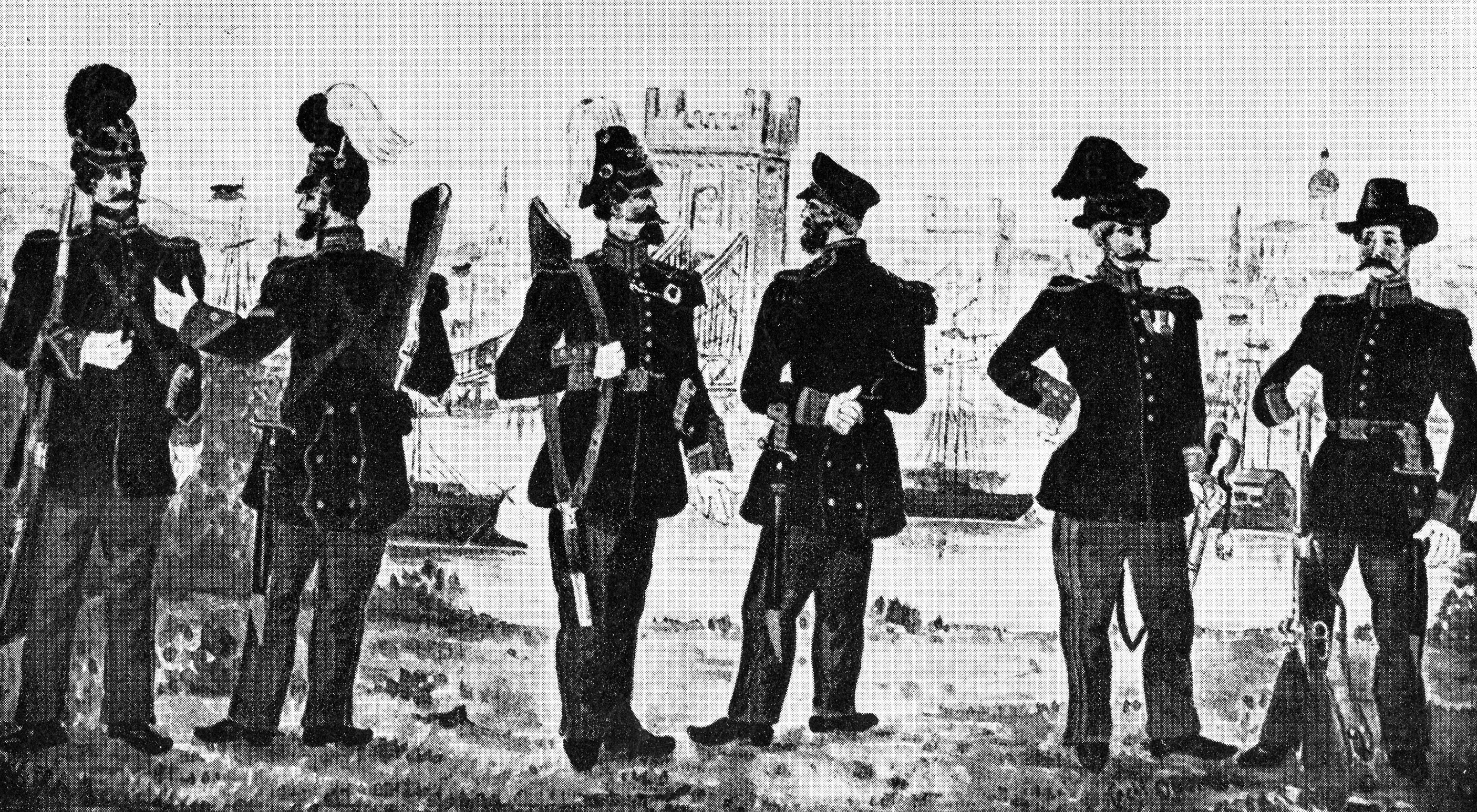
Baden Gendarmerie, 1847–1863

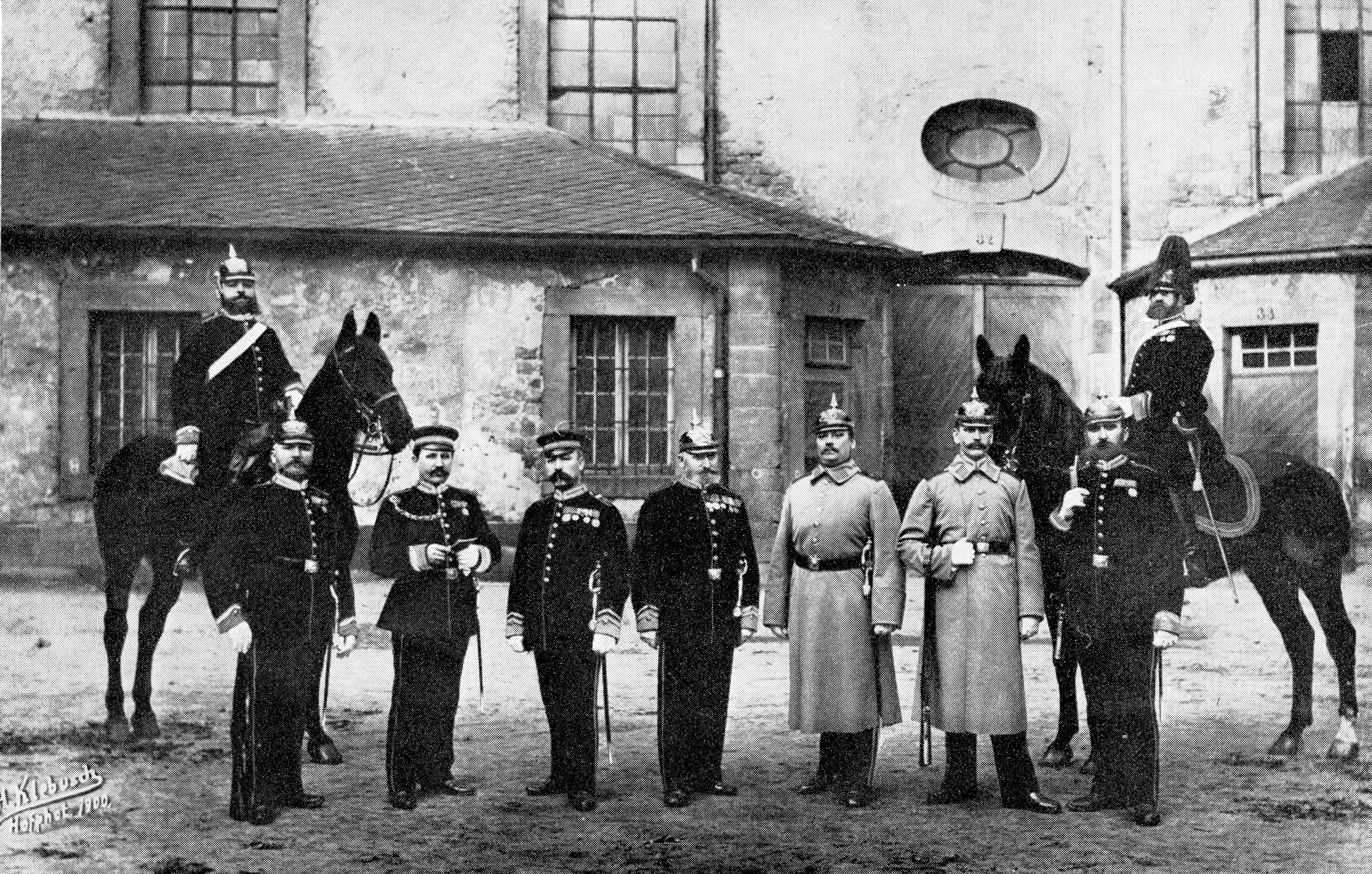
Baden Gendarmerie, 1899

The uniforms were based on those of the Prussian gendarmerie. Gray trousers with blue stripes were worn with a green uniform tunic, which, however, was a much darker shade (so-called Russian green) than the Prussian gendarmerie tunic. In addition, there were black gaiters and, for the gendarmes, a shako with a white plume of horsehair, while the officers sported a bicorne. The shako was apparently replaced by a helmet in the 1840s. In 1869, the so-called Pickelhaube was introduced, based on the Prussian model, as well as blue and black trousers, also based on the Prussian model. The Baden griffon was worn on both the shako and the helmet as a national emblem. A wide-brimmed hat was apparently worn between 1863 and 1869 (see uniform table). Probably from 1869 at the latest a peaked cap was introduced. The Gendarmerie Corps clearly differed from the Baden Army in terms of uniforms. Although the uniform cut was apparently always identical, troops from Baden, like the Prussian Army, generally wore blue, with the exception of the dragoons who wore light blue.

The arms carried by the gendarmes initially consisted of a percussion rifle, a pistol and a sabre. The sabre was later replaced by a yatagan, which in turn was superseded by an officer's dress sword in the 1870s. Rifles were replaced by carbines in the 1880s.

How many of the gendarmes were mounted is unknown. The only thing that is certain is that, in 1890, a mounted department was specially set up. As far as is known, this was a Baden peculiarity, since in other German gendarmeries the gendarmes were either on foot or on horseback, but not formed into a special unit.

As in other German gendarmeries, a field grey uniform was introduced in Baden by a regulation dated 26 April 1917, which corresponded to the uniform of the Prussian army. The jacket (Waffenrock) and 'blouse' (Bluse M 1915) were field grey, the trousers grey. It is not known whether, and if so to what extent, this regulation was implemented by the end of the First World War. It was definitively ended with the founding of the Baden Republic, when the military status of the gendarmerie was abolished in 1920 and the gendarmes were given the status of civil servants (see below).

Although the Baden Ministry of War was responsible for equipping and arming the gendarmerie up to the military convention of 1870, accounting was always carried out within the budget of the Ministry of the Interior, which was also responsible for the use of the Corps.

During the Baden Revolution and the Imperial Constitution Campaign of 1848/49, which had greater popular support in Baden and south-west Germany than in other parts of the German Confederation the Gendarmerie was temporarily on the verge of being dissolved because the revolutionaries regarded it as a monarchist instrument of rule. At times, at least regionally, the service came to a complete standstill or the gendarmes behaved passively, even to instructions from the Corps Headquarters. After the end of the revolution, the Corps, like the Army itself, was reorganized with Prussian support.

=== Salary around 1884 ===
Little is known about the salary of the Baden Gendarmerie. A salary list with the annual salaries from 1884 has survived:

- Sergeant (Oberwachtmeister): 1,500 marks (ℳ)
- Constable (Wachtmeister) (1st class: 1,150 ℳ
- Constable 2nd class: 1,050 ℳ
- Gendarme (Gendarm) 1st class: 950 ℳ
- Gendarme 2nd class: 875 ℳ
- Gendarme 3rd class: 800 ℳ

=== School of Gendarmerie from 1908 ===
On 1 October 1908, the School of Gendarmerie (Gendarmerieschule) was set up at the Corps Headquarters in Karlsruhe at Rüppurerstraße 31, probably based on the Prussian model (q.v.), in order to centralize the previously decentralized training of gendarmerie. It had previously taken place in the four districts of Constance, Freiburg, Karlsruhe and Mannheim under the direction of so-called training constables (Lehrwachtmeistern).

The course itself (Lehrkurs) lasted three and a half months out of a total of six months of training. The first chief instructor at the school was Major Stemmermann, who also taught some of the subjects. The civilian trainer was senior instructor (Oberlehrer) Fischer from the municipal school in Karlsruhe. A grand ducal public prosecutor was provided for teaching law, but his name was not yet known when the school opened. For practical training, a training constable (Lehrwachtmeistern) was provided.

== 1918/19 restructuring: from state police to Baden Gendarmerie ==
In the course of the November Revolution of 1918, the Gendarmerie was temporarily dissolved and transformed into the state police force. The gendarmes now briefly held the rank of Landesschutzmann ("state policeman"). The most important feature of the restructuring was the (temporary) abolition of military status, which removed their combatant status. In April 1919, the force was re-established as the Baden Gendarmerie. At that time, the head of the Gendarmerie was former public prosecutor and now Colonel Hermann Kuenzer who had been the commander of the Baden State Police. Military jurisdiction existed until 17 August 1920. From this point on, officers and gendarmerie officials also had the right to vote.

In 1921, the rank structure was partially changed. The Police Act of June 1923, which replaced the 1831 Act (see above), brought about a radical change. The Corps command and the district commands were abolished and integrated into the Ministry of the Interior, which eliminated the double subordination of gendarmes to military and civilian superiors. The uniforms largely corresponded to those of the old Corps, apart from the change in Grand-Ducal insignia.

== Remembrance ==
On the occasion of the 150th anniversary of the founding of the Corps, a ceremony organized by the German Police Union for the state of Baden-Württemberg, took place on 1 December 1979 in the town hall at Merzhausen.

== See also ==
- Royal Prussian State Gendarmerie

== Literature ==
- Baden Ministry of the Interior (1830). Organisation und Instruktionen für die Großherzoglich Badische Gendarmerie. Karlsruhe: G. Braun.
- August Steinheuser: Geschichte des Großh(erzoglichen). Badischen Gendarmerie-Corps von der Errichtung im Jahre 1829 bis einschließlich 1899, Karlsruhe (Braun) 1899.
- Die Kämpfe in Südwestdeutschland 1919–1923. Im Auftrag des Reichskriegsministeriums bearbeitet und herausgegeben von der Forschungsanstalt für Kriegs- und Heeresgeschichte, Berlin (Mittler) 1939 (Darstellungen aus den Nachkriegskämpfen deutscher Truppen und Freikorps, Vol. 5).
- Gewerkschaft der Polizei. Landesbezirk Baden-Württemberg (publ.): Vor 150 Jahren. Gründung der Großherzoglich Badischen Gendarmerie, o. O. (Hilden, Verlag Deutsche Polizei), o. J. (1979) (on pp. 65–70 the Gesetz über die Gendarmerie of 31 December 1831 is reproduced).
- Eberhard Laux: Der neuzeitliche Staat und seine Verwaltung. Beiträge zur Entwicklungsgeschichte seit 1700, Stuttgart 1988. ISBN 3-515-07168-7
- Ingo Löhken: Polizeiuniformen der Süddeutschen Staaten 1872–1932. Baden, Bayern, Hessen, Württemberg, Reichslande, Friedberg/H. 1988. ISBN 3-7909-0328-0
- Heinrich Ambros Eckert/Dietrich Monten: Das deutsche Bundesheer. Nach dem Uniformwerk aus den Jahren 1835 bis 1843, Dortmund (Harenberg) 1990. ISBN 3-611-00132-5.
- Bernd Wirsing: Die Geschichte des Gendarmeriekorps und deren Vorläuferorganisationen in Baden, Württemberg und Bayern, 1750–1850, Phil. Diss. Universität Konstanz 1991 (Maschinenmanuskript).
- Manfred Teufel: Die südwestdeutsche Polizei im Obrigkeits- und Volksstaat. Daten – Fakten – Strukturen 1807–1932, Hohenkirchen/Obb. 1999. ISBN 3-927983-41-1
- Bernhard Schreiber: Die Sicherheitskräfte in der Republik Baden 1918–1933. Von der Volkswehr zur Einheitspolizei, Glottertal 2002. ISBN 3-00-009614-0
