= Law enforcement in Benin =

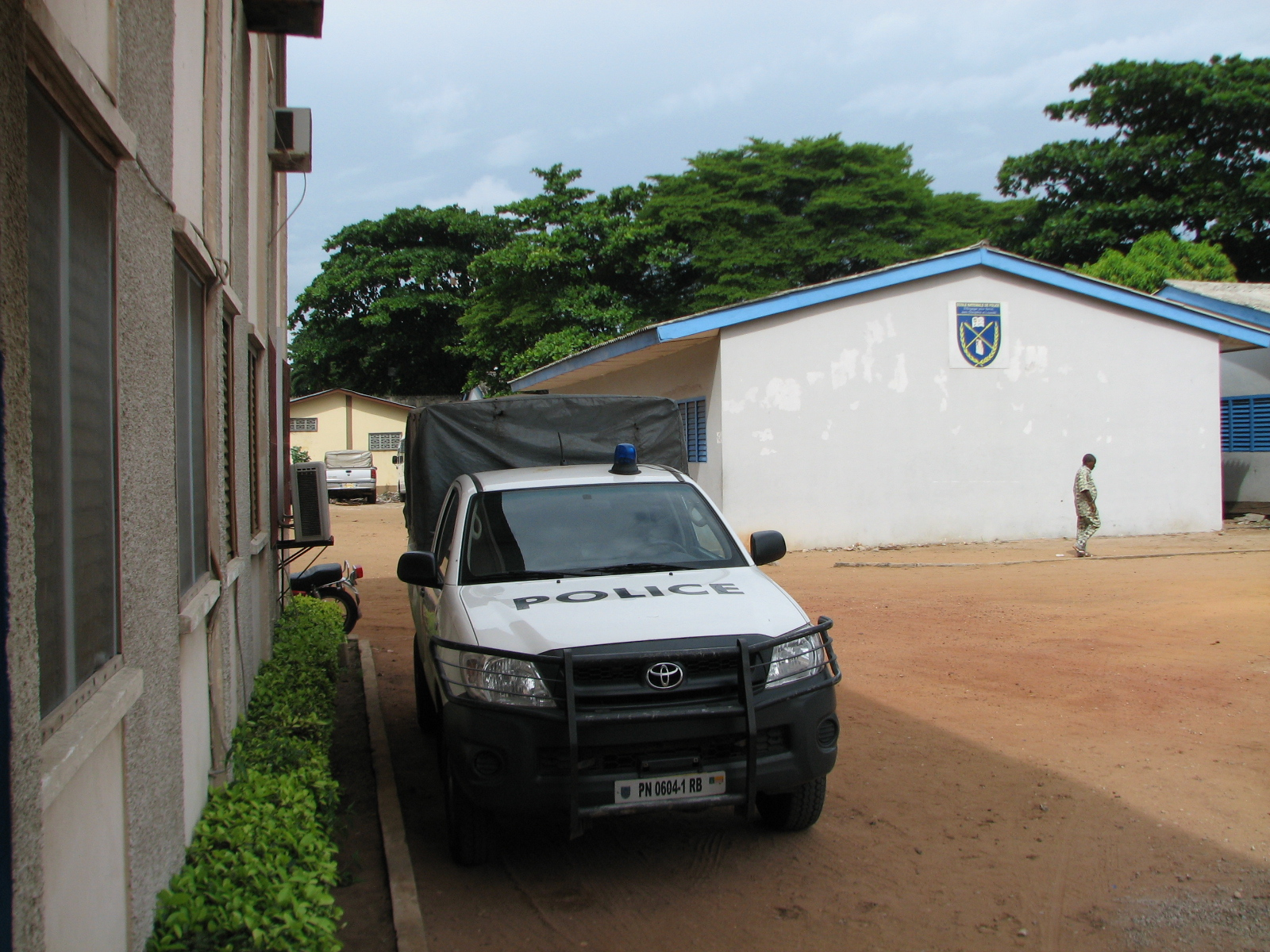
Courtyard of the Benin national police school, in the Zongo-Nima district of Cotonou.

As in many other countries with a French colonial heritage, law enforcement in Benin was a responsibility primarily shared by a military police gendarmerie and a civilian "National Police." However, in January 2018, these forces were merged into a single force called the Republican Police of Benin (Police Républicaine du Bénin).

== Former forces ==
The National Police (French: Police Nationale) was under the jurisdiction of the Ministry of the Interior, Public Security and Religious Affairs (MISPC, French: Ministère de l’Intérieur, de la Sécurité publique et des Cultes). The country was divided into six directions départementales. Police training was conducted at the national police school in Cotonou. The Gendarmerie nationale béninoise had both military and police roles. Due to its military status, the gendarmerie answered to the Ministry of Defence. It was headquartered in Porto-Novo. As a police force, it has administrative and judiciary police powers. It operated both in territorial units, responsible for defined areas, and mobile units. Overall, it had jurisdiction in nearly 90% of the country's territory.

== Other forces ==
In addition to the police, law enforcement is provided by several forces, including customs (les Douanes), game wardens (les Eaux et forêts) and the Unité mixte de contrôle des conteneurs (UMCC).

== Joint container inspection unit ==
The 'Unité mixte de contrôle des conteneurs includes staff from the Police, Douanes, and Eaux et forêts. Stationed in the harbour of Cotonou, it inspects containers in order to prevent the shipping of prohibited items such as drugs, weapons and counterfeit goods.

== Sources ==
1. World Police Encyclopedia, ed. by Dilip K. Das & Michael Palmiotto published by Taylor & Francis. 2004,
2. World Encyclopedia of Police Forces and Correctional Systems, second edition, Gale., 2006
3. Sullivan, Larry E. Encyclopedia of Law Enforcement. Thousand Oaks: Sage Publications, 2005.
