= Timeline of Antananarivo =

The following is a timeline of the history of the city of Antananarivo, Madagascar.

== Prior to 20th century ==
- 1610 – Antananarivo founded as capital of the Merina Kingdom by Andrianjaka and is the oldest city in Madagascar.
- 1710 – Capital of Merina Kingdom relocated to Ambohimanga from Antananarivo by Andriantsimitoviaminandriandrazaka.
- 1794 – Capital of Merina Kingdom relocated to Antananarivo from Ambohimanga by Andrianampoinimerina.
- 1800 – Population: 15,000 (approximate estimate).
- 1840 – Manjakamiadana built in the Rova of Antananarivo (palace).
- 1872 – British missionary church built.
- 1895
  - City besieged and captured by French forces during the Second Madagascar expedition.
  - French colonists rename city "Tananarive."
  - Population: 50,000-75,000 (approximate estimate).

== 20th century ==
- 1909 – Brickaville-Tananarive railway begins operating.
- 1910 – Soarano Station opens.
- 1913
  - Tamatave-Tananarive railway built.
  - Roman Catholic Apostolic Vicariate of Tananarive active.
- 1918 – Population: 63,115.
- 1923 – Antsirabe-Tananarive railway begins operating.
- 1925 – Botanical and Zoological Garden of Tsimbazaza founded.
- 1929 – Protests against French rule
- 1956 – City plan created.
- 1958 – National Congress Party for the Independence of Madagascar headquartered in city.
- 1959
  - Flood.
  - Richard Andriamanjato becomes mayor.
- 1960 – City becomes capital of the new Malagasy Republic.
- 1961 – University of Madagascar established.
- 1964 – Population: 298,813 city (estimate).
- 1971 – Population: 347,466 city; 377,600 urban agglomeration (estimate).
- 1972 – Political unrest; city hall burns down.
- 1976 – City renamed "Antananarivo."^{(fr)}
- 1983 – Midi Madagasikara newspaper begins publication.
- 1993 – Population: 710,236 city.
- 1995 – November: Rova of Antananarivo burns down.
- 1997 – 1997 Jeux de la Francophonie held in Antananarivo.

== 21st century ==
- 2001 – Senate building constructed (approximate date).
- 2002 – Civil war.
- 2005
  - Population: 1,015,140 city.
  - Meeting of the Association Internationale des Maires Francophones held in city.
- 2007 – December: Andry Rajoelina elected mayor.
- 2009 – January–February: 2009 Malagasy protests.
- 2015 – Lalao Ravalomanana becomes mayor.
- 2016
  - November: Meeting of the Organisation internationale de la Francophonie held in city.
  - December: Meeting of the Association des Villes et Collectivités de l’Ocean Indien held in city.
- 2018
  - April: Anti-government protest.
  - Population: 1,521,898 (estimate, urban agglomeration).
- 2022
  - January: 2022 Antananarivo floods
  - African Youth Games to be held in Antananarivo.

== See also ==
- Antananarivo history
- Timeline of Antananarivo (in French)
- List of mayors of Antananarivo

== Bibliography ==
in English

- Campbell, Gwyn (2012). David Griffiths and the Missionary "History of Madagascar". Leiden, the Netherlands: Brill. ISBN 978-90-04-20980-0.
- James Sibree (1896). "Antananarivo, the Capital". Madagascar Before the Conquest. New York: Macmillan.
- Sibree, James (1910). "Antanànarìvo" . Encyclopædia Britannica. Vol. 2 (11th ed.). p. 88.
- Cassandra Rachel Veney (2003). "Antananarivo, Madagascar". In Paul Tiyambe Zeleza; Dickson Eyoh (eds.). Encyclopedia of Twentieth-Century African History. Routledge. ISBN 978-0415234795.
- Ari Nave (2005). "Antananarivo, Madagascar". In Kwame Anthony Appiah and Henry Louis Gates (ed.). Africana: The Encyclopedia of the African and African American Experience (2nd ed.). Oxford University Press. p. 215. ISBN 978-0-19-517055-9.
- Faranirina Rajaonah (2005). "Antananarivo". In Kevin Shillington (ed.). Encyclopedia of African History. Fitzroy Dearborn. pp. 158–159. ISBN 978-1-57958-245-6.

in French

- Ch. Brossard, ed. (1906). "Madagascar: Villes principales: Tananarive". Colonies françaises. Géographie pittoresque et monumentale de la France (in French). Paris: Flammarion. hdl:2027/mdp.39015005579753 – via HathiTrust. (+ table of contents)
- Desmonts (2004). Madagascar (in French). New York: Editions Olizane. ISBN 978-2-88086-387-6.
- Charles Robequain [in French] (1949). "Une capitale montagnarde en pays tropical: Tananarive". Revue de géographie alpine (in French). 37 – via Persée.
- J. Ramamonjisoa (1983). "L'extension urbaine de Tananarive: nouveaux visages". Madagascar: Revue de Géographie (in French). 43. OCLC 470157888 – via MadaRevues.
- Faranirina V. Esoavelomandroso (1985). "Aménagement et occupation de l'espace dans la ville moyenne d'Antananarivo pendant la colonisation". Cahiers d'études africaines (in French). 25 – via Persée.
- Faranirina Esoavelomandroso-Rajaonah (1989), "Des rizieres a la ville les plaines de l'ouest d'Antananarivo dans la premiere moitie du XXeme siecle" [From rice fields to the city plains of western Antananarivo in the first half of the twentieth century] (PDF), Omaly sy Anio (in French), no. 29–32, OCLC 499639574 – via MadaRevues
- Marie Morelle (2006). "'La rue' dans la ville africaine (Yaoundé, Cameroun et Antananarivo, Madagascar" [City streets in Africa]. Annales de géographie (in French). 115 (650): 339–360. doi:10.3406/geo.2006.21445 – via Persee.fr.
- Catherine Fournet-Guerin (2007). Vivre à Tananarive: Géographie du changement dans la capitale malgache (in French). Éditions Karthala. ISBN 978-2-8111-4168-4.
- Juliette Grolée; Veronique Jenn-Treyer (2007). La précollecte des déchets à Antananarivo, Madagascar (PDF) (in French). Antananarivo: Enda Océan Indien.
- Helihanta Rajaonarison (2010). "L'essor de la photographie de studio à Antananarivo dans les années 1930" [Rise of studio photography in Antananarivo in the 1930s]. Études Océan Indien (in French). 44 (44): 99–120. doi:10.4000/oceanindien.574 – via Revues.org.
