= Guy Randrianarisoa =

Malagasy businessman and politician

Guy Rivo Randrianarisoa

Member of the National Assembly
- Incumbent
- Assumed office 18 February 2014
- Preceded by: Solofonantenaina Razoarimihaja
- Constituency: Antananarivo V

Mayor of Antananarivo Acting
- In office 3 February 2009 – March 2009
- Preceded by: Andry Rajoelina
- Succeeded by: Michèle Ratsivalaka

Personal details
- Born: 1962 (age 63–64) Antananarivo, Madagascar
- Party: Ravalomanana Movement

Guy Célin Rivoniaina Randrianarisoa (born 1962), often known as Guy Rivo Randrianarisoa, is a Malagasy businessman and politician. In February 2009, he was appointed Mayor of Antananarivo by President Marc Ravalomanana to replace Andry Rajoelina, who was removed from the office after declaring himself the leader of Madagascar. Since 2014, he has served as a member of the National Assembly.

== Biography ==
Randrianarisoa was born on 9 March 1962.

Randrianarisoa was secretary-general of the city of Antananarivo during the mayorships of Patrick Ramiaramanana and Hery Rafalimanana, he was secretary-general of the city, 2005 to 2008. When Andry Rajoelina was elected Mayor of Antananarivo in December 2007, Randrianarisoa became his special advisor. On 3 February 2009, Rajoelina declared himself leader of Madagascar. In response, President Marc Ravalomanana's Minister of the Interior announced Rajoelina's removal from office. He appointed Randrianarisoa as the provisional mayor and head of a special delegation to govern the city. Upon taking office, Randrianarisoa described himself as "a technician and not as a politician," noting that he was not a member of President Ravalomanana's Tiako I Madagasikara party. He served as mayor until March 2009, when Rajoelina assumed the presidency, replacing him with Michèle Ratsivalaka.

In the Malagasy general elections on 20 December 2013, Randrianarisoa was elected to the National Assembly for the Antananarivo V district. Previously an independent, he is now affiliated with the Ravalomanana Movement. He took office on 18 February 2014, and was considered in the running to be President of the National Assembly.

In June 2017, Randrianarisoa accompanied former President Marc Ravalomanana and his wife, Lalao Ravalomanana, on a trip to several Nordic countries, including Denmark, Sweden, and Norway. He told the newspaper La Vérité that the trip was not about fundraising, but about forming relations with other countries.
