= Andriamanjato =

Andriamanjato is a surname. Notable people with the surname include:

- Bao Andriamanjato (1929–1994), Malagasy politician and engineer, wife of Richard
- Ny Hasina Andriamanjato, Malagasy politician, son of Bao and Richard
- Richard Andriamanjato (1930–2013), Malagasy politician, husband of Bao
