= Communications in Madagascar =

Communications in Madagascar include newspapers, radio, television, fixed and mobile telephones, cinema, and the Internet.

Widespread poverty and illiteracy severely limit the penetration of television, print media, and the Internet, making radio by far the most important communications medium in the country.

== Newspapers ==
- L'Express de Madagascar, privately owned daily.
- Midi Madagasikara, privately owned daily.
- Madagascar Tribune, privately owned daily.
- La Gazette de la Grande Ile, privately owned daily.
- Lakroa (Cross), Catholic weekly.

=== Press freedom ===
While the constitution provides for freedom of the press, the ability of the press to criticize the regime is severely limited. In particular the absence of a communications code protecting press freedoms allows authorities to prosecute journalists under libel law and the criminal code whenever the content of their reporting offends the facto regime.

In November 2012 the de facto minister of communications stated that assertions harming the "general interest" were banned from public media. Gendarmes interrogated the editor-in-chief of Le Courrier de Madagascar for several hours in April 2012 after he ran a story entitled, "Governance--the Brothel Takes Hold at High Levels." Investigative journalists are often targets of threats and harassment from authorities. In May 2012 police stopped a journalist from La Verite, a pro-regime newspaper, on his way to cover an event in Antananarivo. Police reportedly beat him and broke his arm. All journalists released on bail remained subject to rearrest at any time.

== Radio and television ==
- Radio stations: State-owned Radio Nationale Malagasy (RNM) has an extensive national network reach; privately owned radio broadcasters in cities and major towns; state-run radio dominates in rural areas; relays of 2 international broadcasters are available in the capital, Antananarivo (2007).
  - Malagasy National Radio (RNM), state-owned.
  - Radio Don Bosco, Catholic.
  - Radio Lazan' Iarivo (RLI) (Glory of Iarivo), private.
  - Radio Antsiva, private.
- Radios: 3.05 million (1997).
- Television stations: Television Malagasy (TVM) has an extensive national network reach; privately owned TV broadcasters in cities and major towns; relays of 2 international broadcasters are available in Antananarivo (2007).
  - Televiziona Malagasy (TVM), state-owned.
  - Radio-Television Analamanga (RTA), privately owned.
  - Madagascar TV (MATV), privately owned.
- Television sets: 325,000 (1997).

Former president, Marc Ravalomanana, and current leader Andry Rajoelina own broadcasting outlets.

=== Media restrictions ===
Although the law provides for freedom of speech, authorities severely restrict freedom of speech by intimidating opponents and resorting to imprisonment or violence when threats fail to dissuade critics. The de facto minister of communications targeted those who expressed dissent, sending official warning letters to news outlets whose coverage displeased the regime. From 2010 through 2012 an estimated 80 radio and television station licenses withdrawn and the stations ordered suspend broadcasting immediately. By the end of 2012 they had not been authorized to reopen. In September 2012 the editor of the national television station was suspended, reportedly for having opposition politicians on the air. Authorities also suspend journalists who continue to broadcast despite government warnings. To maintain access to sources and remain safe, journalists widely practiced self-censorship.

On 2 May 2012, authorities imprisoned the editors of the private radio station Free FM, Lalatiana Rakotondrazafy and Fidel Razara Pierre, for a two-day investigation following a libel suit brought by Mamy Ravatomanga, a well-known backer of the de facto regime. Following a series of public rallies that same month marking the first anniversary of Free FM and calling for greater press freedom, the radio's editors were charged with provoking outrage against the regime, destruction of public goods, mounting opposition to security forces, and holding a public demonstration without authorization. On 22 July 2012, authorities closed the radio station, and the two journalists and another colleague went into hiding. By the end of 2012 Free FM remained closed. But after a deal consented with the two journalists and the regime, initiated by Mamy Ravatomanga, Lalatiana Rakotondrazafy is free and become the allied of the Rajoelina's regime.

=== Shortwave relay stations ===
In 2013, the government of Madagascar and Malagasy Global Business S.A. signed an agreement to operate the Madagascar relay station in Talata-Volonondry. Among its customers are Radio Netherlands Worldwide, NHK World-Japan, BBC World Service, Deutsche Welle, Vatican Radio, Adventist World Radio and Free Press Unlimited.

== Telephones ==
- Calling code: +261
- International call prefix: 00
- Main lines: 143,700 lines in use, 138th in the world (2012), provided by Telma (Telecom Malagasy)
- Mobile cellular: 8.6 million lines, 89th in the world (2012).
- Teledensity: 40 per 100 persons, combined fixed-line and mobile-cellular (2010).
- Telephone system: system is above average for the region, Antananarivo's main telephone exchange modernized in the late 1990s, but the rest of the analogue-based telephone system is poorly developed; open-wire lines, coaxial cables, microwave radio relay, and tropospheric scatter links (2010).
- Communications cables: two; Lower Indian Ocean Network (LION), connecting Madagascar, Réunion, and Mauritius; Eastern Africa Submarine Cable System (EASSy) connecting Sudan, Djibouti, Somalia, Kenya, Comoros, Tanzania, Madagascar, Mozambique, and South Africa.
- Satellite earth stations: 1 Intelsat (Indian Ocean) and 1 Intersputnik (Atlantic Ocean region) (2010).

== Internet ==
- Top-level domain: .mg
- Internet users: 452,185 users, 133rd in the world; 2.1% of the population, 201st in the world (2012).
- Fixed broadband: 9,242 subscriptions, 150th in the world; less than 0.05% of the population, 187th in the world (2012).
- Wireless broadband: Unknown (2012).
- Internet hosts: 38,392 hosts, 127th in the world (2012).
- IPv4: 62,208 addresses allocated, less than 0.05% of the world total, 2.8 addresses per 1000 people (2012).
- Internet service providers (ISPs):
  - As of 2006:
    - DTS, http://www.dts.mg/
    - Simicro, http://www.simicro.mg/
    - Blueline (Gulfsat), http://www.gulfsat.mg. In 2005 Blueline was the first operator in the Indian Ocean area to launch a Wimax based network for broadband Internet access.

=== Internet censorship and surveillance ===
There are generally no restrictions on access to the Internet, or reports that the de facto government monitors e-mail or Internet chat rooms. However, the de facto minister of communication made several statements throughout 2012 about restricting the Internet.

Political groups, parties, and activists use the Internet extensively to advance their agendas, share news, and criticize other parties. Although there have been allegations of technical sabotage of some Web sites, the Internet is considered among the more reliable sources of information, as many Internet servers were outside the country and cannot be regulated by the regime.

The constitution and law provide for freedom of speech and press, but the de facto regime and military actors actively and systematically impeded the exercise of freedoms of expression and of the press. The law prohibits arbitrary Interference with privacy, family, home, or correspondence, but homes and workplaces of opposition groups are subject to arbitrary searches without warrants. Regime security personnel also punished family members for alleged offenses committed by individuals.

==== Predator Files ====
In October 2023, Mediapart newspaper revealed that the Malagasy presidency acquired the Predator spyware in 2021 illegally and used it to spy on several political opponents, including the opposition newspaper, Roland Rasoamaharo, who was subsequently imprisoned. According to two technical investigations, Predator was also used by the Malagasy government during the 2023 elections.

An investigation by the Central Office for the Fight against Crimes Against Humanity, Genocides and War Crimes (OCLCH) established that the leaders of Nexa and Intellexa exported equipment and software to hack phones to the Malagasy presidency, without any authorization.

== See also ==
- Madagascar
- Economy of Madagascar
