= Hyppolite Ramaroson =

Malagasy vice admiral and politician (born 1951)

Vice Admiral Hyppolite Ramaroson

Acting President of Madagascar Head of the Military Directorate
- In office 17 March 2009 (several hours)
- Prime Minister: Vacant
- Preceded by: Marc Ravalomanana (as President of Madagascar)
- Succeeded by: Andry Rajoelina (as President of the High Transitional Authority)

Minister of Foreign Affairs of Madagascar
- In office 25 February 2010 – March 2011
- President: Andry Rajoelina
- Prime Minister: Albert Camille Vital
- Preceded by: Ny Hasina Andriamanjato
- Succeeded by: Yvette Sylla

Vice Prime Minister of Madagascar
- In office 25 February 2010 – March 2011 Serving with Hajo Andrianainarivelo and Botozaza Pierrot
- President: Andry Rajoelina
- Prime Minister: Albert Camille Vital
- Preceded by: Ny Hasina Andriamanjato
- Succeeded by: Yvette Sylla

Personal details
- Born: 28 September 1951 (age 74) Antananarivo, French Madagascar
- Spouse: Joelle Jacky Rajao
- Children: 3

Military service
- Allegiance: Madagascar
- Branch/service: Aeronaval Force
- Rank: Vice admiral

Vice Admiral Hippolite Rarison Ramaroson (born 28 September 1951) is a Malagasy vice admiral and politician. During the 2009 Malagasy political crisis and after President Marc Ravalomanana stepped down, he served as acting President of Madagascar as “Head of the Military Directorate” for several hours on 17 March 2009, before transferring power to Andry Rajoelina. He was Minister of Foreign Affairs and one of three Vice Prime Ministers in the High Transitional Authority from 2010 to 2011.

== Early life ==
Ramaroson was born on 28 September 1951 in Tananarive (Antananarivo), then the capital of French Madagascar.

== Career ==
Ramaroson joined the Madagascar Armed Forces, enlisting in the Aeronaval Force, which includes both Madagascar's navy and air force. He rose to the rank of vice admiral.

=== Acting President of Madagascar ===
On 17 March 2009, after months of intense protests, President Marc Ravalomanana resigned. He left a signed note in which he assigned power to Ramaroson as head of the new "military directorate." As a result, Ramaroson served as acting President of Madagascar for several hours on that day. The military leadership called Ravalomanana's action a "ploy" and supported opposition leader Andry Rajoelina. In a ceremony broadcast from a military camp in Antananarivo, Ramaroson and two generals announced that they were ending the military directorate and installing Rajoeline in power. He said in the video, "We have categorically rejected the [military] authority that Ravalomanana asked us to set up after his resignation."

=== Later career ===
On 24 February 2010, Ramaroson was appointed Vice Prime Minister and Minister of Foreign Affairs by President Rajoelina. He took possession of his offices the next morning, 25 February. He succeeded Ny Hasina Andriamanjato, who resigned earlier that month because he was "convince there would be no international recognition of Rajoelina unless he formed a unity government before elections. He became foreign minister at a time when foreign nations were concerned with the new administration's legitimacy and commitment to democracy, and the African Union's threat of sanctions should a power-sharing agreement not be in force by mid-March. Ramaroson told Reuters on the day of his appointment, "My principal mission is to explain to the international community what really happened in Madagascar. I will also talk to our ambassadors so they work for the country."

The Madagascar Tribune noted that Ramaroson caused some embarrassment for the president when he announced his appointment as deputy prime minister and foreign minister to the press before the High Transitional Authority had even done so. In addition, the Tribune speculated that Ramaroson's status as a vice admiral in the armed forces could be a source of embarrassment, given that he, as Deputy Prime Minister, outranked Prime Minister Albert Camille Vital, a colonel.

At the United Nations General Assembly in 2010, Madagascar was the only country not to make an address. The reason cited were the events of the 2009 General Assembly, in which a majority of African countries voted to prevent President Rajoelina from speaking. Ramaroson explained to Reuters, "We didn't want a repeat of that... It's not worth squabbling in this General Assembly. That's why we decided not to speak... No one told us to pull out."

Ramaroson stepped down as Vice Prime Minister and Foreign Minister in March 2011.

== Personal life ==
Ramaroson is married to Joelle Jacky Rajao. They have three children, Hary, Tantely, and Geraldine.

== See also ==
- List of presidents of Madagascar

Political offices
Preceded by Marc Ravalomanana as President of Madagascar	Acting President of Madagascar; Head of the Military Directorate; 2009	Succeeded by Andry Rajoelina as President of the High Transitional Authority
