= First Lady of Madagascar =

Position in Madagascar

- Incumbent; Elisa Randrianirina since October 14, 2025
- Residence: Iavoloha Palace
- Inaugural holder: Justine Tsiranana
- Formation: June 26, 1960
- Website: First Lady of Madagascar

First Lady of Madagascar (French: Première Dame du Madagascar) is the title attributed to the wife of the president of Madagascar. There have been no first gentlemen of Madagascar to date.

== First ladies of Madagascar ==
Name	Portrait	Term Began	Term Ended	President of Madagascar	Notes
Justine Tsiranana		June 26, 1960	October 11, 1972	Philibert Tsiranana	Born Justine Kalitody, Tsiranana was the inaugural First Lady of Madagascar. She married Philibert Tsiranana on January 29, 1933, at a ceremony in the village of Antsirabe, Mandritsara District.
Marcelle Larguier		October 11, 1972	February 5, 1975	Gabriel Ramanantsoa	Marcelle Larguier married Ramanantsoa at a Catholic ceremony in Faravohitra on May 26, 1934.
Thérèse Ratsimandrava		February 5, 1975	February 11, 1975	Richard Ratsimandrava	Born Thérèse Razafindramoizina, she married Colonel Richard Ratsimandrava on September 22, 1956. The couple had five children. Her husband became head of the military government on February 5, 1975. Ratsimandrava was first lady just six days before Colonel Ratsimandrava's assassination on February 11, 1975. Thérèse Ratsimandrava died in August 2001.
Unknown		February 12, 1975	June 15, 1975	Gilles Andriamahazo	General Gilles Andriamahazo was the transitional president of the military government following Ratsimandrava's assassination. He never appeared with his wife in public during his short tenure.
Céline Ratsiraka		June 15, 1975	March 27, 1993	Didier Ratsiraka	The country's longest tenured first lady, Ratsiraka was born Céline Velonjara. In 1964, she married a young naval officer, Didier Ratsiraka, in a Catholic ceremony. They have four children - Olga, Annick, Xavier, and Sophie.
Thérèse Zafy		March 27, 1993	September 5, 1996	Albert Zafy	Born Thérèse Auguste Zafimahova, she was the wife of President Albert Zafy. The couple had three children. Former President Zafy died in October 2017.
Sahondra Rakotondravaly Ratsirahonana		September 5, 1996	February 9, 1997	Norbert Ratsirahonana	Born Sahondra Rakotondravaly, she was the wife of interim president Norbert Ratsirahonana. Rakotondravaly died in Réunion on April 23, 2014.
Céline Ratsiraka		February 9, 1997	May 6, 2002	Didier Ratsiraka	Céline Ratsiraka's second tenure as first lady
Lalao Ravalomanana		May 6, 2002	March 17, 2009	Marc Ravalomanana	Lalao Ravalomanana married her husband, Marc Ravalomanana, in 1974. In April 2013, shortly after returning from exile in South Africa, Lalao Ravalomanana announced her candidacy in the 2013 presidential election. However, Lalao Ravalomanana was barred from running for not having lived in Madagascar for 6 months before the poll In 2015, she was elected Mayor of Antananarivo.
Mialy Rajoelina		March 17, 2009	January 25, 2014	Andry Rajoelina	Born Mialy Razakandisa, she met Andry Rajoelina in 1994 while completing her senior year at a high school in Antananarivo. The couple dated long-distance for six years while she completed her undergraduate and masters studies in Paris. The couple married in 2000.
Voahangy Rajaonarimampianina		January 25, 2014	September 7, 2018	Hery Rajaonarimampianina	The couple married at a ceremony held at the Ambohinaorina Church of Jesus Christ in Madagascar (FJKM) in Sabotsy Namehana.
Married		September 7, 2018	January 19, 2019	Rivo Rakotovao (acting)	
Mialy Rajoelina		January 19, 2019	September 9, 2023	Andry Rajoelina	
Married		September 9, 2023	October 27, 2023	Christian Ntsay (acting)	
Lydie Sahondraniaina Rabarison		October 27, 2023	December 16, 2023	Richard Ravalomanana (acting)	Rabarison is from Ambatolampy Gara. She is a research officer at the National Archives of Madagascar.
Mialy Rajoelina		December 16, 2023	October 14, 2025	Andry Rajoelina	
Elisa Randrianirina		October 14, 2025	Incumbent	Michael Randrianirina	
