= Tsiranana =

Tsiranana may refer to:

== People ==
- Justine Tsiranana (c. 1918 – July 1999), the first First Lady of Madagascar
- Philibert Tsiranana, first President of Madagascar
- Ruffine Tsiranana, a Malagasy Senator

== Places ==
- Amborovy Airport, also known as Philibert Tsiranana Airport
