= List of newspapers in Madagascar =

The following is a list of newspapers and news publications in Madagascar. Most are headquartered in the city of Antananarivo. As of the mid-1960s, there were "18 dailies, 48 weeklies, 60 monthlies, 10 bimonthlies, and 19 quarterlies" in publication.

== Current publications ==
Newspaper	First issued	Frequency	Language	Notes
L'Écho du Sud	1929	Weekly	French	Owned by Ferber Enterprises
Ao Raha		Daily	Malagasy	
Basy Vava	1959		Malagasy	
Le Citoyen		Daily	French or French/Malagasy	
Dans les Médias Demain		Weekly	French or French/Malagasy	
La Dépêche		Daily	French or French/Malagasy	
L'Express de Madagascar	1995	Daily	French or French/Malagasy	
Essentielle Madagascar		Monthly	French or French/Malagasy	
Expansion		Monthly	French or French/Malagasy	
Femin@		Monthly	French or French/Malagasy	
Free news		Daily	French or French/Malagasy	
Gazetiko		Daily	Malagasy	Owned by Midi Madagasikara S.A.
Gazetinao	1976	Monthly	French or French/Malagasy	
La Gazette de la Grande Île		Daily	French or French/Malagasy	
L'Hebdo de l'Express de Madagascar		Weekly	French or French/Malagasy	
Imongo Vaovao	1955		Malagasy	Issued by the Congress Party for the Independence of Madagascar
Jejoo			Malagasy	
Lakroan’i Madagasikara	1927	Weekly	French or French/Malagasy	
La Ligne de mire		Daily	French or French/Malagasy	
Mada-Journal		Monthly	French or French/Malagasy	
Madagascar Laza		Daily	French or French/Malagasy	
Madagascar Magazine		Quarterly	French or French/Malagasy	
Madagascar Matin	1972	Daily	French or French/Malagasy	
Madagascar Santé Hebdo - Gazetin'ny Fahasalamana		Weekly	French or French/Malagasy	
Madagascar Tribune		Daily	French or French/Malagasy	
Malaza		Weekly	Malagasy	
Maresaka	1953		Malagasy	
Midi flash - Midi Maikala			Malagasy	
Midi Madagasikara	1983	Daily	French or French/Malagasy	
La Nation		Daily	French or French/Malagasy	
New Magazine		Bi-monthly	French	
Newsmada				
NGAH			Malagasy	
No Comment	2009	Monthly	French or French/Malagasy	Magazine
Les Nouvelles		Daily	French or French/Malagasy	
L'Observateur		Daily	French or French/Malagasy	
Primababy		Monthly	French or French/Malagasy	
Prime magazine		Monthly	French or French/Malagasy	
La Revue de l’Océan Indien	1980	Monthly	French or French/Malagasy	
SOA		Weekly	Malagasy	
Takoritsika			Malagasy	
Tana Planète		Monthly	French or French/Malagasy	
Taratra		Daily	Malagasy	
TeloNohorefy		Biweekly	Malagasy	
Tia Tanindrazana		Daily	Malagasy	
Triatra			Malagasy	
La Tribune de Diego		Monthly	French or French/Malagasy	
Ny Valosoa Vaovao		Tri-weekly	French or French/Malagasy	
La Vérité		Daily	French or French/Malagasy	
Vintsy		Quarterly	French or French/Malagasy	
Watsa		Monthly	French or French/Malagasy	

== Defunct ==
- L'Aurore (weekly published in Mahajanga); defunct?
- Le Colon (in French)
- Courrier de Madagascar (est. 1962); defunct?
- L'Echo de Madagascar (est. 1900, in French)
- L'Echo du Sud (in French)
- L'Echo de Tananarive (in French)
- Fanilo (Catholic weekly published in Fianarantsoa); defunct?
- Ny Gazety Malagasy (government publication, est. 1883)
- KITRA
- Lumiere (Catholic weekly published in Fianarantsoa); defunct?
- Madagascar News (in English)
- Madagascar Times (in English)
- Madagascar World (in English)
- Madecasse (in French)
- Ny Mizana (monthly published in Toamasina); defunct?
- Le Phare de Majunga (in French)
- Le Quotidien
- Vaovao (est. 1900, in French)
- Ny VAOVAOntsika (daily)

== See also ==
- List of radio stations in Madagascar
- Telecommunications in Madagascar
- Online media of Madagascar (in French)
- Literature of Madagascar

== Bibliography ==
- Virginia Thompson; Richard Adloff (1965). "Malagasy Literature and Information Media". Malagasy Republic: Madagascar Today. Stanford University Press. pp. 228+. ISBN 978-0-8047-0279-9.
- "Madagascar: Directory: the Press". Africa South of the Sahara 2004. Regional Surveys of the World. Europa Publications. 2004. p. 650. ISBN 1857431839.
- "Madagascar", Freedom of the Press, US: Freedom House, 2015, OCLC 57509361
