= 2010 Malagasy constitutional referendum =

- 17 November 2010
- Do you accept the draft constitution to proceed with the Fourth Republic?

Results
Choice	Votes	%
Yes	2,657,962	74.19%
No	924,592	25.81%
Valid votes	3,582,554	95.23%
Invalid or blank votes	179,423	4.77%
Total votes	3,761,977	100.00%
Registered voters/turnout	7,151,223	52.61%

A constitutional referendum was held in Madagascar on 17 November 2010, in which voters approved a proposal for the state's fourth Constitution. The Malagasy people were asked to answer "Yes" or "No" to the proposed new constitution, which was considered to help consolidate Andry Rajoelina's grip on power. At the time of the referendum, Rajoelina headed the governing Highest Transitional Authority (HAT), an interim junta established following the military-backed coup d'état against then President Marc Ravalomanana in March 2009.

== Background ==
Rajoelina was inaugurated as transitional president on 17 March 2009 following a military-backed coup led by Colonel Charles Andrianasoavina against Marc Ravalomanana. He then scheduled the referendum over a new constitution.

The plebiscite was seen as a test of confidence in Rajoelina and a key element by him to legitimise his government.

== Scheduled date ==
The date was initially set for September 2009, with presidential elections in October 2010. This was later postponed to October 2009 before being cancelled. Then, a new referendum was set for 12 August 2010; on 29 June 2010, however, the referendum was indefinitely postponed yet again. Finally, on 14 August, a new date of 17 November was announced.

== New constitution ==
One change in the new constitution sought to keep the leader of the HAT (a position held by Rajoelina) as interim president until an election could take place. Analysts said this could allow Rajoelina to remain in power indefinitely, "because he's set no date for stepping down, nor spelled out conditions for the next elections."

The next presidential election was scheduled to be held in September 2011 (originally May 2011). Rajoelina has declared he has no intention of contesting the election. However, an amendment in the new constitution would lower the eligibility age to run for president from 40 to 35 years, allowing the 36-year-old Rajoelina to stand should he choose.

The proposed constitution also contains a clause that requires presidential candidates to have lived in Madagascar for at least six months prior to the elections, effectively barring Ravalomanana and other opposition leaders, who were living in exile in South Africa, from running in the election.

== Controversy ==
Madagascar's three main political parties: Tiako i Madagasikara, AREMA, and AVI, each headed by a former president, called for a boycott of the election. The boycotts came in protest over Rajoelina's refusal to form a power-sharing government in accordance with a pact drawn up and signed by Rajoelina himself in August 2010. They also criticised the change of electoral rules in the middle of the voting process.

Regional organisations, most prominently the African Union and the Southern Africa Development Community (SADC), criticised the lack of inclusivity in the HAT's transition process, and have demanded a return to negotiations.

The day before the poll there were minor disturbances in the capital Antananarivo.

== Referendum ==
Just over 7 million people (7,051,809) in total were registered to vote. During the voting process, the government also decided to "soften regulations" for young people who had reached the voting age but were not yet registered on the electoral roll. The day was declared a public holiday to encourage voters to go to the polls.

The National Independent Electoral Commission (CENI) reported a low voter turn-out, which officials attributed to multiple errors on the electoral list that omitted almost half of previously registered voters. After receiving complaints about this from voters, the executive closed the polls at 18:00 instead of 16:00, resulting in an increase of the number of voters in the afternoon.

After 99% of votes were cast, 74.13% approved the ballot with a turnout of 53%.

Malagasy constitutional referendum, 2010
Choice	Votes	%
For	2,657,962	74.19
Against	924,592	25.81
Total	3,582,554	100.00
Valid votes	3,582,554	95.23
Invalid/blank votes	179,423	4.77
Total votes	3,761,977	100.00
Registered voters/turnout	7,151,223	52.61

The new constitution was promulgated on 11 December 2010, starting the Fourth Republic of Madagascar.

=== Coup attempt ===
On election day, reports indicated that 21 military officers had taken control of the country. Colonel Charles Andrianasoavina, who had also backed the previous coup that brought Rajoelina to power, was the lead colonel who made the declaration saying the government had been dissolved. He was also joined by the presidential head of security. Andrianasoavina later said that he planned to seize the presidential palace as well as the country's main airport. They said all government institutions had been suspended and a military council would govern. They demanded the release of all political prisoners and the return of all leaders in exile, among them Ravalomanana.

The military leadership vowed to crush any rebellion, as Andrianazary, a military police general, was reported to have said he would not intervene "if there is a mutiny...[because] we cannot negotiate with someone who mutinies." The whereabouts of Rajoelina were not known, though the referendum votes appeared to be continuing.

The following day, the army chief, General Andre Ndriarijoana, met the rebellious soldiers, however no conclusive statement was made. Security forces also fired teargas to disperse crowds near the area. Three days after the coup, security forces attacked the base, and, following a brief firefight, the rebel soldiers surrendered.

The military had seen rifts within after the 2009 coup and scrapping of the old constitution. Additionally, Rajoelina's inability to consolidate leadership and end leadership had allegedly seen his popularity diminish.
