= Ambohitsorohitra Palace =

Official residence of the president of Madagascar

Coordinates: 18.9117°S 47.5245°E

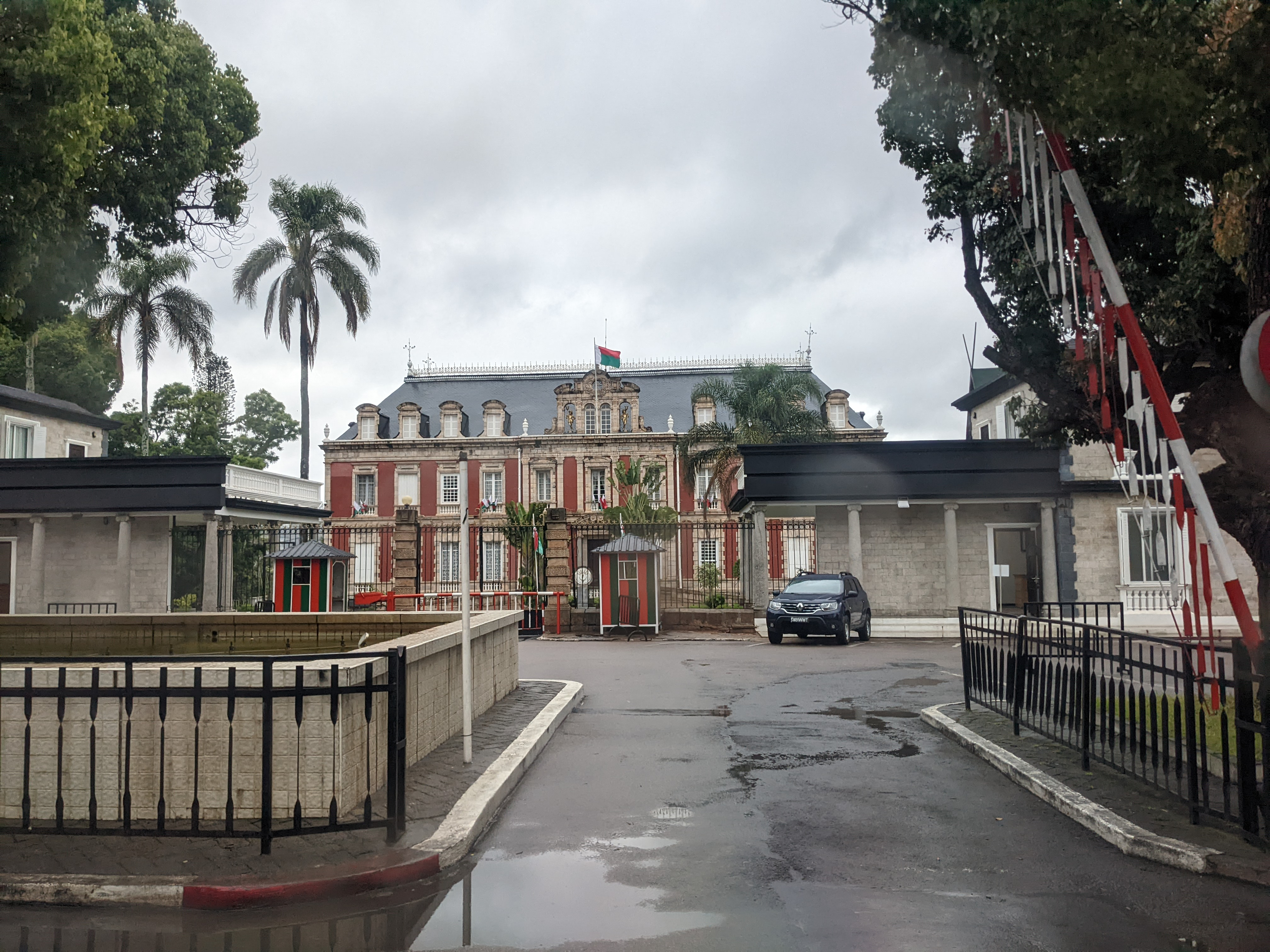
The Ambohitsorohitra Palace in 2023.

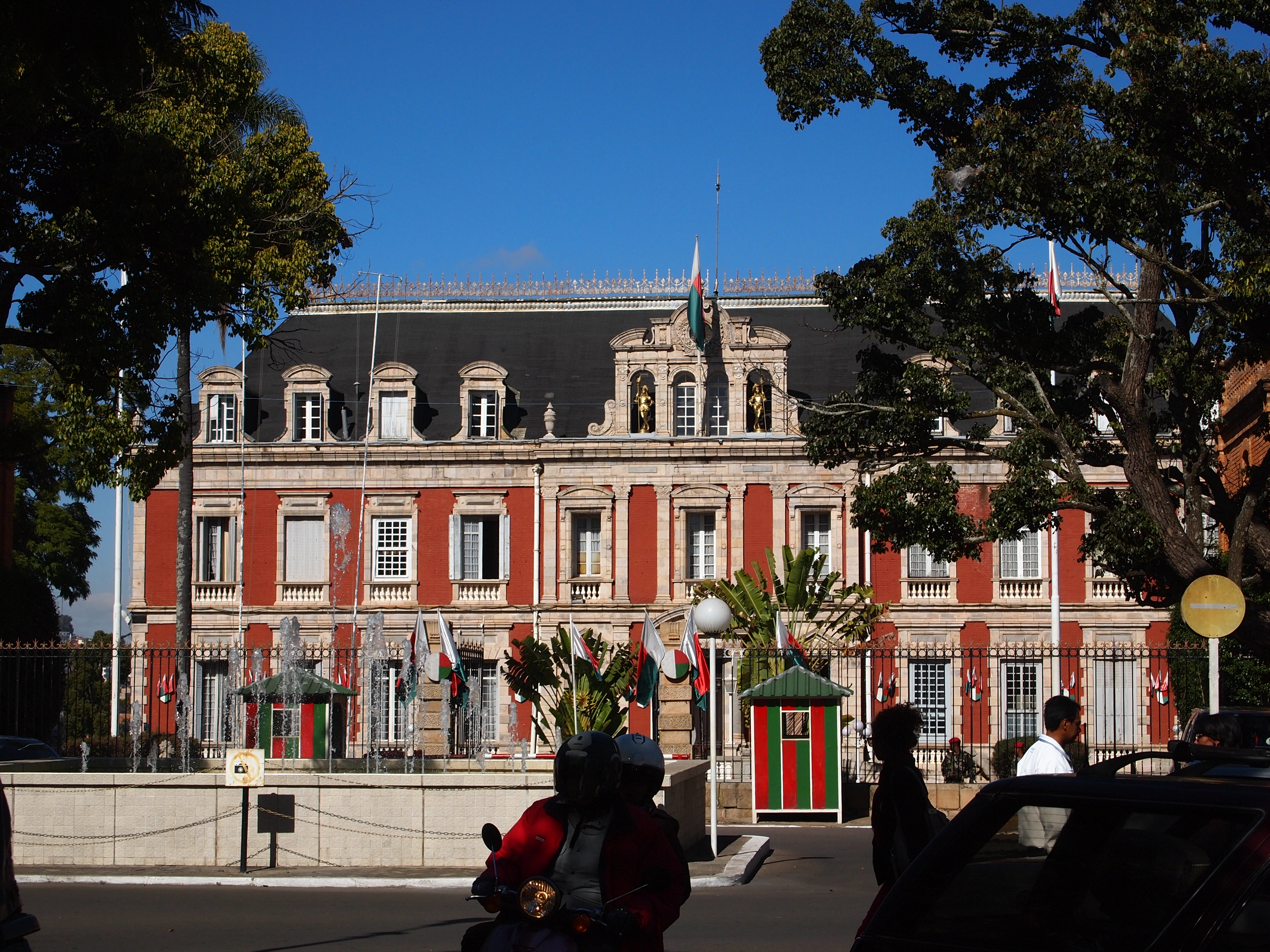
Detail of presidential office in the Ambohitsorohitra Palace.

The Ambohitsorohitra Palace is a presidential palace in the capital of Madagascar, Antananarivo. It has only a symbolic role and is not a residence of the president.

The palace was built between 1890 and 1892 by the French architect Jully in order to house the office and the residence of the colonial governor of French Madagascar. The palace is built in the French neo-Renaissance style using bricks and stone and was officially inaugurated on 14 July 1892, the National Day of France.

== Political events ==
During a coup between Marc Ravalomanana and Andry Rajoelina on March 16, 2009, the military took over the palace. The military threatened to do so again during a failed coup in November 2010.

== See also ==
- Iavoloha Palace
- Rova of Antananarivo
