= Gisèle Rabesahala =

Malagasy politician and activist

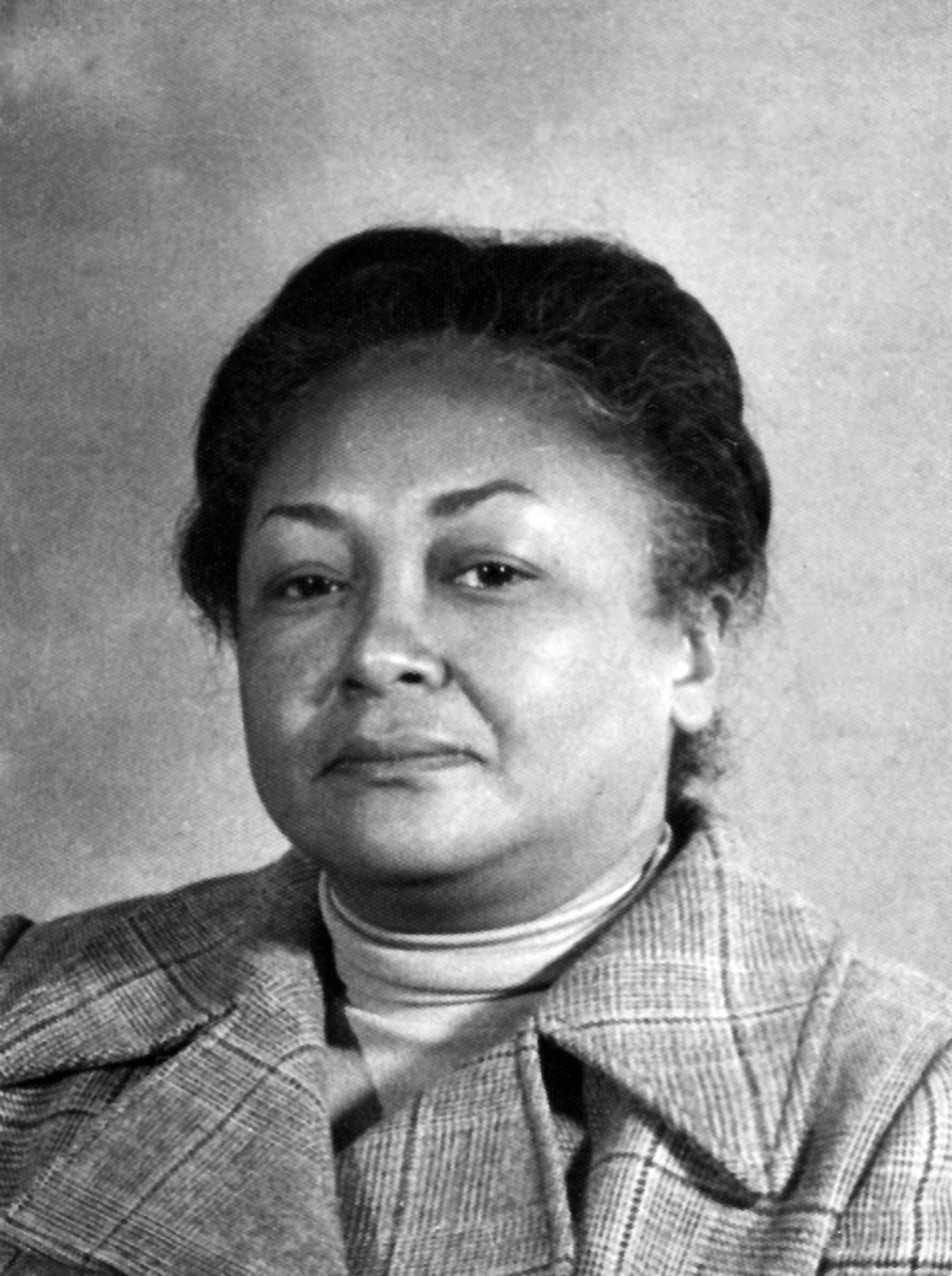
Gisèle Rabesahala

Marie Gisèle Aimée Rabesahala (7 May 1929 – 27 June 2011) was a Malagasy politician and activist who was the first woman to hold a ministerial position in the government of Madagascar. She entered politics at the age of 17, campaigning on behalf of political prisoners, and becoming Madagascar's first woman municipal councilor, before becoming the first Malagasy woman to establish and lead a political party. She was a committed Marxist and co-founded the communist Congress Party for the Independence of Madagascar, which took power in 1975. In 1977, she became Madagascar's first female minister, responsible for promoting revolutionary art and culture, but lost her job in 1991 when her ministry was abolished in the course of Madagascar's return to multi-party democracy. She remained an active political campaigner and journalist until her death in 2011.

== Early life and start of political career ==
She was born into a politically active family in the central highland city of Antananarivo, the capital of Madagascar. Her father was a non-commissioned officer in the French army, so her childhood saw the family moving between his postings in France, Tunisia and Mali. They moved back to Madagascar in 1942 when he died. She had aspired to become a nun in her childhood, but she took advantage of the opportunity, which few Malagasy women had at the time, to have a full education. She is regarded as a pioneer in Malagasy politics and obtained work as a shorthand typist and became involved in the 1950s with Malagasy nationalist circles, at the age of 17.

Rabesahala became the secretary general of the Comité de Solidarité Malgache (Malagasy Solidity Committee), an organisation created in the following day of the events that bloodied Madagascar, still under colonial administration. At the time, the objectives of the association were to create a broad movement of solidarity that worked to defend the victims of French colonial repression following the 1947 Malagasy Uprising. The success was the culmination of nine years of uninterrupted struggle for justice, freedom and national dignity, which was joined by people of heart in France and throughout the world. In 1960, when independence was regained, the association changed its focus to development activities, giving priority to the fields of education and health, in addition to helping the most destitute and the victims of natural disasters. She worked to secure the freedom of thousands of prisoners, writing articles for the press and attracting international attention to their plight. She liaised with left-wing members of the French National Assembly to organize petitions to the French President, Vincent Auriol, while her Solidarity Committee worked to provide support to the families of the prisoners to help them cope with the hardships that they were experiencing.

Rabesahala became the first Malagasy woman to be elected as a municipal councilor in 1956 and was also the first woman to become the leader of a Malagasy political party, the Union of the Malagasy People, which she founded in 1956. She also served on the executive of the Malagasy labour union FISEMA, an affiliate of the French communist General Confederation of Labour, and served on the editorial board of Imongo Vaovao, a nationalist newspaper that took a fiercely Opposition stance to French colonial rule in Madagascar; she retained this position until 2011. Her views were unequivocally Marxist as well as nationalist. In 1958 she was a co-founder of the Congress Party for the Independence of Madagascar (AKFM), uniting five nationalist organisations.

== Career in office ==
In 1975, fifteen years after Madagascar's independence from France, the AKFM took power and established the socialist-Marxist Democratic Republic of Madagascar (DRM). Rabesahala represented the AKFM on the National Front for the Defense of the Revolution, a coalition of six Marxist-oriented political parties. She also represented her hometown of Antananarivo as a deputy in the National Assembly. In 1977, she became Madagascar's first female minister and served as minister for revolutionary art and culture until 1989, and as minister of culture from 1989 to 1991.

She left office in August 1991 when the incoming government of Guy Razanamasy abolished her ministry as part of a transition to multi-party democracy. By that time the AKFM had split between communist hardliners and reformists, with the latter supporting democratic reforms. Rabesahala remained with the rump of the AKFM, which had joined forces with the DRM's former president Didier Ratsiraka under the umbrella of the Militant Movement for Malagasy Socialism in 1990. Ratsiraka's bid to become president in the 1993 elections failed and the AKFM did not win a single legislative seat.

Rabesahala opposed the new government of Albert Zafy through journalism and pamphleteering, and when Ratsiraka returned to power in the 1997 election she again returned to political prominence. She advised Prime Minister Pascal Rakotomavo but resigned in 1998 after the AKFM again failed to win any seats and the administration had adopted a strategy of liberal market reforms. She worked behind the scenes to build a multi-party coalition to support President Ratsiraka and was appointed by him as a senator and one of six vice-presidents. When Marc Ravalomanana took power in 2002, she became a consistent voice of opposition to what she saw as foreign intervention and neoliberalism in his policies.

She never married and had no children, saying that she preferred to "serve my country, rather than one person". She died on 27 June 2011.

In a speech to Madagascar's parliamentarians, UN Secretary-General Ban Ki-Moon praised her:

The late Gisèle Rabesahala was a great daughter of Madagascar and an example to the world. She went into politics when she was just 17. She struggled against colonialism and advocated for the poor. She became the first woman Minister in Madagascar. She once said, “If we don’t know where we come from, we don’t know where we are going.” I encourage you to heed these words, learn from your history and build a better future for all.
