= Patrick Ramiaramanana =

Malagasy politician

Patrick Xavier Heriniaina Ramiaramanana is a Malagasy politician. He was Mayor of Antananarivo, the capital of Madagascar, before serving in the government from 2007 to 2008.

Ramiaramanana began working at Marc Ravalomanana's dairy company, TIKO, in 1997, holding positions in management. Ravalomanana won the disputed December 2001 presidential election, and Ramiaramanana was named President of the Special Delegation of Antananarivo to replace Ravalomanana, who had been the city's mayor. He was appointed chairman of the board of the state electricity and water company, Jirama, in October 2003, and soon afterward, on October 16, he publicly announced his anticipated candidacy for Mayor of Antananarivo. As the candidate of the ruling Tiako I Madagasikara (TIM), was elected mayor in the municipal election held on November 23, 2003; his victory had been expected. In 2006 he was the tenth-placed finalist for World Mayor. He stepped down as mayor when he was appointed as Minister of Energy in the government of Prime Minister Charles Rabemananjara named on January 25, 2007.

Ramiaramanana ran as a TIM candidate for a seat in the National Assembly of Madagascar from the Antananarivo I constituency in the September 2007 parliamentary election and, along with his fellow TIM candidate for the constituency, Arinosy Jacques Razafimbelo, he won by a large margin with 61.21% of the vote, according to provisional results.

Following the election, in the government named on October 27, 2007, Ramiaramanana was moved from his position as Minister of Energy to that of Minister of Sports, Culture, and Leisure. He was suspended from this post in the government named on April 30, 2008; Jean-Louis Robinson replaced Ramiaramanana in an interim capacity before being formally appointed to head the ministry in June 2008.

Political offices
Preceded by Marc Ravalomanana	Mayor of Antananarivo; 2003–2007	Succeeded by Andry Rajoelina
