= Céline Ratsiraka =

Malagasy politician (1938–2025)

First Lady of Madagascar
- In role 9 February 1997 – 6 May 2002
- President: Didier Ratsiraka
- Preceded by: Sahondra Ratsirahonana
- Succeeded by: Lalao Ravalomanana
- In role 15 June 1975 – 27 March 1993
- President: Didier Ratsiraka
- Preceded by: Thérèse Ratsimandrava
- Succeeded by: Thérèse Zafy

Personal details
- Born: Céline Marthe Velonjara; 30 January 1938 French Madagascar
- Died: 22 August 2025 (aged 87) Antananarivo, Madagascar
- Party: AREMA
- Spouse: Didier Ratsiraka (m. 1964; died 2021)
- Children: 4

Céline Marthe Ratsiraka (née Velonjara; 30 January 1938 – 22 August 2025) was a Malagasy politician, political figure and wife of former President Didier Ratsiraka. She was the longest tenured First Lady of Madagascar in the country's history, having held the position from 1975 to 1993 and from 1997 until 2002. She was an influential figure within the ruling Association for the Rebirth of Madagascar (AREMA) from the 1970s to the 1990s, especially within the party's left-wing.

== Biography ==
Ratsiraka was born on 30 January 1938. She was the daughter of Pascal Velonjara, a parliamentarian during the French colonial period and founder of the Parti des déshérités de Madagascar (PADESM).

In 1964, she married Didier Ratsiraka, at the time a young naval officer, at a Catholic ceremony presided over by Father Armand Gaëtan Razafindratandra. The couple had four children: three daughters—Olga, Sophie, Annick—and one son, Xavier.

Didier Ratsiraka took power in 1975 as President of the Supreme Revolutionary Council. During the rule of her husband from 1975 until 1993, Céline Ratsiraka became an influential figure in Malagasy politics and the regime's AREMA party as first lady and wife of the president. Céline Ratsiraka and her sister, Hortense Raveloson Mahasampo, led the left wing of the AREMA party, which acted as a counterbalance to figures within the party's right flank, such as Pascal Rakotomavo and Rakotovao Razakaboana. Ratsiraka and her sister also organized and led the party's women's wing, known as AREMA Women. Additionally, Céline Ratsiraka also headed AREMA's cooperative movement, including an investment bureau called the PROCOOP.

Didier and Céline Ratsiraka went into exile in France in July 2002, ending a seven month political crisis following the disputed 2001 presidential election between Ratsiraka and the eventual winner, Marc Ravalomanana.

In April 2013, the Ratsirakas returned to Madagascar after living in exile in France for eleven years so her husband could contest the 2013 presidential election. Didier Ratsiraka was removed from the race by the electoral court in August 2013 for missing the six-month residency deadline.

On 22 March 2021, both Céline Ratsiraka and her husband were admitted to Soavinandriana Military Hospital (CENHOSOA) in Antananarivo, for treatment of a "small flu", according to their relatives. Didier Ratsiraka died at the hospital from cardiac arrest several days later on 28 March 2021, at the age of 84. Céline Ratsiraka died on 22 August 2025, at the age of 87.

== Awards ==
- First Class of Order of the National Flag (North Korea, 1978)
