= Honoré N. Razafindramiandra =

Malagasy politician (1939-1996)

Honoré N. Razafindramiandra (23 August 1939 - 29 April 1996) was a Malagasy politician. Born in Ampitatafika, Antanifotsy, he was an activist of the Vital Forces Committee known as Commité des Forces Vives. He served as Vice-President of the Forces Vives Committee in 1991 and as Vice-President of the High State Authority under the Transitional Government until 1993. Founder of the Political party Accord (Actions des Chrétiens Cadres et Opérateurs de tous les Régions pour le Développement) and Director and founder of two National weekly newspapers Ala-Voly and Confidences au Sommet. Honoré N. Razafindramiandra was an Alma mater of Institut d'études politiques de Paris and graduated from the Public Service Division in 1965. He was awarded the National Order of the Legion of Honour. He served as Minister of Culture, Communications and Recreation of the Republic of Madagascar until his death on April 29, 1996.

== Descendant of King Ralambo and marriage ==
Honoré N. Razafindramiandra of Ambohidrabiby descendant of King Ralambo (1575–1612) ruler of Imerina and the Kingdom of Ambohidrabiby and son of the late Dr. Razafindramiandra Joseph and the late Razanabelo Germaine married, in Paris in 1962, Monique Ralantoaritsimba of Ambohimalaza descendant of Princess Rabehavina daughter of the Great Prince Andriamamilazabe and daughter of the late Professor Zoudher Ralantoaritsimba and the late Louise Rasoamananoro. From their union were born two children Narisetra and Harilanto who were both born same month, same date and same hour despite being born six years apart, a case considered unusual and was often considered as an issue during administrative proceedings. They belong to the cast known as The Andriantompokoindrindra (The Noble of the Noble ones). Honoré N. Razafindramiandra and Monique Ralantoaritsimba were cousins and were from a very prominent family whose family members were diplomats or into politics. Starting with his father-in-law the late Professor Ralantoaritsimba first surgeon to have performed an open-heart surgery in Madagascar and was awarded the National Order of the Legion of Honour. His wife uncles the late Lieutenant Albert Randriamaromanana took part in the Malagasy uprising of 1947 and was shot by the French on April 28, 1948, at Ankatso, Antananarivo, Madagascar, and the late Guy Willy Razanamasy who worked as a pharmacist and drug manufacturer before entering politics served twice as Mayor of Antananarivo and became Prime Minister and candidate at the presidential election in 1996. His uncles the late Rakotofiringa Crescent a dentist graduate was the first Malagasy Ambassador appointed in China, he was the Chief of Protocol under President Albert Zafy and was also the President of Madagascar China-Friendship Association, and the late Andrianjafy Désiré Lalao was President Special Delegation (PDS) from 1992 to 1995 and was awarded the French Legion of Honour. They were also surrounded by notable friends, His Excellency Mr. Evariste Marson Leader of Renewal of the Social Democratic Party or RPSD and former Minister of Finance and also candidate at the presidential election in 1992 and in 2001; and among the guest at their Paris wedding was his best friend and fellow students in Paris, His Excellency Mr. Jean Ping who is currently the Chairperson of the Commission of the African Union and former President of the fifty-ninth session of the United Nations General Assembly.

== Education and academics ==
Honoré N. Razafindramiandra attended l'Ecoles Officielles de Midongy South of Antsahadita and obtained his Certificate of Primary Education (C.E.P.E) at Condorcet private schools, Ambohijatovo Avaratra in 1952. He attended the prestigious Lycée Galliéni of Antananarivo where he got the first part of his high school diploma in 1959. He then went to Montpellier, France and attended Lycée Joffre de Montpellier for the second part of his high school diploma where he graduated, with honors, in philosophy and literature in 1960.

He moved to Paris and enrolled at the Faculty of Arts in Sorbonne in General Certificate of Literary Studies and graduated again, with honors, in 1961. After his academic success at Sorbonne, he prevailed handily the entrance examination at Paris Institute of Political Studies (Sciences Po-Paris) in 1961 and was enrolled under FAC Scholarship for four years and graduated from the Public Service Division in 1965. At the same time at Sciences Po, he was enrolled at two prestigious Institutes, Institute for the Study of Contemporary International Relations from 1963 to 1964 where he graduated from the Certificate of Diplomatic and Consular Studies and in 1965 under FAC Scholarship Specialty he was enrolled at the Institute of International Studies in at the University of Paris where he graduated in 1967 after presentation of the thesis entitled: 'Madagascar's accession to independence and the development of external relations of the Malagasy Republic" cite as references to students at ENAM (École nationale d'administration Malgache) and Faculty of History at University of Ankatso, Antananarivo, Madagascar.

== Internships and seminars ==
Honoré N. Razafindramiandra was a seminar on the Common Market in Brussels in 1962, in Milan in 1963 and in Naples in 1964. He was a full-time internship at the National Bank of Paris from October 1966 to June 1967 as bank counter cash transaction at Paris Nations, Extensions of credit in Aubervilliers, Foreign Trade in Ivry, Accounting in Melun. He was also a seminar on Management at the Embassy of the United States of America in 1972 in Antananarivo, Madagascar.

== Political career ==
Honoré N. Razafindramiandra was member of the MONIMA (Mouvement National pour l'Indépendance de Madagascar) a left-wing opposition movement led by the late Monja Jaona then he founded his own political party ACCORD (Actions des Chrétiens Cadres et Opérateurs de tous les Régions pour le Développement) under the label of these two political parties, he ran unsuccessfully for the local deputy elections of Avaradrano. He was a genuine activist of the Hery Velona Rasalama and Forces Vives Rasalama from 1990 until his death.

In 1991, President Ratsiraka was in power and faced an economy crippled by a general strike that had begun in May. On August 10, 1991, Honoré N. Razafindramiandra, Albert Zafy and more than 400,000 activists of the Vital Forces Committee known as Forces Vives marched peacefully on the President's Palace in order to oust the Ratsiraka government. When the Presidential Guard opened fire on the marchers and killed and wounded hundreds, a crisis of leadership occurred. President Ratsiraka stepped down and Albert Zafy, the central leader of the opposition forces ultimately emerged as the first president of Madagascar's Third Republic and Honoré N. Razafindramiandra served as Vice-President of the Forces Vives Committee in 1991 and as Vice-President of the High State Authority under the Transitional Government until 1993. During his duty as the Vice President of the High State Authority, while Zafy Albert was the President, he is well known for his integrity and his combate to fight corruption (Radison)

He served as Minister of Culture, Communications and Recreation in the Government of Madagascar from July 1994 to April 1996 During his time in office he issued an order preventing opposition parties from accessing state-owned radio and television.

== Death ==
Honoré N. Razafindramiandra assumed to the end his charges related to his ministerial duties. He was in Tamatave to support the newly award contest ceremony "Mihary". One hour before his death, he presided over another meeting of the local agents of the Ministry of Culture, Communications and Recreation. Despite his renal problem, it had been said during the Council of Ministers that he was poisoned during his sojourn in Tamatave. His body was flown to the capital the very day. The Government, hoard of officials and family members were present at Ivato Airport to escort his body home. Honoré N. Razafindramiandra body lay in repose in his home for a week; over three thousands mourners all over Madagascar presented their condolences. A post mortem was not carried out as body tissues were to be sent to Paris and would have delayed the burial for at least another week.

Honoré N. Razafindramiandra served as Minister of Culture, Communications and Recreation of the Republic of Madagascar until his death at age 57 on April 29, 1996, in Tamatave and rest in peace on the sacred hill of Ambohidrabiby. His wife Monique Ralantoaritsimba died on February 10, 2006, in Paris and rest in peace on the sacred hill of Ambohimalaza. They are survived by son Narisetra and daughter Harilanto and by grandchildren Malala and Kirsten Faniry.

== Legacy ==
Honoré N. Razafindramiandra thesis entitled: 'Madagascar's accession to independence and the development of external relations of the Malagasy Republic" cite as references to students at ENAM (École nationale d'administration Malgache) and Faculty of History at University of Ankatso, Antananarivo, Madagascar.

His son Narisetra Razafindramiandra based in Antananarivo, Madagascar was a former member and advisor to Ministerial Cabinets (MEM, MAE) of the Republic of Madagascar. Founder and currently Managing Director of Institut du Monde Contemporain (I.M.C).

His daughter Harilanto Razafindramiandra based in New York, U.S.A. took over the management of Ala-Voly which has been renamed AVE! Ala-Voly Entertainment and Confidences au Sommet. She has also worked for numerous Missions to the United Nations.
