= Andranofito =

- Location in Madagascar
- Coordinates: 19°48′16″S 47°24′02″E
- Country: Madagascar
- Region: Vakinankaratra
- District: Antanifotsy
- Elevation: 1,752 m (5,748 ft)

Population (2018)
  - Total: 15,127
  - Ethnicities: Merina
- Time zone: UTC3 (EAT)
- Postal code: 113

Andranofito (also Ambohimierambe-Andranofito) is a town and commune in Madagascar. It belongs to the district of Antanifotsy, which is a part of Vakinankaratra Region. The population of the commune was 15,127 in the 2018.

Primary and junior secondary education is available in town. The majority (99%) of the commune's population consists of farmers. The most important crop is rice, followed by sweet granadillas, maize and potatoes. Services provide employment for 1% of the population.
