= Antanifotsy District =

Antanifotsy (district)
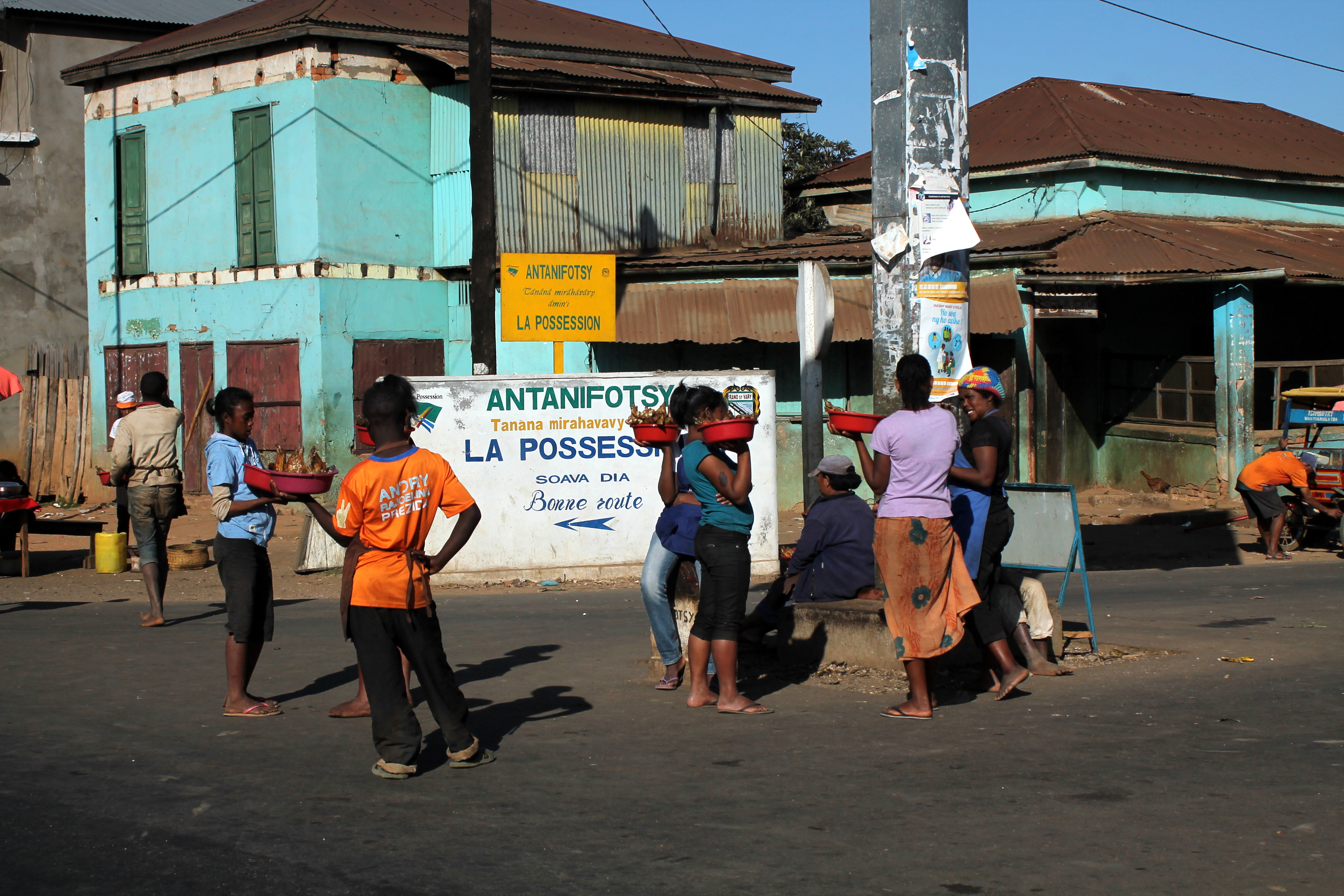
- Antanifotsy

- Location in Madagascar
- Country: Madagascar
- Region: Vakinankaratra
- District: Antanifotsy District

Area
  - Total: 3,425 km^{2} (1,322 sq mi)

Population (2018)
  - Total: 354,933
- Census
- Postal code: 109
- Climate: Cwb

Antanifotsy is a district in Vakinankaratra Region, Madagascar. The district has a total population estimated to 354,933 in 2018. The seat of the district administration is the town of Antanifotsy.

== Municipalities ==
The district is further divided into 14 municipalities:

- Ambatolahy
- Ambatomiady
- Ambatotsipihina
- Ambodiriana
- Ambohimandroso
- Ambohitompoina
- Ampitatafika
- Andranofito
- Anjamanga
- Antanifotsy
- Antsahalava
- Antsampandrano
- Belanitra Avaratra
- Soamanandrariny

== Roads ==
The National road 7, one of the main roads of Madagascar, crosses this district from North to South. It is also crossed by a railroad but the service had been interrupted.

== Rivers ==
The springs of the Onive River are near Antanifotsy.

== Nature ==
Part of the Marolambo National Park, near Ambohitompoina.
