= Mayor of Antananarivo =

Municipal office in Madagascar's capital

- Ben'ny tanànan'Antananarivo
- Coat of arms of Antananarivo
- Incumbent; Feno Ralambomanana since 15 April 2026
- Term length: 5 years
- Formation: 1897 (as Governor-General of Madagascar)
- First holder: Deslions
- Website: www.mairie-antananarivo.mg

The Mayor of Antananarivo is the Mayor of the capital and largest city in Madagascar, Antananarivo.

The post of mayor of Antananarivo is considered to be one of the most prominent and influential offices in Madagascar. It is also considered one of the "politically defining posts" in the country, from which politicians often emerge into higher offices, such as the Malagasy Presidency.

The former President of Madagascar, Marc Ravalomanana, was mayor of the city when he rose to power in 2002. Andry Rajoelina was elected as Mayor in December 2007 and became Ravalomanana's main opponent, leading a general strike in Antananarivo in January 2009.

On 3 February 2009, after declaring himself to be in charge of the country, Rajoelina was dismissed as Mayor and a special delegation, headed by Guy Randrianarisoa, was appointed instead. Rajoelina denounced the decision, saying that there was "no valid reason" for it and that he was prepared to face arrest if necessary; he warned that the city would "not accept this decision". At a rally on 4 February, Rajoelina described the appointment of Randrianarisoa as "an insult to the people of Madagascar"; he instead designated Michèle Ratsivalaka to succeed him as Mayor and gave her his mayoral scarf. Rajoelina took power as head of state in March 2009. He later replaced Ratsivalaka with Edgard Razafindravahy, who served without vice-presidents throughout his term. He resigned in August 2013 to enter in the 2013 presidential election and the city of Antananarivo remained without leadership until November 2013, when Olga Rasamimanana was named to one of the vice-presidency positions, making her de facto mayor of Antananarivo.

== List of mayors ==
=== Appointed mayors ===
From 1897 to 1956, mayors were appointed by the Governor-General of Madagascar.

(Only last names are listed)

1. 1897: Deslions
2. 1899: Rambeau
3. 1903: Berthier
4. 1904: Estèbe
5. 1907: Titeux
6. 1909: De Mortière
7. 1910: Bord
8. 1911: Hesling
9. 1912: Bensch
10. 1913: De Guise
11. 1914: Carron
12. 1917: Berthier
13. 1919: De Chazal
14. 1920: Voyron
15. 1922: Pechmarty
16. 1927: Pont
17. 1927: Giresse
18. 1929: Krotoff
19. 1929: De Longchamp
20. 1930: Battini
21. 1932: Rambeau
22. 1932: Henry
23. 1933: Rambeau
24. 1935: Henri
25. 1937: Pechayrand
26. 1937: Bourgoin
27. 1938: Leuerre
28. 1938: Rambeau
29. 1940: Poupon
30. 1941: Bruniquel
31. 1942: Riddell
32. 1943: Prospérial
33. 1945: Prospérini
34. 1945: Hue
35. 1946: Rambeau
36. 1947: Bordier
37. 1949: Vignau
38. 1950: Fayoul
39. 1951: Vignau
40. 1954: Le Garreres
41. 1955: Saget

Source: Histoire de la commune

=== Elected mayors ===
#	Image	Mayor	Term in office	Party affiliation
42		Stanislas Rakotonirina	1956 – 1959	
43		Richard Andriamanjato (1930–2013; aged 82)	1959 – 1975	AKFM
44		Andriantiana Rakotovao	1977 – 1983	
45		Guy Razanamasy (1928–2011; aged 82)	1983 – 1991	FNDR
46		?	1991 – 1994	
47		Guy Razanamasy (1928–2011; aged 82)	1994 – 1999	AREMA
48		Marc Ravalomanana (born 1949)	11 December 1999 – 6 May 2002	Tiako Iarivo
49		Patrick Ramiaramanana	23 October 2003 – 25 January 2007	TIM
50		Hery Rafalimanana	2007 – December 2007	TIM
51		Andry Rajoelina (born 1974)	December 2007 – 3 February 2009	TGV
Acting		Guy Randrianarisoa	3 February 2009 – March 2009	Independent
52		Michèle Ratsivalaka	March 2009 – 13 August 2009	TGV
53		Edgard Razafindravahy	13 August 2009 – August 2013	TGV
Acting		Olga Rasmimanana	November 2013 – March 2014	TGV
54		Lalao Ravalomanana (born 1953)	October 2015 – January 2020	TIM
55		Naina Andriantsitohaina (born 1963)	16 January 2020 – 24 January 2025	TGV
56		Harilala Ramanantsoa (born Unknown)	24 January 2025 – 31 March 2026	TGV
Acting		Zaratiana Rajohnson	31 March 2026 – 15 April 2026	Independent
Interim		Feno Ralambomanana (born 1979)	15 April 2026 – Present	TIM

== See also ==
- Timeline of Antananarivo
