= Ruffine Tsiranana =

Malagasy politician (1939–2019)

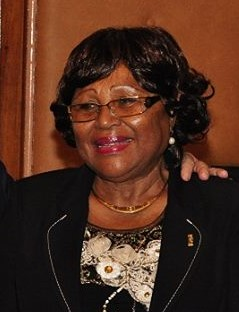
Ruffine Tsiranana

Ruffine Tsiranana (born February 13, 1939, in Ambohimarina, Mandritsara died February 23, 2019, in Paris) was a Malagasy politician. She was a member of the Senate of Madagascar for Sofia Region. She was the daughter of the late President of Madagascar, Philibert Tsiranana, and the former First Lady of Madagascar, Justine Tsiranana.
