= Ambatolahy, Antanifotsy =

Ambatolahy
- Location in Madagascar
- Coordinates: 19°44′S 47°17′E
- Country: Madagascar
- Region: Vakinankaratra
- District: Antanifotsy
- Elevation: 1,648 m (5,407 ft)

Population (2001)
  - Total: 9,000
- Time zone: UTC3 (EAT)

Ambatolahy is a town and commune in Madagascar. It belongs to the district of Antanifotsy, which is a part of Vakinankaratra Region. The population of the commune was estimated to be approximately 9,000 in 2001 commune census.

Primary and junior level secondary education are available in town. The majority 97% of the population of the commune are farmers, while an additional 2% receives their livelihood from raising livestock. The most important crop is rice, while other important products are sweet granadilla, maize and potatoes. Services provide employment for 1% of the population.
