= Ambodiriana, Antanifotsy =

Ambodiriana
- Location in Madagascar
- Coordinates: 19°35′S 47°32′E
- Country: Madagascar
- Region: Vakinankaratra
- District: Antanifotsy
- Elevation: 1,586 m (5,203 ft)

Population (2001)
  - Total: 15,000
- Time zone: UTC3 (EAT)

Ambodiriana is a town and commune in Madagascar. It belongs to the district of Antanifotsy, which is a part of Vakinankaratra Region. The population of the commune was estimated to be approximately 15,000 in 2001 commune census.

Primary and junior level secondary education are available in town. The majority 99% of the population of the commune are farmers. The most important crop is rice, while other important products are vegetables, maize, cassava and potatoes. Services provide employment for 1% of the population.
