= Antsahalava =

- Location in Madagascar
- Coordinates: 19°34′56″S 47°28′37″E
- Country: Madagascar
- Region: Vakinankaratra
- District: Antanifotsy
- Elevation: 1,578 m (5,177 ft)

Population (2018)
  - Total: 29,556
  - Ethnicities: Merina
- Time zone: UTC3 (EAT)
- Postal code: 113

Antsahalava is a town and commune in Madagascar. It belongs to the district of Antanifotsy, which is a part of Vakinankaratra Region. The population of the commune was 29,556 in 2018.

Primary and junior level secondary education are available in town. The majority 98% of the population of the commune are farmers. The most important crop is rice, while other important products are maize and cassava. Services provide employment for 2% of the population.
