= Thérèse Zafy =

Malagasy political figure and activist

Thérèse Zafimahova Zafy

First Lady of Madagascar
- In office March 27, 1991 – September 5, 1996
- President: Albert Zafy
- Preceded by: Céline Ratsiraka
- Succeeded by: Sahondra Ratsirahonana

Personal details
- Born: Thérèse Auguste Zafimahova French Madagascar
- Party: National Reconciliation Committee (NRC) (2002–2017)
- Other political affiliations: National Union for Democracy and Development (UNDD) (before 2002)
- Spouse: Albert Zafy (died 2017)
- Children: Three

Thérèse Auguste Zafy (born Zafimahova) is a Malagasy political figure and activist who served as First Lady of Madagascar from 1991 until 1996. She is the widow of former President Albert Zafy, who died in 2017.

== Early life ==
Zafy, a member of the Antesaka people, was born Thérèse Auguste Zafimahova to parents, Antoine Zafimahova and Marie Anne Kemba. She and Albert Zafy married during the 1960s in a traditional Antankarana wedding ceremony.

== Personal life ==
The couple had three children - Aimé Zafy, Sylvie Zafy, and Richard "Titus" Zafy.

She survived her husband, who died of complications from a stroke at Saint Pierre Hospital in Réunion on October 13, 2017.
