= Marcelle Larguier =

Malagasy political figure

First Lady of Madagascar
- In role 11 October 1972 – 5 February 1975
- President: Gabriel Ramanantsoa
- Preceded by: Justine Tsiranana
- Succeeded by: Thérèse Ratsimandrava

Spouse of the Prime Minister of Madagascar
- In role 11 October 1972 – 5 February 1975
- Prime Minister: Gabriel Ramanantsoa
- Preceded by: Position Reestablished
- Succeeded by: Position Abolished

Personal details
- Spouse: Gabriel Ramanantsoa (1934–1979; his death)

Marcelle Larguier was a Malagasy political figure who served as the second First Lady of Madagascar from 1972 to 1975 during the presidency of her husband, General Gabriel Ramanantsoa.

Larguier held French nationality. She married Ramanantsoa on 26 May 1934, at a Catholic Church in the Faravohitra neighborhood of Antananarivo. The couple had four children - Monique, Christian, Jean-Pierre and Gérard.

Ramanantsoa's presidency was marked by a period of ethnic and political turmoil in Madagascar. In response, Larguier, a French national and Madagascar's second first lady, maintained a low political profile and refrained from taking public stands on controversial issues during her tenure.

Larguier survived her husband, who died on 9 May 1979.
