= Ny Hasina Andriamanjato =

Malagasy politician

Ny Hasina Andriamanjato is a Malagasy politician who served in the government of Madagascar as Minister of Foreign Affairs from 2009 to 2010.

== Life and career ==
The son of Pastor Richard Andriamanjato and Bao Andriamanjato, Andriamanjato studied in Madagascar and the Soviet Union, and he became Minister for Post and Telecommunications under Prime Minister Francisque Ravony in 1993. He held this position for nine years, serving under two presidents (Albert Zafy and Didier Ratsiraka) and a total of five prime ministers. In 2002, he was poisoned, and as a result, he stood down in late February 2002, playing no further part in the political struggle of that year.

After 2002, he stayed out of the political arena, while remaining a member of the Congress Party for the Independence of Madagascar. On March 31, 2006, he appeared for an interview on TV Plus, where he expressed his belief in the necessity of national reconciliation and said that he was prepared to run in the next presidential election if the nation's interest required it. He officially confirmed his candidacy on May 5, 2006, but said that he would not be a candidate of any party or coalition. As an independent candidate in the election, held on December 3, 2006, he placed sixth with 4.18% of the vote.

During the 2009 Malagasy political crisis, Andriamanjato was among the opposition leaders who backed Antananarivo Mayor Andry Rajoelina in his dispute with President Marc Ravalomanana; along with other opposition leaders, he submitted a petition to the High Constitutional Court on 2 February 2009 asking it to remove Ravalomanana from office. After Rajoelina declared himself head of state (while still in opposition, and not holding actual power), he appointed Andriamanjato as his Minister of Foreign Affairs. Andriamanjato participated in negotiations between Ravalomanana and Rajoelina on February 24, 2009. After Ravalomanana resigned and Rajoelina took power, Andriamanjato officially succeeded Marcel Ranjeva as Minister of Foreign Affairs at a ceremony on March 23, 2009.

On 8 September 2009, Andriamanjato was promoted to the rank of Deputy Prime Minister, while retaining the foreign affairs portfolio. A few months later, he resigned from the government on 12 February 2010. In doing so, he cited Rajoelina's failure to create a national unity government, which he said was necessary to pave the way for elections and prevent future crises. However, he also said that the purpose of his resignation was "to guide Andry Rajoelina, to help him."
