= Ambatomiady =

- Location in Madagascar
- Coordinates: 19°41′S 47°25′E
- Country: Madagascar
- Region: Vakinankaratra
- District: Antanifotsy

Area
  - Total: 278 km^{2} (107 sq mi)
- Elevation: 1,608 m (5,276 ft)

Population (2018)
  - Total: 31,140
- Time zone: UTC3 (EAT)
- Postal code: 113

Ambatomiady is a rural municipality in Madagascar. It belongs to the district of Antanifotsy, which is a part of Vakinankaratra Region. The population of the commune was 31,140 in 2018.

Primary and junior level secondary education are available in town. The majority 98% of the population of the commune are farmers, while an additional 1% receives their livelihood from raising livestock. The most important crop is rice, while other important products are maize, cassava and potatoes. Services provide employment for 1% of the population.
