= Ambohitompoina =

- Location in Madagascar
- Coordinates: 19°45′S 47°34′E
- Country: Madagascar
- Region: Vakinankaratra
- District: Antanifotsy

Area
  - Total: 422 km^{2} (163 sq mi)
- Elevation: 1,606 m (5,269 ft)

Population (2018)
  - Total: 27,899
- Time zone: UTC3 (EAT)
- Postal code: 109

Ambohitompoina is a town and commune in Madagascar. It belongs to the district of Antanifotsy, which is a part of Vakinankaratra Region. The population of the commune was 27,899 in 2018.

Primary and junior level secondary education are available in town. The majority 99% of the population of the commune are farmers. The most important crop is rice, while other important products are beans, maize and cassava. Services provide employment for 1% of the population.

== Sights ==
The town is an entrance place of the Marolambo National Park.
