= Voahangy Rajaonarimampianina =

Malagasy public figure

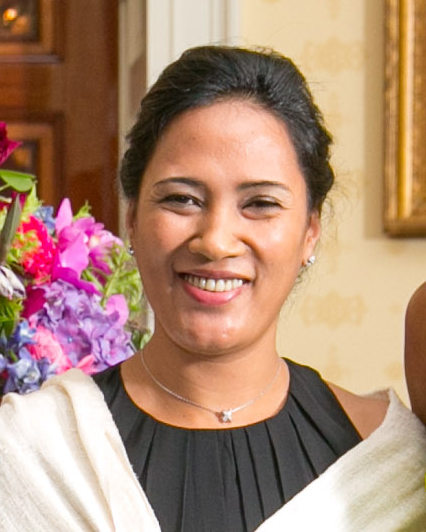
- Rajaonarimampianina in 2014

First Lady of Madagascar
- In role 25 January 2014 – 7 September 2018
- President: Hery Rajaonarimampianina
- Preceded by: Mialy Rajoelina
- Succeeded by: Mialy Rajoelina

Personal details
- Party: Hery Vaovao ho an'i Madagasikara
- Spouse: Hery Rajaonarimampianina

Voahangy Rajaonarimampianina is a Malagasy public figure who held the position of First Lady of Madagascar from 2014 to 2018. She is married to former Madagascar president, Hery Rajaonarimampianina.

== Biography ==
Voahangy Rajaonarimampianina married Hery Rajaonarimampianina in a ceremony held at the Ambohinaorina Church of Jesus Christ in Madagascar (FJKM) in Sabotsy Namehana. The couple have two daughters, as well as Hery Rajaonarimampianina's children from his previous marriage.

== First Lady of Madagascar ==
Rajaonarimampianina became the country's first lady in January 2014. She has called for investors to create employment opportunities for Malagasy women, especially in the arts, agriculture and textile industries.

On 26 June 2016 Rajaonarimampianina attended National Day celebrations while wearing a white-and-green, pineapple-themed Dolce & Gabbana dress valued at an estimated $7,745 U.S. dollars, the equivalent of 20 million Malagasy ariary. The first lady's choice of attire quickly ignited a fierce debate across Madagascar's media and social media platforms. In a country where 92% of the population is classified as poor, including the 53% of residents who live in extreme poverty, much of the discussion focused on the high cost of the garment. Malagasy social media users and local media released a flood of pineapple-centric memes and political cartoons poking fun and criticism at the pricey dress, while the hashtag #mananasy, which translates as pineapple in Malagasy, began trending within days of the event.

In February 2023, Voahangy Rajaonarimampianina was sentenced to a one-year suspended prison sentence, together with a fine of one million ariary. She was found guilty of aiding and abetting perjury.
