= Ambohimandroso, Antanifotsy =

Ambohimandroso
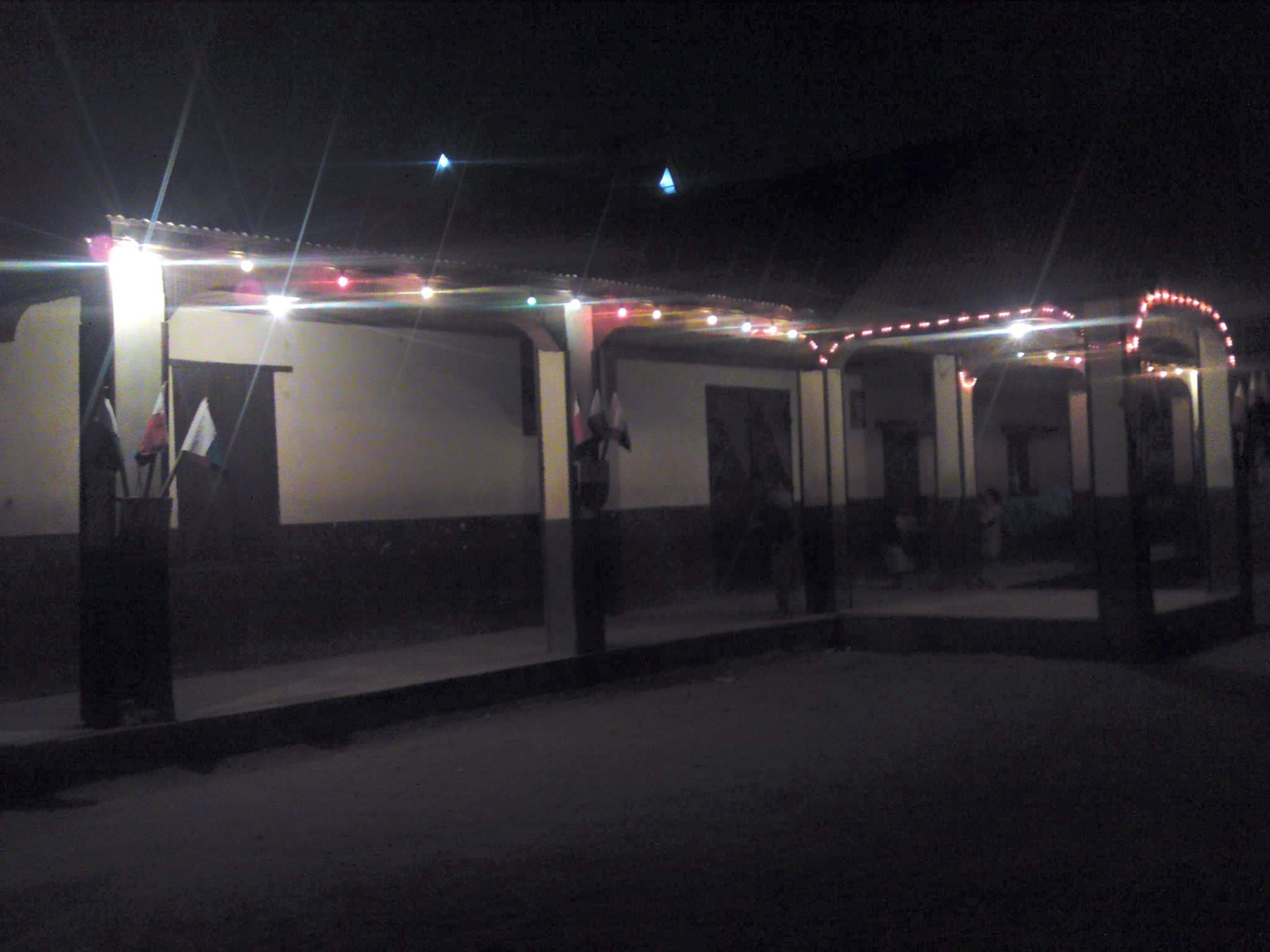
- Ambohimandroso at night

- Location in Madagascar
- Coordinates: 19°31′S 47°25′E
- Country: Madagascar
- Region: Vakinankaratra
- District: Antanifotsy
- Elevation: 1,563 m (5,128 ft)

Population (2001)
  - Total: 24,000
- Time zone: UTC3 (EAT)

Ambohimandroso (also Ambohimandroso Gara) is a town and commune in Madagascar. It belongs to the district of Antanifotsy, which is a part of Vakinankaratra Region. The population of the commune was estimated to be approximately 24,000 in 2001 commune census.

Primary and junior level secondary education are available in town. The majority 80% of the population of the commune are farmers, while an additional 6% receives their livelihood from raising livestock. The most important crops are rice and barley, while other important agricultural products are vegetables, maize, sweet potatoes and potatoes. Industry and services provide employment for 1% and 13% of the population, respectively. Ambohimandroso Gara is a railway station on the Antananarivo - Antsirabe line.
