= Ampitatafika, Antanifotsy =

Ampitatafika
- Location in Madagascar
- Coordinates: 19°34′S 47°21′E
- Country: Madagascar
- Region: Vakinankaratra
- District: Antanifotsy
- Elevation: 1,576 m (5,171 ft)

Population (2018)
  - Total: 32.955
  - Ethnicities: Merina
- Time zone: UTC3 (EAT)
- Postal code: 113

Ampitatafika is a town and commune in Madagascar. It belongs to the district of Antanifotsy, which is a part of Vakinankaratra Region. The population of the commune was 32,955 in 2018.

Primary and junior level secondary education are available in town. The majority 95% of the population of the commune are farmers. The most important crop is rice, while other important products are beans, maize and potatoes. Services provide employment for 5% of the population.

== Notable people ==
- Honoré N. Razafindramiandra (1939-1996), Malagasy politician
