= Mialy Rajoelina =

First Lady of Madagascar from 2019 to 2025

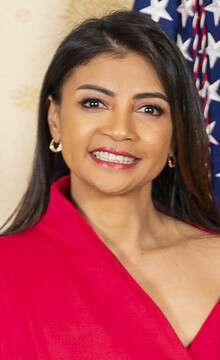
- Rajoelina in 2022

First Lady of Madagascar
- In role 16 December 2023 – 14 October 2025
- President: Andry Rajoelina
- Succeeded by: Elisa Randrianirina
- In role 19 January 2019 – 9 September 2023
- President: Andry Rajoelina
- Preceded by: Voahangy Rajaonarimampianina
- In role 17 March 2009 – 25 January 2014
- President: Andry Rajoelina
- Preceded by: Lalao Ravalomanana
- Succeeded by: Voahangy Rajaonarimampianina

Personal details
- Born: Mialy Razakandisa
- Citizenship: Malagasy, French
- Party: Young Malagasies Determined
- Spouse: Andry Rajoelina (m. 2000)
- Children: 3
- Education: Conservatoire national des arts et métiers

Mialy Razakandisa Rajoelina (née Razakandisa) was the first lady of Madagascar from 2019 to 2025 as wife of former President Andry Rajoelina. She was previously first lady during her husband's presidency of the High Transitional Authority of Madagascar from 2009 to 2014.

== Early life, education, marriage ==
Mialy Razakandisa Rajoelina, the eldest of three girls, was born in Antananarivo and was raised in a relatively affluent family. Her mother, Nicole Razakandisa, a Protestant (Church of Jesus Christ in Madagascar, FJKM), who died in 2012, was a chemist by profession and owned a chemical products company. She holds a master's degree in finance and accounting management from the Conservatoire National des Arts et Métiers in Paris. In 1994, Mialy met her future husband, Andry Rajoelina, at a high school in Antananarivo. The couple maintained a long-distance relationship for six years while Mialy completed her studies in Paris and Andry started his career as an entrepreneur. They reunited in Madagascar in 2000 and married later that year. Mialy and Andry have three children together: two sons named Arena (born in 2001) and Ilontsoa (born in 2005), and a daughter (born in 2007) named Ilona-Andrialy, Andrialy being a combination of their own names.

== Business and links with France ==
Mialy's marriage to Andry provided him with the opportunity to lead Doma Pub, a company owned by Mialy's family, where he ventured into the local advertising hoarding market and began his career as an entrepreneur. During the 2009 crisis in Madagascar, amidst safety concerns, most of Mialy's family relocated to France, including the couple's children. Mialy, who obtained French citizenship while studying in France, also faced safety concerns during this turbulent period.

== As first lady ==
Mialy has made frequent public appearances, such as when she spoke at a TED Talks in Antananarivo in 2011. After her husband became president Mialy founded Fitia, a humanitarian association which aims to collect donations and distribute them to the most vulnerable in Madagascar, especially women. She is its president and spokesperson. Supporters of Mialy and her husband say that Fitia shows that the couple cares for Madagascar and its people, while critics say that the organisation is a propaganda campaign aimed at increasing their popularity. Mialy has admitted to using her popularity to help her husband, adding that she sees nothing wrong with it and that people who support her usually support her husband as well. She was Madagascar’s youngest ever first lady.

== Faith ==
Like her husband, Mialy is a Roman Catholic, in April 2013 she and Andry met with Pope Francis to become the first African leader and first lady to be received by the new pope at that time.
