= Antsampandrano, Antanifotsy =

Antsampandrano
- Location in Madagascar
- Coordinates: 19°55′S 47°34′E
- Country: Madagascar
- Region: Vakinankaratra
- District: Antanifotsy
- Elevation: 1,620 m (5,310 ft)

Population (2018)
  - Total: 29,788
  - Ethnicities: Merina
- Time zone: UTC3 (EAT)
- Postal code: 113

Antsampandrano is a town and commune in Madagascar. It belongs to the district of Antanifotsy, which is a part of Vakinankaratra Region. The population of the commune was 29,788 in 2018.

Primary and junior level secondary education are available in town. It is also a site of industrial-scale mining. The majority 98% of the population of the commune are farmers, while an additional 1% receives their livelihood from raising livestock. The most important crop is rice, while other important products are maize and potatoes. Services provide employment for 1% of the population.
