= Soamanandrariny =

Soamanandreriny
- Location in Madagascar
- Coordinates: 19°39′S 47°17′E
- Country: Madagascar
- Region: Vakinankaratra
- District: Antanifotsy
- Elevation: 1,552 m (5,092 ft)

Population (2018)
  - Total: 24,003
- Time zone: UTC3 (EAT)

Soamanandrariny is a rural commune in Madagascar. It belongs to the district of Antanifotsy, which is a part of Vakinankaratra Region. The population of the commune was 24,003 in 2018.

Primary and junior level secondary education are available in town. The majority 99% of the population of the commune are farmers. The most important crops are potatoes and tobacco; also rice is an important agricultural product. Services provide employment for 1% of the population.
