= Bao Andriamanjato =

Malagasy engineer and politician (1929–1994)

- Born: September 21, 1929; Madagascar
- Occupations: Engineer; Writer; Politician; Activist

Bao Andriamanjato (21 September 1929 – 1994; born Rahantavololona Razanamahandry Alphonsine Razafindrakotohasina) was an engineer and politician from Madagascar. She is said to have been the first female engineer in Madagascar and in Africa.

She married Richard Andriamanjato, a politician and pastor, in September 1958, and they had four children, including politician Ny Hasina Andriamanjato.

In July 1991, while her husband was leader of the opposition and Bao was shadow minister for public works, she was arrested outside the Public Works Ministry building, which was one of six buildings being occupied by the Active Forces opposition grouping. Bao was driven away, and five people were injured in scuffles at the scene.

She was a minister in the 1991 Gouvernement Insurrectionnel led by President Jean Rakotoarison,

In 2021 a group of female students made a short animation Bao et la robotique, in tribute to Andriamanjato, which won an award in a competition organised by Ikala STEM and UNESCO.
