= Justine Tsiranana =

Malagasy public figure

Justine Tsiranana Kalotody MGH
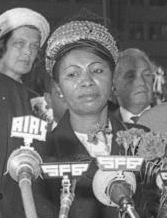
- Tsiranana during a visit to West Berlin in 1962

First Lady of Madagascar
- In role June 26, 1960 – October 11, 1972
- President: Philibert Tsiranana
- Preceded by: Position Established
- Succeeded by: Marcelle Larguier

Spouse of the Prime Minister of Madagascar
- In office 14 October 1958 – 1 May 1959
- Prime Minister: Philibert Tsiranana
- Preceded by: Position Reestablished
- Succeeded by: Position Abolished

Personal details
- Born: Justine Kalotody; 1918
- Died: 1 July 1999 (aged 81)
- Party: PDS
- Spouse: Philibert Tsiranana (m. 1933–1978; his death)
- Children: Seven, including Pierre Tsiranana, adopted Ruffine Tsiranana
- Profession: Couturiere

Justine Tsiranana (c. 1918 – 1 July 1999) was a Malagasy public figure who served as the first First Lady of Madagascar from 1960 to 1972. She was the wife of the country's founding president, Philibert Tsiranana.

Tsiranana was born Justine Kalotody. Originally a seamstress descending from the first translator of the Evangile in Tsimihety language, she married Philibert Tsiranana on January 29, 1933, in a Catholic wedding ceremony in the village of Antsirabe, Mandritsara District. In addition to her role as the country's first First Lady from 1960 to 1972, Tisranana served as the honorary president of the Red Cross of Madagascar.

Justine Tsiranana died in July 1999 at the age of 81.

The award-winning red rose variety “Madame Tsiranana” was created in her honour by French rose nurser Paul Croix in 1970.

Philibert Tsiranana, was.born in october, 18, 1910 at Ambarikorano- Mandritsara- Sofia in Mahajanga and died in April, 16th, 1978 in Antananarivo, entered in Nahidrano Antsohihy- Sofia, they celebred their mariage in janoary 29th,1944

Philibert Tsiranana was a teacher and politician man and the first president of malagasy 1st May 1959 to October 11th, 1972.

== Honors ==
- Philippines: Order of the Golden Heart Presidential Award (6 August 1964)
