= Lalao Ravalomanana =

Malagasy businesswoman and politician (born 1953)

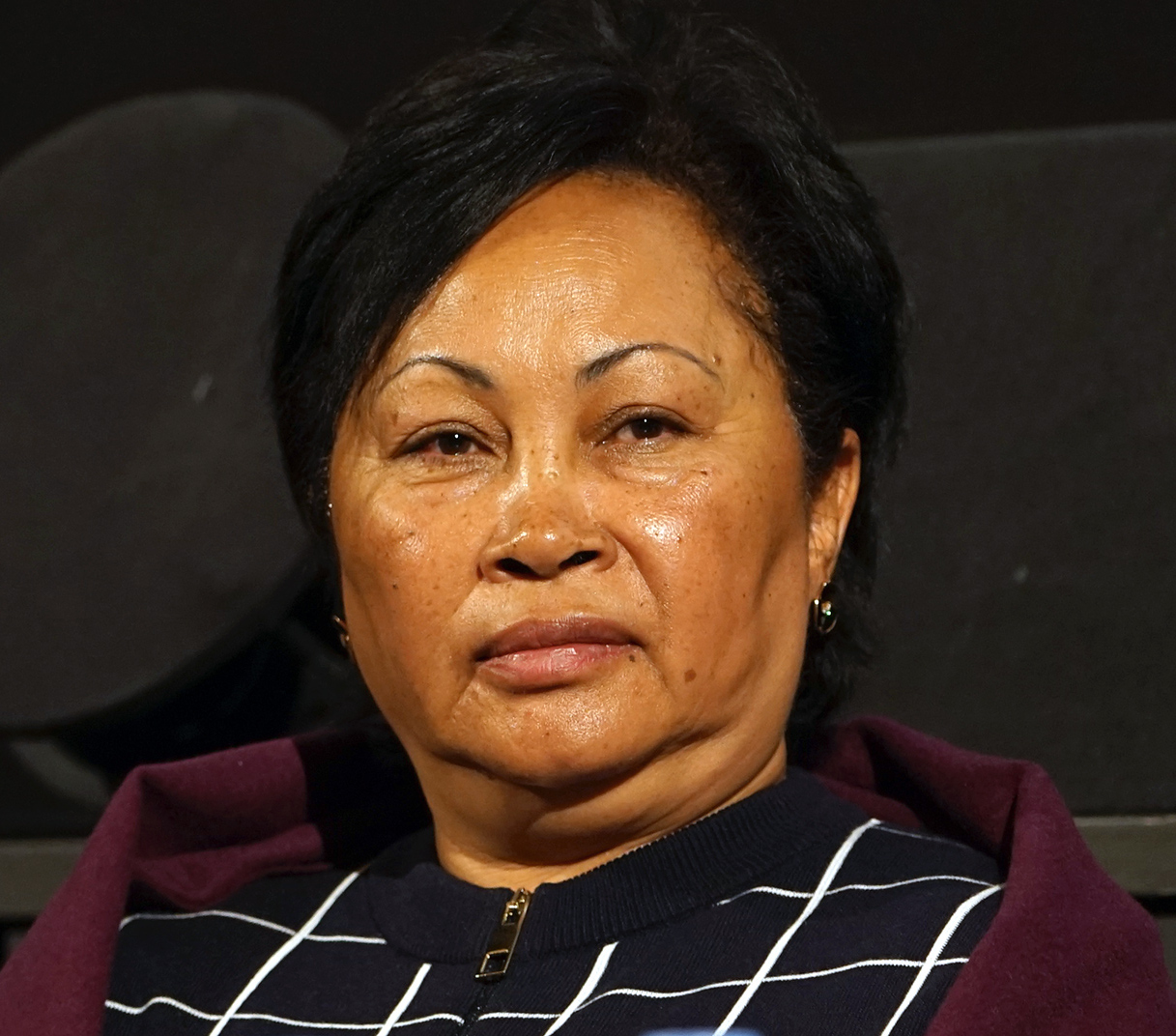
- Ravalomanana in 2017

Mayor of Antananarivo
- In office 7 October 2015 – 16 January 2020
- Preceded by: Olga Rasmimanana (Acting)
- Succeeded by: Naina Andriantsitohaina

First Lady of Madagascar
- In role 6 May 2002 – 17 March 2009
- President: Marc Ravalomanana
- Preceded by: Céline Ratsiraka
- Succeeded by: Mialy Rajoelina

Personal details
- Born: Lalao Harivelo Rakotonirainy; May 1953 (age 72) Antananarivo, French Madagascar
- Party: I Love Madagascar
- Spouse: Marc Ravalomanana (m. 1974)

Neny Lalao Rakotonirainy Ravalomanana (born 1953) is a Malagasy businesswoman and politician who served as the First Lady of Madagascar from 2002 to 2009, when her husband, Marc Ravalomanana, was president.

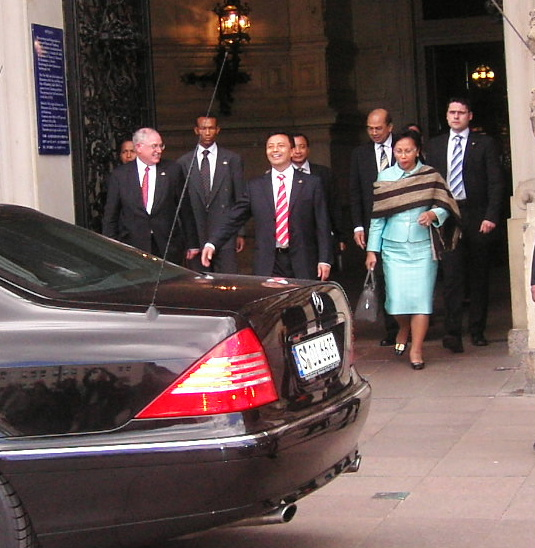
Lalao Ravalomanana and her husband in 2007

Ravalomanana was born Lalao Harivelo Rakotonirainy in Antananarivo, French Madagascar. She married Marc Ravalomanana in 1974 at a ceremony held in Imerikasinina. The couple have four children: Josoa, Tojo, Sarah, and Maika.

In April 2013, Lalao Ravalomanana put herself forward to run in the 2013 presidential election, an election in which her husband was barred from running. However, Ravalomanana, who had recently returned from exile in South Africa where she lived with her husband, was barred from running for not having lived in Madagascar for 6 months before the poll. Ravalomanana then publicly endorsed medical doctor and politician Jean Louis Robinson from Antananarivo.

From October 2015 to January 2020 Lalao Ravalomanana served as Mayor of Antananarivo.

== See also ==
- Timeline of Antananarivo
