= Arinosy Jacques Razafimbelo =

Malagasy politician

Arinosy Jacques Razafimbelo is a Malagasy politician. A member of the National Assembly of Madagascar, he was elected as a member of the Tiako i Madagasikara party; he represents the first constituency of Antananarivo.
