= L'Express de Madagascar =

- Country: Madagascar
- ISSN: 1607-4327
- OCLC number: n607089287
- Website: lexpress.mg

L'Express de Madagascar is a daily newspaper published in Madagascar. It is primarily published in French, although individual sections and stories are also published in Malagasy.

In 2002, the newspaper was purchased by Edgard Razafindravahy.

== See also ==
- List of newspapers in Madagascar
