= Le Phare de Majunga =

French weekly newspaper from Majunga

- November 8, 1931 issue of Le Phare de Majunga
- Type: Weekly
- Founded: 1908
- Language: French language
- Headquarters: Majunga

Le Phare de Majunga was a French language weekly newspaper published from Majunga, Madagascar. The newspaper was founded in 1908.
