= Midi Madagasikara =

Daily newspaper published in Madagascar

Midi Madagasikara is a daily newspaper owned by Midi Madagasikara S.A. and published in Antananarivo, Madagascar. It began distribution on 18 August 1983. The founder of Midi Madagasikara was Marthe Rajaofera Andriambelo. A key pillar of the newspaper was her husband, the architect Willy Andriambelo (†2025). In 2006, their daughter Juliana Rakotoarivelo Andriambelo became the managing director of the Midi Media Group.

The paper is published from Monday to Saturday and is primarily in French, with two pages in Malagasy and a bi-monthly single page in English. It is printed in a tabloid format with regular sections on politics, economy, society, sports, culture, and world news.

== See also ==
- List of newspapers in Madagascar
