= Madagascar Tribune =

Daily newspaper

The Madagascar Tribune is a daily newspaper published in Antananarivo, Madagascar. It is primarily in French, with several articles in Malagasy.

The Madagascar-tribune.com is an independent online newspaper, published by the Society Malagasy Edition (SME). The journal exists since December 1988, and became an independent online newspaper on 29 January 2009.

== See also ==
- List of newspapers in Madagascar
