= Richard Andriamanjato =

Malagasy politician

Richard Mahitsison Andriamanjato (31 July 1930 – 16 May 2013) was a Malagasy politician.

After leaving education, Andriamanjato became a Pastor. He also became involved with the nationalist cause. From 1950 to 1957, he studied in France. In 1957, he attended the Bandung Conference and became the leading figure in the section of the nationalist movement opposed to Philibert Tsiranana. He also succeeded the popular nationalist figure Pastor Ravelojaona as pastor of the Ambohitantely Temple in Antananarivo.

Andriamanjato soon joined the Council of the Protestant Federation of Madagascar. He also became the President of the Council of the Churches of Africa, was a member of the World Council of Churches of Geneva and a director of the Christian Institute for Peace.

Andriamanjato also became a convinced communist. In 1958, he founded the Party of the Independence Congress of Madagascar (AKFM), which developed links with the French Communist Party and acted as the main opposition for more than a decade. In 1959, he was elected Mayor of Antananarivo. He remained the AKFM's president until at least 1965, but was ineligible for the 1965 Malagasy presidential election due to his age.

In 1972, Andriamanjato supported Didier Ratsiraka, and in 1976 he led the AKFM into the National Front for the Defence of the Revolution, the government coalition. A supporter of Albert Zafy, he split from Ratsiraka and the AKFM in 1989 to form the Party of the Independence Congress of Madagascar - Renewal. From 1991 to 1993, he was co-president of the transitional Committee for Economic and Social Recovery along with Manandafy Rakotonirina; in 1993 he became the President of the National Assembly of Madagascar, serving in that position until 1998. He stood for his party in the November 1996 presidential election and took fifth place, receiving 4.94% of the votes cast.

In 1991, his wife, Bao Andriamanjato, was arrested in Antananarivo, with five protestors being injured by police while interfering. Since the mid-1990s, Andriamanjato stepped down from public life. His son, Ny Hasina Andriamanjato, is also a politician.

== Sources ==
=== Bibliography ===
- Paredes, Alejandro (2010). "REDES ECUMÉNICAS A MEDIADOS DEL SIGLO XX: UN ANÁLISIS DE REDES DE COAUTORÍAS EN LOS ESCRITOS DE MAURICIO LÓPEZ (1945-1972)". Universum. 25 (2). University of Talca: 117–137. doi:10.4067/S0718-23762010000200008. hdl:11336/101627. ISSN 0718-2376. ProQuest 848408938.

Political offices
Preceded by Stanislas Rakotonirina	Mayor of Antananarivo; 1959–1975	Succeeded by Andriantiana Rakotovao
