= Iavoloha Palace =

Official residence of the President of Madagascar

Coordinates: 19.0034°S 47.5286°E

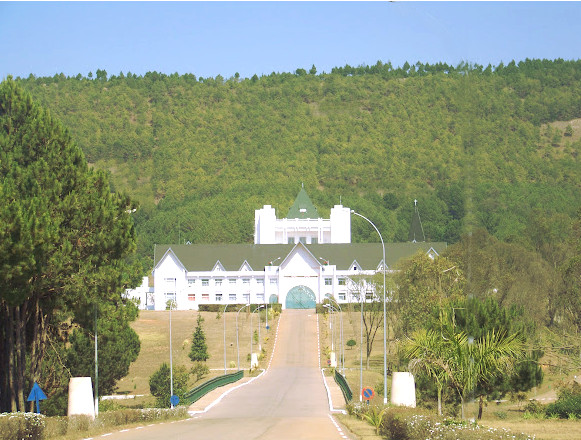
Iavoloha Palace.

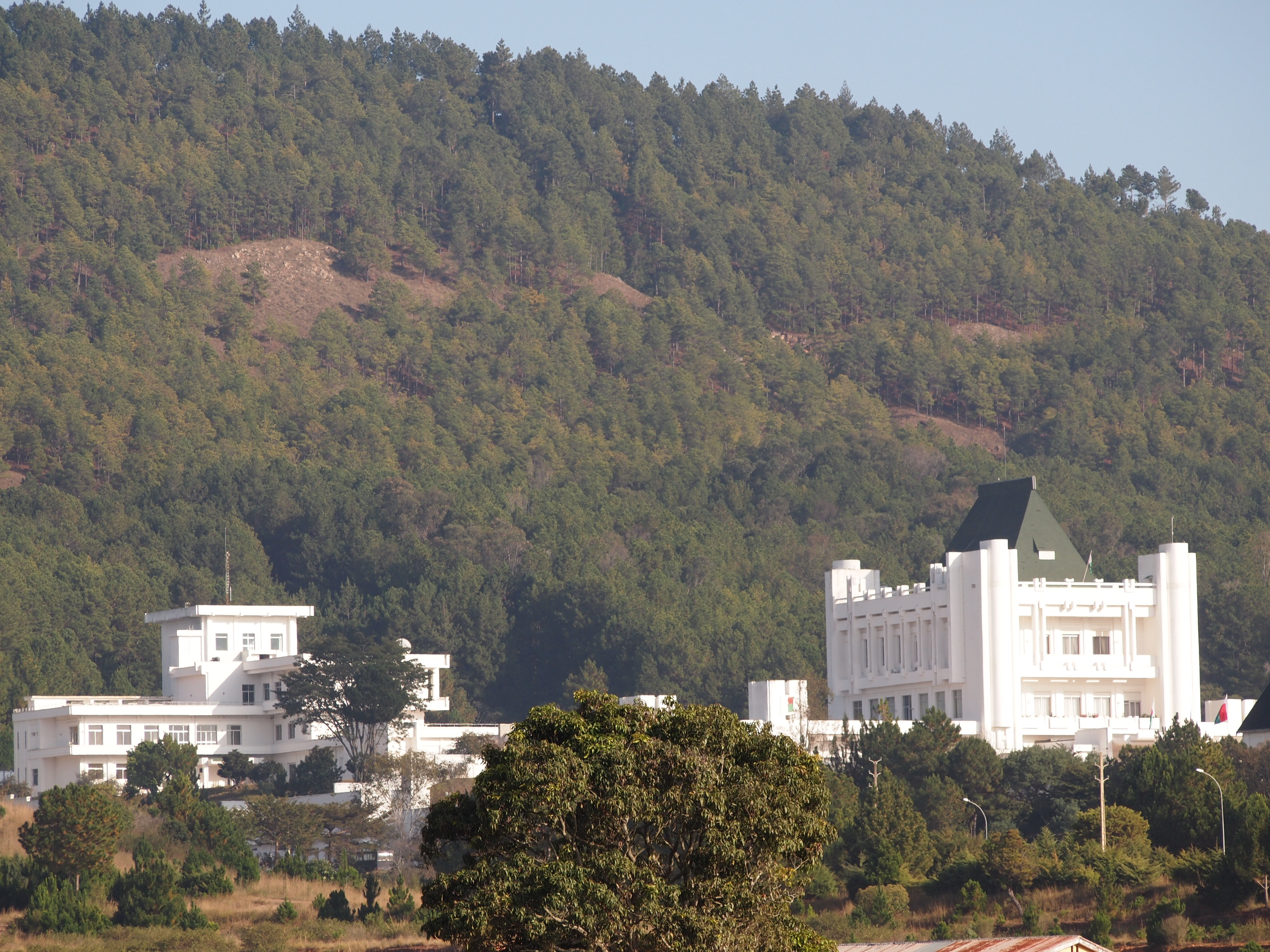
Iavoloha Palace was modeled on the Rova of Antananarivo.

Iavoloha Palace is the official residence of the President of Madagascar. It is situated 15 km (9.3 mi) to the south from the capital Antananarivo. Iavoloha was modeled on the Rova of Antananarivo and was built by North Korea in the 1970s for free.

== See also ==
- Ambohitsorohitra Palace, another office of the president
