= Special delegation =

French emergency administrative role

In France, a special delegation (French: délégation spéciale, [deleɡasjɔ̃ spesjal]) in a municipal organisation is a delegation of several members appointed by the prefect, acting as the local representative of the State, following the dissolution or resignation of a municipal council or another organisation to perform the functions of mayor or president. The powers of a special delegation are limited to acts of pure administration and emergency management.
