= Congress Party for the Independence of Madagascar =

Political party in Madagascar

Congress Party of the Independence of Madagascar Parti du Congrès de l'indépendance de Madagascar (French) Antokon'ny Kongresin'ny Fahaleovantenan'i Madagasikara (Malagasy)
- Founders: Richard Andriamanjato; Francis Sautron
- Founded: 8 November 1958
- Headquarters: Antananarivo
- Ideology: Communism; Marxism; Scientific socialism
- Political position: Left-wing
- National affiliation: AREMA
- International affiliation: IMCWP

AKFM badge

Party of the Independence Congress of Madagascar (French: Parti du Congrès de l'indépendance de Madagascar; Malagasy: Antokon'ny Kongresin'ny Fahaleovantenan'i Madagasikara) is a Marxist political party in Madagascar. AKFM was founded on November 8, 1958. One of the organizations that took part in the formation was the UPM of Francis Sautron. The founding president was Richard Andriamanjato, a Merina Protestant priest who had developed links to the French Communist Party. Throughout its history, AKFM has been dominated by Merinas. AKFM favored immediate independence. Initially, the party was mainly based in Antananarivo and Antsiranana.

The general secretary of AKFM 1960-1990 was Gisèle Rabesahala.

On October 11, 1959, AKFM won the municipal elections in Antananarivo. AKFM got 25 out of 37 seats. On the same day the list of AKFM and FISEMA won the municipal elections in Diégo-Suarez (now Antsiranana), where Sautron had been the mayor. AKFM-FISEMA got 19 out of 27 seats, and Sautron was reelected, mayor.

After 1976 AKFM was part of the ruling FNRD.

In March 1989, Andriamanjato broke away and formed the pro-Albert Zafy Party of the Independence Congress of Madagascar-Renewal.
