= Marc Ravalomanana =

President of Madagascar from 2002 to 2009

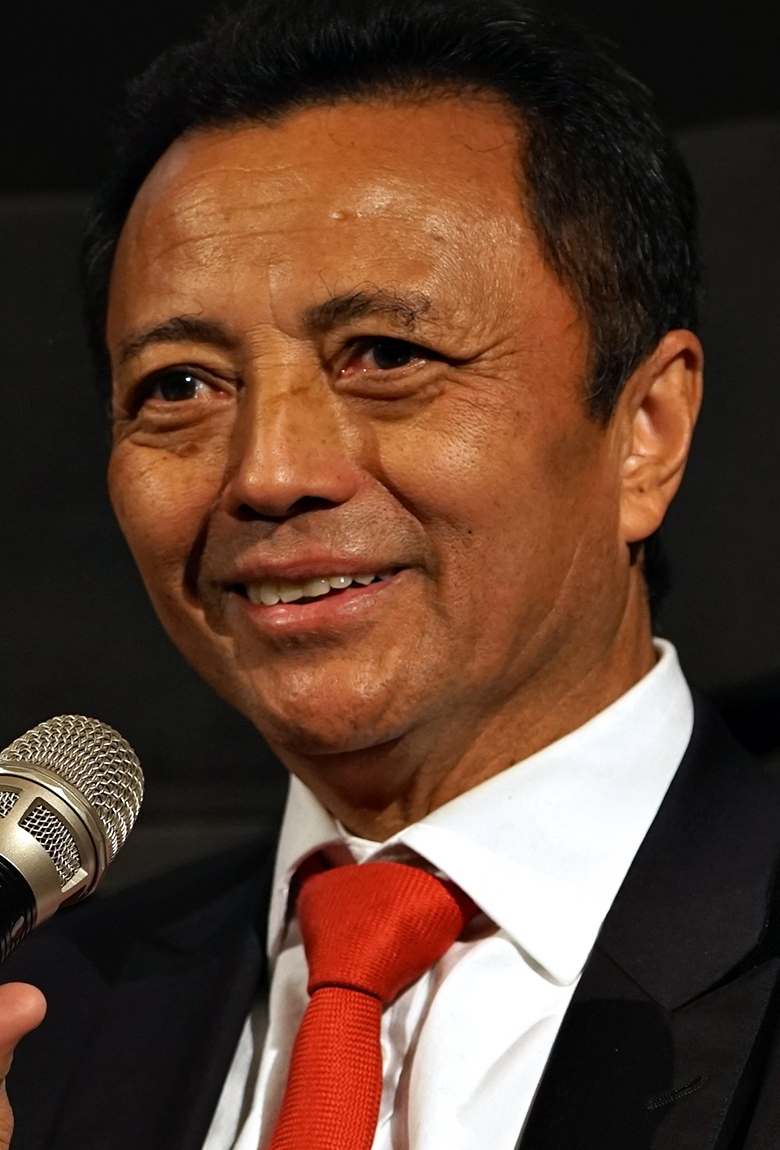
- Ravalomanana in 2017

6th President of Madagascar
- In office 5 July 2002 (Note: From 22 February 2002 based in Antananarivo.) – 17 March 2009
- Prime Minister: Tantely Andrianarivo; Jacques Sylla; Charles Rabemananjara
- Preceded by: Didier Ratsiraka
- Succeeded by: Hyppolite Ramaroson (as Head of the Military Directorate)

48th Mayor of Antananarivo
- In office 14 November 1999 – 6 May 2002
- Preceded by: Guy Razanamasy
- Succeeded by: Patrick Ramiaramanana

Personal details
- Born: 12 December 1949 (age 76) Imerinkasinina, French Madagascar
- Party: TIM (I Love Madagascar)
- Spouse: Lalao Ravalomanana (m. 1974)
- Children: 4

Marc Ravalomanana GCSK (Malagasy: [raˌvaluˈmananə̥]; born 12 December 1949) is a Malagasy politician who served as the sixth president of Madagascar from 2002 to 2009.

Born into a farming Merina family in Imerinkasinina, near the capital city of Antananarivo, Ravalomanana first rose to prominence as the founder and CEO of the vast dairy conglomerate TIKO, later launching successful wholesaler MAGRO and several additional companies.

He entered politics in 1999 by founding the Tiako Iarivo party and successfully ran for the position of mayor of Antananarivo, serving from 1999 to 2001. During his tenure, he improved sanitary and security conditions in the city. In August 2001, he announced his candidacy as an independent in the upcoming presidential election. He then took office as president in 2002 amidst a dispute over election results in which he successfully pressed his claim to have won a majority in the first round. Under the leadership of Jacques Sylla, Ravalomanana's prime minister from 2002 to 2007, the political party Tiako I Madagasikara (TIM) was founded in 2002 to support Ravalomanana's presidency and came to dominate legislative and local elections. Ravalomanana was re-elected in December 2006, again with a majority in the first round.

During Ravalomanana's presidency, Madagascar made significant advances toward development targets and experienced an average of seven per cent growth per year. His administration oversaw the construction of thousands of new schools and health clinics. Road rehabilitation aided in improving rural farmers' access to markets. The establishment of the independent anti-corruption agency BIANCO, and the adoption of diverse supporting policies resulted in a decline in governmental corruption.

Opposition members criticized Ravalomanana in the later period of his presidency, accusing him of increasing authoritarianism and the mixing of public and private interests. In addition, the benefits of the country's growth were not evenly spread, leading to increased wealth inequality, inflation and a decline in purchasing power for the lower and middle classes. In 2008 a controversial land lease agreement with Korean agricultural firm Daewoo, the purchase of a costly presidential jet and the closure of media channels owned by opposition leader and mayor of Antananarivo, Andry Rajoelina, strengthened popular disapproval of his policies. Rajoelina rallied popular support for the opposition, leading to a popular uprising that began in January 2009 and ended two months later with Ravalomanana's resignation under pressure and Rajoelina taking control with military support in a power transfer viewed by the international community as a coup d'état.

From 2009 to 2012 Ravalomanana lived in exile in South Africa, where he was engaged in active negotiations with Rajoelina and former heads of state Albert Zafy and Didier Ratsiraka to organize national elections. In December 2012 he declared he would not present himself as a candidate, then a precondition to the elections being viewed as legitimate by the international community. TGV candidate Hery Rajaonarimampianina was elected president in January 2014, defeating Jean-Louis Robinson, the candidate of Marc Ravalomanana's camp. Upon attempting to return to Madagascar in October 2014 he was arrested, having been sentenced in absentia to lifelong hard labour for abuses of power by the Rajoelina administration. After his sentence was lifted and he was freed from house arrest in May 2015, Ravalomanana announced the re-opening of the Tiko business group and was re-elected the president of TIM.

== Early years ==
Marc Ravalomanana was born on 12 December 1949 in the village of Imerinkasinina, 40 kilometres (25 mi) east of Antananarivo in Manjakandriana District. Ravalomanana's parents worked as peddlers before opening a small shop in a rural village in Tamatave Province. Ravalomanana's family origins are Merina, the island's largest and most politically prominent ethnic group.

From age five he began attending Anjeva Gara public primary school, located 4 kilometres (2.5 mi) from Imerinkasinina. He walked this distance daily, often departing early with baskets of watercress to sell to train passengers at the nearby station. He completed his upper primary private school in Ambohimalaza. After completing his primary studies he attended the Swedish missionary-run technical secondary school in Ambatomanga.

== Entrepreneur ==
Upon completing his studies, Ravalomanana returned to Manjakandriana District, where he and his family began making and selling homemade yogurts, a common artisanal product in the highlands region. On his bicycle, he collected milk from farmers in neighboring towns, gradually increasing his production and clientele. He opened his first yogurt and cheese production center in 1977 in Sambaina on land he named Rova-Tiko ("Tiko Palace"), where he would build the first Tiko factory several years later.

Ravalomanana solicited a loan from the Agence Française de Développement to further expand his business, but this request was denied, souring his view of France. His subsequent request to the World Bank for 1.5 million US dollars was approved, and in 1982 he founded the Tiko company. The representative of the World Bank to Madagascar at the time, Jose Bronfman, secured the loan with exceptionally favorable reimbursement conditions that enabled Ravalomanana to sell his products at a lower cost than other small dairy producers, which gradually put his most significant competitors out of business. Bronfman later left his post at the World Bank to become a principal investor in the company, joined by private investors from South Africa, Germany and the United States. As Tiko continued to grow, the entrepreneur began incorporating imported ingredients such as powdered milk from South Africa (constituting 80 per cent of the composition of Tiko dairy products) and surplus butter from Europe, further improving the profitability of his business and enabling additional diversification. Tiko Group first concentrated exclusively on the production of dairy products before expanding into fruit juices, ice cream, cooking oil and carbonated beverages. The Tiko slogan printed on many of the group's products, Vita Malagasy ("Made in Madagascar").

Ravalomanana cultivated political relationships to facilitate the continued growth of Tiko in spite of an economic climate non-conducive to free enterprise under the Socialist administration of Ratsiraka. Early support in the 1980s came from the Supreme Counselor of the Revolution Manandafy Rakotonirina, then-Minister of Finance Rakotovao Razakaboana, and another minister, Justin Rarivoson. By the mid-1980s, the profitability of his Tiko enterprise enabled Ravalomanana to purchase a costly villa formerly owned by French colonial governor Leon Reallon in the central Faravohitra neighborhood of Antananarivo.

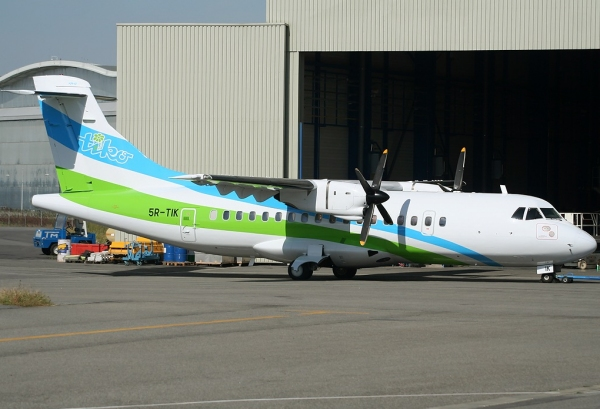
Distribution airplane owned by Tiko

In 1997, under the pretext of concern about mad cow disease, Ratsiraka obstructed Ravalomanana's plans to build a farm stocked with imported high-yield milk cows. Ravalomanana overcame the objection by breeding high-yield cows locally, thereby further boosting Tiko production. Later that same year, Ratsiraka's daughters began competing with Tiko by importing and reselling vegetable oil under the brand name "Eden". When Norbert Ratsirahonana declared himself a candidate in the 1997 presidential elections against Ratsiraka and Albert Zafy, Ravalomanana provided significant financial contributions to the Ratsirahonana campaign in return for tax exemptions on his edible oil products for a period of five years. The profits he consequently earned were reinvested to create the Magro wholesale company in 1998. By 2001, over a dozen principal warehouses throughout the country enabled widespread distribution of Tiko products to urban and rural areas, with a flagship warehouse in the Akorandrano neighborhood of Antananarivo.

The Ratsiraka administration launched an inquiry into Tiko business practices in September 2000 and issued an executive decision in June 2001 that the company should be shut down for failure to adhere to a 1996 agreement requiring Tiko to create jobs and produce low-cost vegetable oil; this ruling was overturned by the Supreme Court on 16 October 2002. A number of lawsuits have been filed over Ravalomanana's business practices, including a court judgment on the eve of the 2001 presidential election requiring the payment of between 200 and 363 billion Malagasy francs in Tiko back taxes, but all were either dismissed or ended in an out-of-court settlement; none resulted in a criminal conviction. At its height during the period of Ravalomanana's presidency, Tiko provided direct salaried employment to between 1,000 and 3,000 staff and indirect employment to over 10,000. The group was the largest dairy producer in the country and a leader in the national agribusiness sector. The success of his enterprises made Ravalomanana a wealthy man. In the mandatory self-disclosure of wealth submitted to the High Constitutional Court in 2000 by all presidential candidates, Ravalomanana declared ownership of 27 properties valued at over two billion Malagasy francs. He owned 90 per cent of Tiko Inc., 80 per cent of Tiko Agri and 50 per cent of Tiko Oil Products, a portfolio worth 13.1 billion Malagasy francs, and declared 77 million Malagasy francs in annual revenues. Vivier (2007) demonstrates that the valuation of Ravalomanana's holdings and his annual revenue in particular were significantly underestimated.

== Mayor of Antananarivo ==
In 1999, Ravalomanana ran as an independent candidate in the local elections, spending over $110,000 on his campaign—a level of expense then unheard of in a Malagasy mayoral race. He was elected with 45 per cent of the votes. His tenure stretched from December 1999 to his ascent to the Presidential office in May 2002. During his time as mayor, he balanced the city's budget and improved its water quality and waste management, and drew criticism for an urban-restoration project that demolished houses that were still being lived in. He has been described as one of the most popular mayors in Antananarivo's history.

== Presidency ==
=== Presidential election of 2001 ===
Ravalomanana ran for president in the election to be held on 16 December 2001. His campaign promoted his image as a self-made man who would draw upon his business to develop the country and played upon his youth (aged 52) and his non-alliance with the elderly "political dinosaurs" who had dominated politics over the previous three decades. His origins as a village farmer inspired support among rural voters, who made up over four-fifths of the population. Many voters wished to see established in Madagascar in place of corrupt power networks dominated by nepotism. The Council of Christian Churches of Madagascar (FFKM) rallied behind Ravalomanana.

Ravalomanana's announcement sparked retaliatory actions by the Ratsiraka administration, resulting in frequent defamatory attacks in the press and a court judgment fining him 300 billion Malagasy francs (55.6 million Euros) in relation to his management of Tiko, which were later settled out of court. These attacks were denounced by spokesmen for Ravalomanana's campaign, Tiako iMadagasikara (TIM), and in speeches the candidate delivered in urban and rural areas across the island, by his considerable personal wealth and the airplane and seven helicopters registered to Tiko.

October 2001 polls showed Ravalomanana ahead of Ratsiraka. Following the December election, official results put Ravalomanana in first place, with 46 per cent, against Ratsiraka's 40 per cent; without a majority. Ravalomanana, claiming to have won a majority in the first round, refused to participate in a run-off and after a recount, on 29 April 2002 the High Constitutional Court declared that Ravalomanana had won 51.3 percent of the vote, enough for a narrow first-round victory. The court's decision was contested by Ratsiraka and his supporters. Some Ratsiraka supporters, mostly of the Betsimisaraka people, cut off routes from the port city of Tamative to the mostly Merina Antananarivo, initiating a months-long period of sporadic ethnic and political violence until Ratsiraka's July 2002 concession of the race and exile to France.

=== First term ===
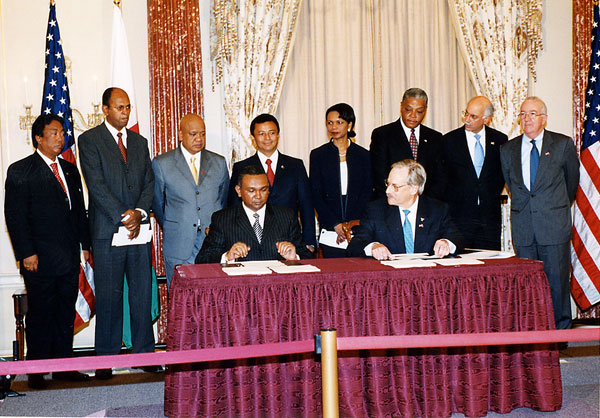
Ravalomanana and former U.S. Secretary of State Condoleezza Rice

Upon election to the presidency, Ravalomanana sought to mitigate the negative economic impact of the eight-month political standoff with Ratsiraka, which had cost Madagascar millions of dollars He enacted a series of new laws, policies and reforms that sought to efface remaining traces of Ratsiraka's socialist ideology and replace it with a firmly capitalist, market-driven economic environment. The new head of state moved away from reliance on its principal trading partner, France, and cultivated relationships with partners such as Germany, the United States and South Korea as part of his strategy for Madagascar's economic development. In 2004 the World Bank approved his administration's Poverty Reduction Strategy Paper, entitled Madagascar Naturellement (Madagascar Naturally).

Protected natural areas were tripled on the island from 1.6 million hectares (6,200 sq mi) to 6 million hectares (23,000 sq mi) – ten per cent of the country's land surface – over five years. In 2004 he established the Bureau Indépendant Anti-Corruption (BIANCO), leading to a decline in government corruption. That same year, the International Monetary Fund agreed to write off half Madagascar's debt. In 2005 Madagascar became the first country to benefit from the Millennium Challenge Account, a new development fund managed by the United States.

Consequently, the economy grew at an average annual rate of seven per cent throughout his presidency. Under his administration, hundreds of kilometers of roads were paved in formerly isolated rural areas. Dramatic improvements in education and health were also achieved under his administration., thousands of new primary schools and additional classrooms were constructed, older buildings were renovated and tens of thousands of new primary teachers were recruited and trained. Primary school fees were eliminated and kits containing basic school supplies were distributed to primary students. Logging in protected areas was outlawed until January 2009.

Also after being elected in 2002, Ravalomanana remained a prominent player in the private sector. The 2003 privatisation of SINPA (Societe d'lnteret National Malgache des Produits Agricoles), the state agricultural corporation, and SOMACODIS (Société Malgache de Collecte et de Distribution), the national trading corporation, provided Ravalomanana the opportunity to purchase both entities, which he incorporated under Tiko. He also created a public roads construction company, Asa Lalana Malagasy.

The benefits of economic growth during the Ravalomanana administration were not evenly distributed, leading to higher costs of living for all Malagasy and a deepening poverty among much of the population with fewer able to increase their wealth. Detractors indicate a decline in purchasing power and dramatic inflation early in Ravalomanana's presidency as evidence of a failure to reduce poverty. Ravalomanana's critics remarked that the greatest beneficiary of his reforms and policies was the president himself, giving the example of road construction projects that enabled Tiko to distribute more efficiently as well as the farmers and other small businesspeople targeted by the initiative. Furthermore, his own companies tended to be awarded most of the government contracts for which they bid, although this occurred transparently and legally, due to a weak legal framework around conflict of interest. Critics condemned his tendency to make unilateral decisions and disregard the views of his entourage, a number of whom resigned or were dismissed. Many joined an opposition movement that had gained considerable strength by late 2007.

On 18 November 2006, Ravalomanana's jet was forced to divert from Madagascar's capital during a return trip from Europe following reports of a coup underway in Antananarivo and shooting near the airport. The attempted coup by General Andrianafidisoa was ultimately unsuccessful.

=== Presidential election of 2006 ===
Ravalomanana ran for a second term in the presidential election held on 3 December 2006. According to official results, he won the election with 54.79 per cent of the vote in the first round. In Antananarivo Province he won 75.39% of voters.

=== Second term ===
During his second term, Ravalomanana oversaw revisions to the Poverty Reduction Strategy Paper. Renamed the Madagascar Action Plan (MAP), this new strategy was intended to build on the successes of his first term to accelerate and expand national development. The plan focused on "the eight commitments": accountable governance, more extensive and interconnected infrastructure, agriculture based rural development, family planning and health (particularly fighting HIV/AIDS), strong economic growth, environmental protection, and the traditional principle of fihavanana (solidarity). The plan's targets were aligned with the United Nations' Millennium Development Goals.

As construction of schools and hiring of teachers continued in Ravalomanana's second term, additional measures were adopted to improve education quality, including a shift to Malagasy as the language of instruction in grades one to five, expansion of primary schools to house grades six and seven for greater access to lower secondary schooling In the Constitution of 2007, English was added to Malagasy and French as an official language.

In the later half of his second term, Ravalomanana was criticized by domestic and international observers, who accused him of increasing authoritarianism and corruption.

=== Confrontation with Rajoelina ===
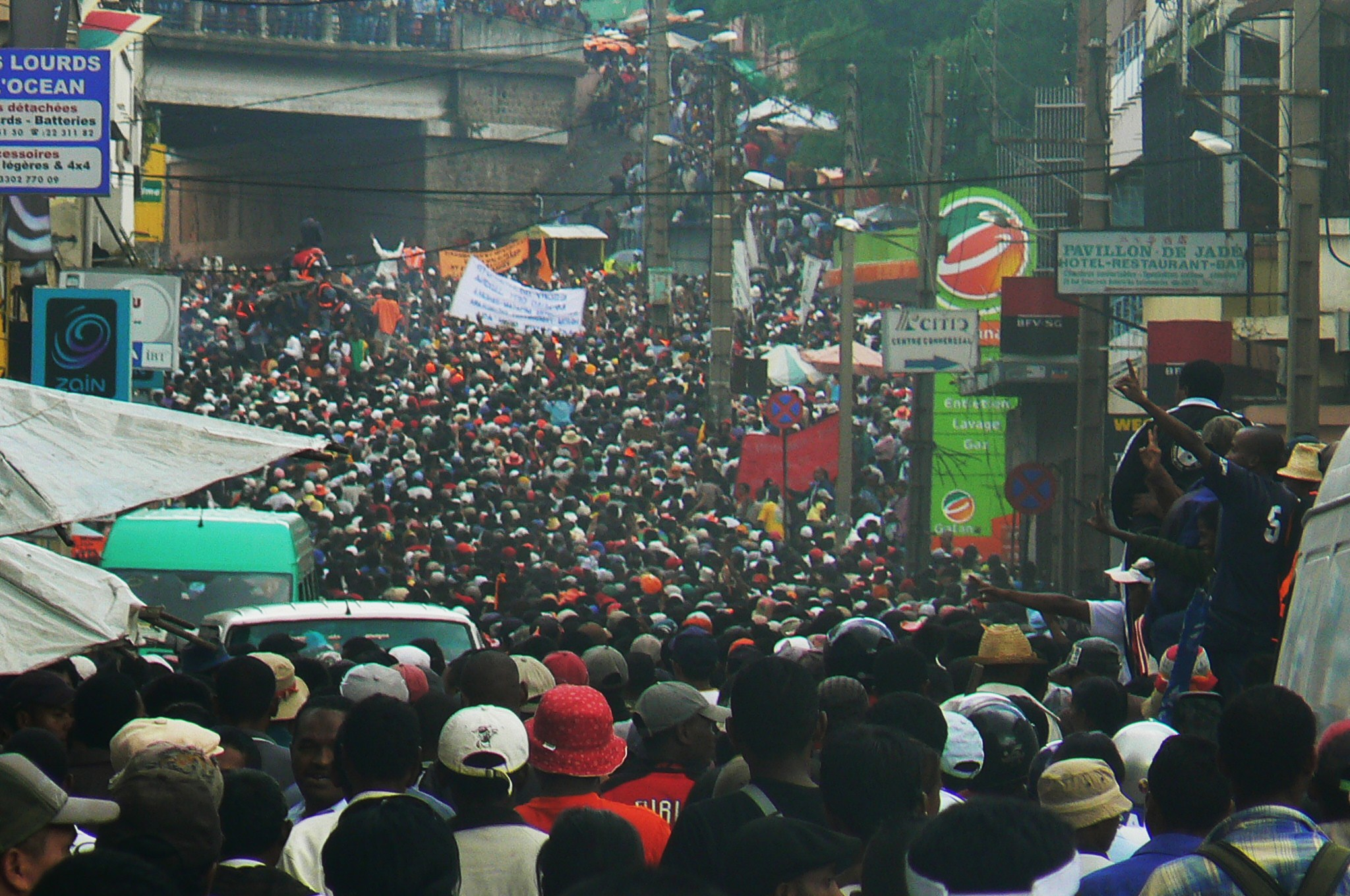
Political protests in Antananarivo, January 2009

On 13 December 2008, the government closed Viva TV, owned by mayor of Antananarivo Andry Rajoelina, stating that a Viva interview with exiled former head of state Didier Ratsiraka was "likely to disturb peace and security". This move catalyzed the political opposition and a public already dissatisfied with other recent actions undertaken by Ravalomanana, including a July 2008 deal with Daewoo Logistics to lease half the island's arable land for South Korean cultivation of corn and palm oil, and the November 2008 purchase of a second presidential jet at a cost of 60 million U.S. dollars. Within a week, Rajoelina met with twenty of Madagascar's most prominent opposition leaders (referred in the press as the "Club of 20"), to develop a joint statement demanding that the Ravalomanana administration improves its adherence to democratic principles. The demand was broadcast at a press conference, where Rajoelina promised to dedicate a politically open public space in the capital, which he would call Place de la democratie ("Democracy Square").

Beginning in January 2009, Rajoelina led a series of political rallies in downtown Antananarivo where he gave voice to the frustration that Ravalomanana's policies had triggered, particularly among the economically marginalized and members of the political opposition. On 3 February, Ravalomanana dismissed Rajoelina as mayor of Antananarivo and appointed a special delegation. Rajoelina incited demonstrators on 7 February to occupy the president's office. The presidential guard opened fire on the advancing crowd, killing 31 and wounding more than 200.

Popular disapproval of Ravalomanana intensified, conflicts between pro-Rajoelina demonstrators and security forces continued over the following weeks, resulting in several additional deaths. On 11 March, following a declaration of neutrality by army leadership, pro-opposition soldiers from the Army stormed the army headquarters and forced the army chief of staff to resign. Over the next several days the army deployed forces to enable the opposition to occupy key ministries, the chief of military police transferred his loyalty to Rajoelina and the army sent tanks against the presidential Iavoloha Palace. Rajoelina rejected Ravalomanana's offer on 15 March to hold a national referendum. The following day, the army stormed the Ambohitsorohitra Palace and captured the Central Bank. Hours later, Ravalomanana transferred his power to a group of senior army personnel. Ravalomanana later declared he had been forced at gunpoint to relinquish power. A military council would have been charged with organizing elections within 24 months and re-writing the constitution for the "Fourth Republic". However, Vice Admiral Hyppolite Ramaroson announced on 18 March that the council would transfer power directly to Rajoelina, making him president of the opposition-dominated High Transitional Authority (HAT) that he had appointed weeks earlier.

With the military's backing Rajoelina was sworn in as president on 21 March at Mahamasina Municipal Stadium before a crowd of 40,000 supporters, a transfer of power that was considered illegitimate and unconstitutional by the international community and described as a coup d'état.

== Post-presidency ==
After coming to power, Rajoelina's HAT pursued legal action against Ravalomanana. On 2 June 2009, Ravalomanana was fined 70 million US dollars (42 million British pounds) and sentenced to four years in prison for alleged abuse of office which, according to HAT Justice Minister Christine Razanamahasoa, included the December 2008 purchase of a presidential jet worth $60 million. Razanamahasoa claimed Ravalomanana "mixed public interests with his personal interests".

=== Exile ===
The former head of state was in exile in Swaziland at the time, having been prevented from returning to Madagascar the previous month. Additionally, on 28 August, Ravalomanana was sentenced in absentia to hard labour for life for his role in the protests and ensuing deaths. Ravalomanana's Tiko Group faced heavy pressure from the transitional government, which in April 2009 demanded that the company pay 35 million US dollars in back taxes or risk being shut down.

Both Ravalomanana and Rajoelina were requested by the Southern African Development Community (SADC) to renounce participation in the 2013 Malagasy presidential elections in order to end the ongoing political crisis. On 10 December 2012, Ravalomanana announced that he would not participate in the elections, and encouraged Rajoelina to follow.

=== Presidential elections 2018 ===
Marc Ravalomanana was a candidate in the Malagasy presidential election of 2018. He qualified for the 2nd round with 35.35% of the votes. He lost the 2nd round with 44.34% of the votes against Andry Rajoelina with 55.66% of the votes.

=== Presidential elections 2023 ===
Marc Ravalomanana ran as a candidate at the 2023 Malagasy presidential elections.

== Other activities ==
Ravalomanana is a fervent Christian. As a young adult he gradually took on increasingly responsible leadership roles within his church community. In 2000 he was elected vice-president of the FJKM.

Ravalomanana owns media group Malagasy Broadcasting System (MBS), which operates radio and television stations. He speaks English fluently.

== Honours ==
=== National honours ===
- Madagascar:
  - Grand Cross, First Class of the National Order of Madagascar

=== Foreign honours ===
- Germany:
  - Grand Cross Special Class of the Order of Merit of the Federal Republic of Germany (2006)
- Mauritius:
  - Grand Commander of the Most Distinguished Order of the Star and Key of the Indian Ocean (2008)

=== Honorary degrees ===
- Honorary Doctorate from University of Antananarivo (2007)
- Honorary Doctorate of Law from Abilene Christian University, Texas (2008)

== See also ==
- List of heads of the executive by approval rating

== Notes ==
Political offices
| Preceded by Guy Razanamasy | Mayor of Antananarivo; 1999–2002 | Succeeded by Patrick Ramiaramanana |
| Preceded by Didier Ratsiraka | President of Madagascar; 2002–2009 | Succeeded by Hyppolite Ramaroson as Head of the Military Directorate |
