= Law enforcement in Madagascar =

The responsibility for enforcing the law in Madagascar is the responsibility of multiple agencies. The main organizations that perform law enforcement tasks are the Malagasy National Gendarmerie and Malagasy National Police. The Malagasy National Gendarmerie receives assistance in carrying out some of its responsibilities from the Malagasy Armed Forces, who is responsible for combating banditry and cattle theft in rural areas. Malagasy Law enforcement agencies may also receive assistance from the Malagasy General Directorate of Presidential Security (French: la Direction générale de la Sécurité Présidentielle) in performing investigations into individuals and or organizations who pose a threat to the Malagasy President's safety or the security of the Presidency's assets located in the capital city, Antananarivo and the Provinces. The law enforcement agencies of Madagascar include:

== Malagasy National Gendarmerie ==
The Malagasy National Gendarmerie (Malagasy: Zandarimaria Nasionaly; ZN) is a branch of the Malagasy Armed Forces under the Ministry of National Defense and under the direct responsibility of the Secretary of State for the Gendarmerie. It is responsible for performing law enforcement duties in rural areas, protecting government facilities, providing executive protection for members of national and foreign institutions, performing sensitive escort operations, acting as a Provost for the country's military, and running a maritime police contingent. The Malagasy National Police has 8,100 personnel. The Malagasy National Gendarmerie was first established on May 14, 1960, by Decree No. 606102 under the name Zandarimaria Nasionaly (Z N), which combined the Madagascar Guard and the Malagasy gendarmes serving in the French gendarmerie.

== Malagasy National Police ==
The Malagasy National Police is a national law enforcement agency overseen by the Ministry of Public Security. Some of its responsibilities include performing law enforcement tasks in urban areas, maintaining international relations with other countries and international organizations to assist it in fighting against cross-border common crimes, maintaining public order, monitoring and controlling immigration and emigration, and combating cross-border movement of prohibited or regulated people and goods. The Malagasy National Police can trace its roots to the Directorate of the National Police in the Ministry of the Interior, created during the time of the Malagasy Republic, on September 31, 1961.

== Financial Intelligence Unit ==
The Financial Intelligence Unit of Madagascar (Malagasy: Service de Renseignement Financier Malagasy, SAMIFIN) is a national law enforcement agency that is responsible for combating illicit financial flows linked to money laundering activities, terrorism funding, economic and funding infractions, and organized crime. It is subordinate to the President of Madagascar. It was established on July 18, 2007, by Malagasy President Marc Ravalomanana through Decree 2007–510.

== Independent Anti-Corruption Bureau ==
The Independent Anti-Corruption Bureau (IACB, French: Bureau Indépendant Anti-Corruption, BIANCO) is an independent national agency that is responsible for preventing corruption by identifying risks in procedures and systems in the public and private sectors, recommending law and procedural reforms and providing advice for improving existing policies and procedures, educating the public about corruption and why it is important to fight it, mobilizing public support to help combat corruption, performing investigations into corruption and related offenses in order to effectively enforce the anti-corruption law. It was founded on September 1, 2004, by Law No. 2004-030 of September 9, 2004.

== Central Intelligence Service ==
The Central Intelligence Service (CIS, Malagasy: Sampan-draharahan'ny Sampam-pitsikilovana Foibe) is a national intelligence agency that is responsible for the collecting, researching, and using information to inform the President of the Republic to base their decisions on for the protection of the Madagascar's interests, perform judicial indagations into criminal associations related to terrorist activities and similar crimes, establish and maintain operational and technical relations with foreign government services and organizations. It is subordinate to the President of Madagascar. It was established on July 3, 2003, during the administration of Malagasy President Marc Ravalomanana.

== See also ==
- Gendarmerie
- List of gendarmeries
- List of law enforcement agencies
- List of secret police organizations

== Sources ==
- World Police Encyclopedia, ed. by Dilip K. Das & Michael Palmiotto published by Taylor & Francis. 2004,
- World Encyclopedia of Police Forces and Correctional Systems, second edition, Gale., 2006
- Sullivan, Larry E. Encyclopedia of Law Enforcement. Thousand Oaks: Sage Publications, 2005.
- International Institute for Strategic Studies (12 February 2025). The Military Balance 2025. London: Routledge. ISBN 978-1-003-63076-0.
