= Malagasy National Gendarmerie =

Malagasy law enforcement agency

The Malagasy National Gendarmerie (Malagasy: Zandarimaria Nasionaly; ZN) is one of the national law enforcement agencies in Madagascar. The Malagasy National Gendarmerie is a military force under the Ministry of National Defense and under the direct responsibility of the Secretary of State for the Gendarmerie. The Malagasy National Gendarmerie and Malagasy Armed Forces are responsible for executing law enforcement tasks in rural areas, protecting government facilities, and running a maritime police contingent, while the Malagasy National Police is responsible for performing law enforcement tasks in urban areas.

== Functions ==
The ZN's functions include:

- Search for offences under criminal law
- Observe these activities
- Gather evidence of these actions
- Search for the perpetrators
- Perform intelligence operations
- Act as a traffic police force
- Act as a air, border and port police force
- Act as a tourism police force
- Provide security services
- Provide civil protection
- Parry out rescue operations
- Perform law enforcement operations
- Perform sensitive escort operations
- Carry out interventions in the context of judicial operations
- Provide executive protection for members of national and foreign institutions
- Protect sensitive locations
- Operational Defense of the Territory
- Act as a Provost for the country's military
- Participate regional and international peacekeeping

== History ==
=== Early history ===
During the first Madagascar expedition of the Franco-Hova Wars in 1883, a provost detachment from the French military arrived in Madagascar. Between 1895 and 1896, the French Expeditionary Corps arrived in Madagascar and established a provost detachment. In 1901, a detachment was established in the French Colonial Gendarmerie. In 1902, it became a Gendarmerie company, which was dissolved in 1904. In 1931, the gendarmerie company was reestablished as the East African Gendarmerie detachment (French: détachement de la Gendarmerie de l’Afrique Orientale). It was renamed the French East Africa Gendarmerie Group (French: Groupement de Gendarmerie de l’Afrique Orientale française) in 1957, then named the Overseas Zone Gendarmerie No. 3 (French: Gendarmerie de la Zone d’Outre-mer N° 3) in 1959, and then it was called the Overseas Gendarmerie District Inspectorate No. 3 (French: Inspection de l’arrondissement de la Gendarmerie d’Outre-mer N° 3).

The participation of Malagasy natives in policing went through several stages. First, an Indigenous Civil Guard (French: Garde Civile Indigène), that acted as a militia, was established in 1896. In 1902, the Indigenous Civil Guard became the regional police (French: Police Régionale), which was staffed by 2,500 men. In 1903, it became the regional guard (French: Garde Régionale). In 1906, the regional guard became the Native Guard of Madagascar and Dependencies (French: Garde Indigène de Madagascar et Dépendances) that was staffed by 3,000 men. In 1950, the Native Guard of Madagascar and Dependencies became the Guard of Madagascar (French: Garde de Madagascar). In 1958, the Guard of Madagascar became the Auxiliary Guards of the Gendarmerie (French: Gardes Auxiliaires de Gendarmerie).

=== Independence and official formation of the gendarmerie ===
On May 14, 1960, the Malagasy National Gendarmerie was created by Decree No. 606102 under the name Zandarimaria Nasionaly (Z N), which combined the Madagascar Guard and the Malagasy gendarmes serving in the French gendarmerie. In 1969, Lieutenant Colonel Richard Ratsimandrava became the first Malagasy commander of the Malagasy National Gendarmerie. In 1975, the gendarmerie's name was changed to ZANDARIMARIAM-PIRENENA (ZP). In 1996, the SEG was created to assume command of the Gendarmerie, which was led by Brigadier General ANDRIAMANANTSOA Guy. However, the SEG was dissolved in 2002 and the Superior Command of the National Gendarmerie (French: Commandement Supérieur de la Gendarmerie Nationale) was established.

In 2003, the Gendarmerie command's name was reverted back to SEG. In 2009, the position of Secretariat of State for the National Gendarmerie was reestablished. On March 22, 2009, eighteen commanders from the dog command from the ZN took part in a ten kilometer hike from the Escapara Ivato Station to Mandrosoa, Ambohidratrimo, Ialanana, Bout de piste, Antsambilo and Mamory-Ivato ran by the Association of Dog Commanders of the National Gendarmerie (AMCSGN). It was done to raise awareness of the existence of this organization in Madagascar and demonstrate the Malagasy National Gendarmerie's dog command's work to the public. Another event was planned to happen in July 2009 to further demonstrate the dog command's skills in dog handling to the public.

=== 2010 FIGN attempted coup d'état ===
On May 19, 2010, the National Gendarmerie Intervention Forces (FIGN), led by Colonel Raymond Andrianjafy, started a protest movement over demanding release of the results of an investigation into the embezzlement of 2.5 billion Fmg (about 961,000 euros) that former Malagasy President Marc Ravalomanana said to have given to the National Gendarmerie in the beginning of 2009. The FIGN blamed their former second in command, General Bruno Razafindrakoto, who became commander of the national gendarmerie shortly after Andry Rajoelina took power, in March 2009, for not having redistributed this money. The FIGN released a statement in front of the Mausoleum of Malagasy Nationalist Heroes in Antananarivo, calling on the local population of Antananarivo to support their cause participating in a protest scheduled on May 20, 2010. FIGN also condemned the violence against civilians and various arbitrary arrests that they said was being perpetrated by the transition regime and supported the protests held by the Religious Leaders' Movement (Hetsiky ny Mpitondra Fivavahana, HMF). They also wanted to protect a protest being held on May 20, 2010 by Movement of Ecclesiastics, a movement made of Protestant pastors who supported Ravalomanana.

On May 20, 2010, the FIGN started setting up barricades on the roads leading to their camp in Fort-Duchesne Antananarivo as they were anticipating they would get attacked from outside their base. Around 11:45 RET, the FIGN got into a shootout with the Malagasy Army and the Malagasy National Gendarmerie, which occurred when the army and gendarmerie forces attempted to dismantle the roadblocks put up by the FIGN. The Army and Gendarmerie took over the FIGN barracks where the FIGN gendarmes were entrenched, which when that happened the FIGN gendarmes fled. The clash left three people dead and six people wounded, at least three of which were civilians that were treated by the Malagasy Red Cross.

The leader of the FIGN, General Viennot Zafera, described what happened as a coup d'état. A press conference was held and Prime Minister General Camille Vital, was accompanied by a number of leaders of the Malagasy security forces, said that they had the situation is under control. They did not say the exact number of FIGN gendarmes who fled when the army and gendarmerie attacked their barracks, but they did say that an investigation into what happened had begun and that there would be arrests of the gendarmes who rebelled as well as the civilians and religious officials who supported them and incited them to mutiny. During the press conference, the Malagasy police begun to seize the equipment of the Reformed Church radio station, the main station that had delivered the FIGN's appeal to the public. They also questioned three journalist's radio stations. The Prime Minister blamed the politicians for the mutiny of the gendarmes of the National Gendarmerie Intervention Force (FIGN).

=== 2025 Malagasy protests, coup d'état and recent history ===
The Malagasy National Gendarmerie's Special Security and Intervention Group assisted in providing training to twenty-nine journalists as part of a training seminar was initiated by the United Nations Educational, Scientific and Cultural Organization (UNESCO), done in collaboration with Aye-Aye Production and financed by the United Nations Peacebuilding Fund (UN-PBF). They were taught about the annals of the law on gender-based violence: a text was already adopted at that time but not yet applied, the relations of journalists with the police, and cybersecurity. The journalists also received physical training with bulletproof vests, helmets and riot shields.

The Malagasy National Gendarmerie was utilized during the 2025 Malagasy protests and the 2025 Malagasy coup d'état that occurred at the end of the protests. On September 25, 2025, starting at 5:30 am., police and gendarmerie units were deployed in Antananarivo to patrol the city and cordon off numerous streets that lead to the city center. At 10:45 am., tear gas started being deployed against the nonviolent protesters. Rubber bullets were also employed. Security and Special Intervention Group (GSIS) was reported to have drove one of their vehicles into a white 4x4 and started shooting at the protesters. Around nightfall the gendarmerie withdrew from the area, which resulted in looting occurring throughout the city.

On October 11, 2025, the Madagascar Armed Forces' Administrative and Technical Services Personnel Administration Corps (French: Corps d'Administration du Personnel des Services Administratifs et Techniques, CAPSAT) joined the protesters and criticized the gendarmerie and police for their actions during the protests, which caused several deaths; calling on the other military units and law enforcement agencies to join them. In response, a gendarmerie regiment loyal to Malagasy President Andry Rajoelina launched an attack on the base where CARSAT was based out of. CAPSAT soldiers clashed with them as they exited the base to join the protesters in Place du 13 Mai in Antananarivo. However, on the same day, Brigadier General Mamelison Mbina Nonos of the FIGN assumed command of the National Gendarmerie and stated that all gendarmerie units would receive their orders only from the Fort-Duchesne camp, the headquarters of the FIGN. In a statement, Nonos said that he apologized for actions that happened during some of the recent events and praised the protesters, particularly ones that were part of Generation Z. He also ordered the gendarmerie cease any disproportionate uses of force. On the morning of October 12, 2025, some officers from the gendarmerie released a video that acknowledged that some of the gendarmeries actions during the protests and called for cooperation between the gendarmerie and the Malagasy army. They stated that going forward all of the gendarmerie's orders came from the gendarmerie's headquarters.

On January 21, 2026, the Malagasy National Police and the Malagasy National Gendarmerie signed a security agreement with the Central Bank of Madagascar (French: Banque centrale de Madagascar, BCM), which stated that the Malagasy National Police's Special Intervention Unit would be responsible for escorting funds from the bank transported to their destinations on the road instead of the Malagasy National Gendarmerie who was previously responsible for performing that task. The Malagasy National Gendarmerie participated in some sports events and operational demonstrations to celebrate Madagascar's independence day in 2026. During a military show that was held in the afternoon of June 20, 2026 at the Makis stadium in Andohatapenaka, the ZN performed a tracking and search demonstration to show the work its dog squads do. A joint demonstration performed by the Malagasy National Police, Malagasy National Gendarmerie, and Malagasy Armed Forces simulated a counterterrorism and hostage rescue operation.

== Notable operations and incidents ==
On December 26, 2020, a large group of people attacked gendarmerie barracks in Imerintsiatosika. The clash resulted in one person being killed, three gendarmes getting injured, five motorcycles getting burned, which two belonged to the local Brigade and three belonged to staff members who worked there, and fifty percent of the barracks getting destroyed. The gendarmes that were present at the barracks during the attack defended the barracks by shooting in the air and deploying tear gas. Additionally, intervention uni9ts from Antananarivo and Arivonimamo were also sent there to reinforce the gendarmes onsite and help to defend the barracks. On December 27, 2020, the gendarmerie announced that they had arrested six people who were suspected to have taken part in the attack on the barracks.

The gendarmerie indicated that it believed that the attack was done to avenge the death of an individual, who the local populace of Imerintsiatosika believe was not involved in the crime and was killed by gunfire from the gendarmes, while they were chasing some burglars. The gendarmerie rejected this claim. They indicated they received a call for help from the victims of an attack and the gendarmes went to the scene. Their arrival prompted the criminals to flee, which led to a chase taking place. Upon seeing the elements of the police, the individual jumped and fell from the fence of a house, head first. The individual was seriously injured, which caused his death on the way to the hospital and led the gendarmerie asserted That individual would not have been shot.

On August 29, 2022, a mob, some of which were armed with machetes, blades, and sticks, gathered at gendarmerie station in Ikongo to try to get the gendarmerie release the four kidnapping suspects so they could punish them for kidnapping an albino child and murdering his mother. The ZN set up security perimeter around the gendarmerie barracks, and said they could talk to prevent bloodshed. The gendarmerie refused to release the suspects to the crowd and fired tear gas into the crowd to try to disperse them. The mob attempted to storm the facility and threw stones at the gendarmes, which the ZN responded to by opening fire on the crowd. Reinforcements were sent to the area to assist the gendarmerie to restore order. Nineteen people were killed and twenty-one people were injured during the attack.

General Andry Rakotondrazaka, the commander of the national gendarmerie at the time, said the killings were being investigated. The Malagasy President Andry Rajoelina appealed to the public to remain calm and confirmed that the incident would be investigated. Marc Ravalomanana, who served as Madagascar's president between 2002 and 2009 and lead the opposition party, Tiako I Madagasikara, accused the government of committing state terrorism. The national police chief defended the officers, saying they acted in self-defense. Communications Minister and government spokesperson Lalatiana Rakotondrazafy described Ravalomanana's comments as being a provacation and disputed his assertion that the incident being "state terrorism" without him providing any details about the circumstances surrounding the incident. Lalatiana said that the incident in Ikongo was regrettable.

On September 2, at around 5 a.m., the attack perpetrated by the dahalo occurred in the fokontany of Ankijabe, commune of Bemanonga, district of Morondava. They came there to attack the cattle and goat breeding farm, run by a French foreign national by the name of Patrick Joseph Agopian, who was the director of the company SPAM Sarl. A shootout took place during which resulted in the deaths of the director, a village security guard, and one of the attackers. The criminals fled the premises, bringing 151 heads of cattle with them. Members of the fokonolona, supported by village security agents, proceeded to pursue them. Other cattle incidents were reported on the same day in the municipalities of Analaiva and Amanga.

The gendarmes from the Morondava company were alerted to what had transpired a few minutes later and deployed to the scene. An emergency meeting of the Joint Design Body (l’Organisme mixte de conception, OMC) at the Menabe regional level was held. After receiving word that the dahalo had fled to the east, moving towards the Mahabo district, the Joint Design Body decided to mobilize the security forces composed of elements of the Morondava gendarmerie company led it and the Malaimbandy SWAC, soldiers from the Tsiribihina Defence and Security Zone (ZDS) as well as police officers from the National Police Intervention Force to join the pursuit. The OMC made this decision in response to an increase organized crime activities in the locality and to speed up the hunt for criminals. Three successive clashes took place in the commune of Analaiva.

Other cattle incidents were reported on the same day in the municipalities of Analaiva and Amanga. One occurred in the fokontany of Ankilamantsy-Bezeky, commune of Analaiva, district of Morondava. A shootout occurred there. A senior gendarme and 13 dahalo were killed and the commander of the Morondava gendarmerie company and a soldier were wounded in that incident. Security forces continued pursuing them to try to arrest them and free the remaining cattle. At the time these articles were written, the authorities were still searching for their accomplices. The Secretary of State in charge of the National Gendarmerie launched a large-scale operation with the army in Menabe to restore peace to the area. In response to these incidents, local authorities implemented a curfew between 9 pm. to 6 am. in the districts of Morondava and Mahabo.

On April 6, 2025, at 10:45 pm., the gendarmerie brigade based in Brieville was alerted that six individuals, including two carrying military grade weapons and three equipped with hunting rifles, had abducted a thirty-five-year-old man in the fokontany of Ambohitranivo, a rural commune of Brieville. The kidnappers initially traveled north, before turning south to serve as a diversion. The gendarmerie brigade mobilized an intervention group made up of 15 gendarmes and elements of the Special Operational Battle-Hardening Center (Centre spécial d’aguerrissement opérationnel, CSAO) Andriamena and deployed them to the southern areas the criminals could have traveled through. The combined pressure of the police and the fokonolona, the kidnappers finally released their hostage at 11:42 p.m., northeast of the fokontany of Ambohimaranitra, which is also located in Brieville. The victim was able to safely return to his family, which the rapid release of the victim pleased his relatives, villagers and the local authorities. Shortly after that happened, an investigation was initiated to identify the perpetrators and possible accomplices involved in this incident. The local gendarmerie also announced that they were taking several steps to strengthen security, which included intensifying intelligence gathering activities, increasing the number of patrols in the area, raising awareness about the importance of prompt reporting of suspicious events and activities, and strengthening of the TAFA community system, a group of fokonolona participating in efforts to combat dahalo.

On April 23, 2025, the Malagasy National Gendarmerie performed an investigative sweep in the district of Tsaratanana, a rural commune of Brieville, in response to a series of kidnapping incidents in the region. The gendarmes captured a forty-five-year-old individual, who was known for committing dahalo and mpimasy, was apprehended in Morafeno, fokontany Antsampandrano. While being interogated, the individual admitted they were involved in various kidnapping incidents and agreed to cooperate with the investigators. The individual provided information that indicated the location where some of his accomplices were hiding, which was in the vicinity of the village known as Amboasarikely, Malamamaina fokontany. The individual, accompanied by some gendarmerie elements, was to leading them to the individual's accomplices on foot, when the individual broke out of the handcuffs and tried to escape, going in a westward direction. After the individual was given several loud warnings from the gendarmes and refused to comply, the gendarmes fatally shot the individual. At the time the article was written the gendarmerie was still looking for the individual's accomplices.

On June 11, 2026, a National Gendarmerie company based in Tsiroanomandidy was alerted to the disappearance of a child. On June 14, 2026, the abductors contacted his parents to tell them that they were holding their child, and that in exchange for the child's release, the family had to pay a ransom of 45 million ariary to them. The family immediately referred the matter to the authorities. The gendarmes launched an investigation into it and set up a search and intervention system aimed at finding the child and capturing the perpetrators. On June 16, around 5 pm., an rescue operation was carried out at Vavaranon'ny Sakamalao, in Mahatsinjokely, fokontany of Ambohitsivalaka. It resulted in the arrest of two individuals and the rescue of the child, who was held in an open-air place without any shelter, who was reunited with their family. No ransom was paid to the abductors, and the operation had no casualties.

== Organization ==
=== Organizational structure ===
The Malagasy National Gendarmerie is divided into two bodies, which are the mobile gendarmerie and the Territorial Gendarmerie. The ZN is made up of various departments and units including:

- Delegated Minister in charge of the Gendarmerie (French: Ministère Délégué en charge de la Gendarmerie, MDG)
  - Cabinet
    - Directorate of Planning, Monitoring and Evaluation
      - Studies, Planning, and Statistics Department (French: Service des Etudes, de la planification et de la Statistique, SEPS)
      - Monitoring and Evaluation Service (French: Service du Suivi et de L’évaluation, SSE)
      - International Relations and Cooperation Service (French: Service des Relations lnternationales et de la Coopération, SRIC)
      - Information and Communication Service (French: Service de l’lnformation et de la Communication, SIC)
      - Institutional and External Relations Service (French: Service des Relations avec res lnstitutions et des Orgànisre, Externes, SRIOE)
      - Administrative and Financial Service (French: Service Administratif et Financier, SAF)
    - Directorate in charge of the Fight against Corruption and the Processing of Grievances (French: Direction chargée de la Lutte Contre la Corruption et de Traitement des Doléances, DLCCTD)
      - Prevention Service (French: Service de Prévention, SPREV)
      - Law Enforcement Service (French: Service de Répression, SREPR)
      - Grievance Processing Service (French: Service de Traitement des Doléances, STD)
      - Financial and Logistics Service (French: Service Financier et Logistique, SFL)
        - Commander of the National Gendarmerie (French: Commandant de la Gendarmerie Nationale, COM GN)
          - Cabinet
            - First Deputy to the Commander of the National Gendarmerie (French: Premier Adjoint au Commandant de la Gendarmerie nationale)
            - Second Deputy to the Commander of the National Gendarmerie (French: Deuxième Adjoint au Commandant de la Gendarmerie nationale)
            - Chief of Staff (French: Chef d’Etat-major)
              - DU
                - Logistics and Support Service (French: Service de l'intendance, SINT)
                - Pay Service (French: Service de Solde, SS)
                - General Office of the Gendarmerie Mutual Benefit Society (French: Bureau Généralde la Mutuelle de la Gendarmerie, BGMUT)
                - Administrative Personnel Service (French: Service du Personnel Administratif, SPA)
                - General Equipment Establishment (French: Etablissement des Matériels Généraux, EMG)
                - Administrative and Financial Service (French: Service Administratif et Financier, SAF)
              - Directorate of Security and Intelligence (French: Direction de la Sécurité et des Renseignements, DSR)
                - Operations Department (French: Service des Opérations, OPS)
                - Intelligence Service (French: Service des Renseignements, RENS)
                - Cattle Theft Prevention Service (French: Service de Lutte Contre les Vols de Bæufs, SLCVB
                - Counter-Narcotics Service (French: Service de la Lutte Contre les Stupéfiants, STUP)
                - Counter-Terrorism Service (French: Service de Ia Lutte Contre le terrorisme, SLCT)
                - Communication and Public Relations Department (French: Service de ra Communication et des Relations Publiques, SCRP)
                - Operational Logistics Service (French: Service de la Logistique Opérationnelle, SLO)
                - Administrative and Financial Service (French: Service Administratif et Financier, SAF)
              - Personnel Management Directorate (French: Direction de la Gestion du Personnel, DGP)
                - Personnel Service Officer (French: Service du Personnel Officier, SPO)
                - Personnel Service Non-Commissioned Officer (French: Service du Personnel Sous-Officier)
                - Social Actions Service (French: Service des Actions Sociales, SAS)
                - Litigation Department (French: Service Contentieux, SCONT)
                - Civil Personnel and Conscripts Service (French: Service du Personnel Civil et des Appelés, SPCA)
                - OGN
                - Administrative and Financial Service (French: Service Administratif et Financier, SAF)
              - Directorate of Organization and Employment (French: Direction de l’Organisation et de I’Emploi, DOE)
                - Employment Services (French: Service Emploi, SE)
                - Legal and Documentation Service (French: Service Juridique et de la Documentation, SJD)
                - Miscellaneous Police Services (French: Service des polices Diverses, SPD)
                - Organization and Statistics Department (French: Service de l’Organisation et des Statistiques, SOS)
                - Anti-corruption Service (French: Service Anti-corruption)
                - Administrative and Financial Service (French: Service Administratif et Financier, SAF)
              - Directorate of the Judicial Police (French: Direction de la Police Judiciaire)
                - Financial Crime Enforcement Service (French: Service de Lutte contre les Délinquances Financières, SLDEF)
                - Cybercrime Department (French: Service de la Lutte contre la Cybercriminalité, SLCC)
                - Child and Moral Protection Service (French: Service de la Protection des Enfants et des Mæurs, SPEM)
                - Criminal and Special Affairs Service (French: Service des Affaires Criminelles et Spéciales, SACS)
                - Coordination Service for Judicial Activities (French: Service de Coordination des Activités Judiciaires, SCAJ)
                - Files and Judicial Reconciliation Service (French: Service Fichiers et Rapprochement Judiciaire, SFRJ)
                - Administrative and Financial Service (French: Service Administratif et Financier, SAF)
              - Technical Directorate (French: Direction Technique, DT)
                - Administrative and Financial Service (French: Service Administratif et Financier, SAF)
                - Real Estate and Land Assets Department (French: Service des Patrimoines lmmobiliers et Fonciers, SPIF)
                - Infrastructure Department (French: Service des lnfrastructures, INFRA)
                - Transport Equipment Department (French: Service des Matériels de Transport, MATR)
                - Armament and Special Equipment Service (French: Service de I’Armement et des Equipements Spéciaux, ARMS)
              - Directorate of Information System and Telecommunications (French: Direction du Système d’lnformation et des Télécommunications, DSIT)
                - IT Systems Analysis and Development Department (French: Service des Etudes et Développement lnformatique, SEDI)
                - National: Operations, Maintenance, and Training Department (French: Nationale : Service Exploitation, Maintenance et Formation, SEMF)
                - Telecommunications Service (French: Service des Télécommunications, STEL)
                - Administrative and Financial Service (French: Service Administratif et Financier, SAF)
              - Directorate of Headquarters (French: Direction du Quartier Général, DQG)
                - Technical Service (French: Service Technique, ST)
                - Medical Service (French: Service Médical, SM)
                - General Affairs Service (French: Service des Affaires Générales, SAG)
                - Human Resources Services (French: Services des Ressources Humaines, SRH)
                - Sport Service (French: Service Sport, SPORT)
            - Command of the Schools and Training of the National Gendarmerie (French: Commandement des Ecoles et des formations de la Gendarmerie nationale, CEGN)
              - National Gendarmerie Higher School (French: Ecole Supérieure de la Gendarmerie nationale, ESGN)
              - Ambositra National Gendarmerie School (French: Ecole de la Gendarmerie Nationale Ambositra, EGNA)
            - Command of Specialized Training (French: Commandement des Formations Spécialisées, CFS)
              - General Affairs Service (French: Service des Affaires Générales, SAG)
            - National Gendarmerie Intervention Forces (French: Forces d’intervention de la Gendarmerie Nationale, FIGN)
              - General Affairs Service (French: Service des Affaires Générales, SAG)
            - Six National Gendarmerie Jurisdictions (French: Circonscription de la Gendarmerle Nationale, CIRGN)
        - General Secretariat (French: Secrétariat Général, SG)
          - Directorate General for Road Safety (French: Direction Générale de la Sécurité Routière, DGSR)
            - Administrative and Financial Department (French: Direction Administrative et Financière, DAF)
            - Technical Directorate (French: Direction Technique, DT)
            - DOR
          - General Affairs Service (French: Service des Affaires Générales, SAG)
          - Administrative and Financial Department (French: Direction Administrative et Financière, DAF)
            - Finance and Budget Department (French: Service des Finances et du Budget, SFB)
            - Public Investment Department (French: Service des lnvestissements publics, SIP)
            - Financial Evaluation Monitoring Service (French: Service de Suivi Evaluation Financière, SSEF)
            - Internships and Training Service (French: Service des Stages et Formations, SSF)
          - Directorate of Human Resources (French: Direction des Ressources Humaines, DRH)
            - Personnel Service (French: Service des personnels, SPERS)
            - SCA
            - Internships and Training Service (French: Service des Stages et Formations, SSF)
            - Internships and Training Service (French: Service des Stages et Formations, SSF)
          - Public Procurement Officer (French: Personne Responsable des Marchés publics, PRMP)
          - Directorate in charge of the Fight against Terrorism, Narcotics and Transnational Crime (French: Direction chargée de la Lutte Contre Ie Terrorisme,les Stupéfiants et Ia Criminalité Transnationale, DLCTS-CTO)
            - Strategy and Organization Service (French: Service Stratégie et 0rganisation, SSO)
            - Monitoring and Evaluation Service (French: Service du Suivi et de L’évaluation, SSE)
            - SCRO
            - Financial and Logistics Service (French: Service Financier et Logistique, SFL)

They have two tactical units, which are the Security and Special Intervention Group (French: Groupement de sécurité et d’intervention spéciale, GSIS) and National Gendarmerie Intervention Forces (French: Forces d’intervention de la Gendarmerie Nationale, FIGN). On February 21, 2020, the Malagasy National Gendarmerie established an Anti-Kidnapping Brigade (Malagasy: Brigade anti-kidnapping).

=== List of commanders of the Malagasy National Gendarmerie ===
Here is a list of the commanders of the National Gendarmerie:

Rank	Name	Time period they were in command
Lieutenant colonel	Richard Ratsimandrava	1969–1975
Lieutenant colonel	Jaona Mampila	1975
Lieutenant colonel	Mijoro Rakotomanga	1975–1977
Lieutenant colonel	Philippe Jean	1977–1984
Colonel	Désiré Rakotoarijaona	1984
Colonel	Randrianasoavina	1984–1991
Colonel	Jean Paul Bory	1991–1993
Général de brigade	Ernest Ravelomanana	1993–1997
Général de brigade	Charles Sylvain Rabotoarison	1997–2002
Général de division	Findraina Elson Sambiheviny	2002–2003
Général de division	Augustin Randrianasolo	2003–2006
Général de brigade	Claude Ramananarivo	2006–2008
Général de division	Lucien Emmanuel Raharijaona	2008–2009
Général de brigade	Pily Gilbain	2009
Colonel	Jean Bruno Wilfrid Razafindrakoto	2009–2012
Général de brigade	Richard Ravalomanana	2012–2014
Général de brigade	François Rodin Rakoto	2014–2016
Général de brigade	Jean de Dieu Daniel Ramiandrisoa	2016–2018
Général de division	Njatoarisoa Andrianjanaka	2018–2021
Général de division	Andriantsarafara Rakotondrazaka	2021–2024
Général de division	Andriatahina Jean Herbert Rakotomalala	2024

== Training ==
On March 9, 2023, Elements of the Malagasy National Gendarmerie's Special Security and Response Group (GSIS), along with maritime security guards, local security officers and other qualified security and health professionals, took part in emergency simulation and crisis response exercises at the U.S. Embassy ran by the Embassy's Regional Security Office (RSO). On August 27, 2025, the ZN, along with the Malagasy Armed Forces, participated in a parachute jump exercise at the Arivonimamo air base that was organized jointly with the French Armed Forces. The exercise consisted of a military parachuting qualification course and maintenance jump. During the fourth jump of the training exercise, some participants encountered strong wind gusts. As a result, three soldiers, including two from the Malagasy National Gendarmerie, were killed and five other paratroopers were injured The injured paratroopers were transported by helicopter to receive medical care at Soavinandriana hospital (CenhoSoa) in Antananarivo.

On January 27, 2024, the Malagasy National Gendarmerie, along with the Malagasy Armed Forces, took part in a Humanitarian Response Exercise at U.S. Embassy in Antananarivo. The members of the United States Armed Forces and Embassy medical teams taught best practices and current techniques and technology for battlefield medical care and trauma care to members of the Malagasy Army and Gendarmerie. Between November 4 and November 8 of 2024, twenty-seven civilian and military personnel from the Malagasy National Gendarmerie, Madagascar’s Maritime Administration, and immigration agencies participated in a national workshop for port workers with designated security duties was held in Toamasina, Madagascar. The workshop was part of the Port Security Project funded by the European Union and implemented jointly by International Maritime Organization (IMO), International Criminal Police Organization (INTERPOL) and the United Nations Office on Drugs and Crime (UNODC).

Between August 3, 2026 and August 8, 2026, the ZN took part in a workshop dealing with the identification, investigation and recovery of virtual assets held at the SAMIFIN Ilohay Center. It was organized by the Malagasy Financial Intelligence Unit (Malagasy: Sampan-draharaha Malagasy Iadiana amin'ny Famotsiam-bola, SAMIFIN; or French: Service de Renseignements Financiers, SRF), who also took part in the workshop, with financial support from the United Nations Office on Drugs and Crime (UNODC). Other agencies that took part in this workshop included INTERPOL, Illicit Assets Recovery Agency of Madagascar (IARA, French: Agence de Recouvrement des Avoirs Illicites, ARAI), Malagasy Independent Anti-Corruption Bureau (IACB, French: Bureau Indépendant Anti-Corruption, BIANCO), Malagasy National Police, Central Intelligence Service (CIS), and some other anti-corruption agencies.

== See also ==
- Antsirabe Military Academy
