= Seychelles Police Force =

Law enforcement organization

Seychelles Police Force Police des Seychelles (French) Lafors Lapolis Sesel (Seychellois Creole)
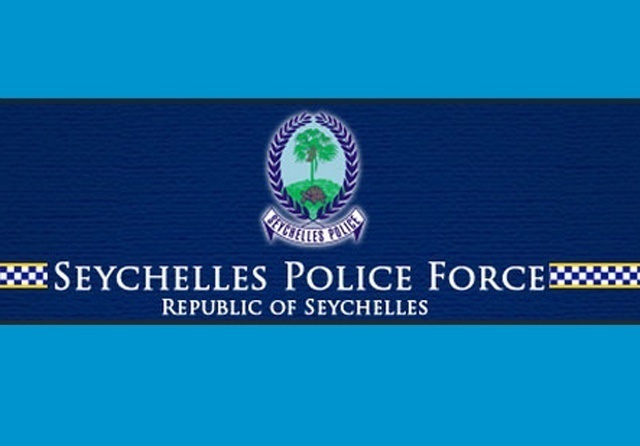
- SPF logo.

Jurisdictional structure
- National agency: Seychelles
- Operations jurisdiction: Seychelles
- General nature: Civilian police

The Seychelles Police Force (SPF) is the national police force of Seychelles. Their main functions are to maintain order, help maintain internal security in both Seychelles and areas under the Seychelles government's control, and detect and thwart criminal actions in both Seychelles and other areas under the Seychelles government's control. They are regulated by both the Seychelles' constitution and national legislation. They received donations from the United Kingdom and China to help them address digital crime and improve the training for future officers.

Drug trafficking, cybercrime, and corruption within the force are major problems that the Seychelles Police Force deals with frequently.

== History ==
The first police force was created in 1802 by French colonial officials before a professional police force was raised in 1862.

In 1968, the Seychelles Police Force established the Scientific Support & Criminal Records Bureau (SS&CRB), also known as the Fingerprint Bureau, after a group of Seychellois police officers went to the United Kingdom to be trained on crime scene investigation and fingermark detection. Pathology investigations were handled with assistance from the Ministry of Health, while specialized services such as DNA, toxicology and ballistic examinations in serious crime cases were outsourced to overseas laboratories. In 1972, the Seychelles Police Force established a dog unit, that was made up of five German Shepherds and their handlers. The dogs were housed at the Union Vale prison.

In 1992, the increasing discoveries of heroin being used in Seychelles led the Seychelles Police Force's Scientific Support & Criminal Records Bureau to create a controlled substance laboratory, which was staffed by retired experts from Mauritius and the United Kingdom due not having any locally qualified staff. In 2015, the SPF's Scientific Support & Criminal Records Bureau created the digital forensic laboratory. In early November of 2017, police commissioner Kishnan Labonte released plans to rework the organizational structure of the Seychelles Police Force. Labonte indicated that there were four areas in his plan that he intended to concentrate on to help improve the SPF, which were discipline. training, community policing, and effective use of resources.

On December 22, 2025, the Seychelles Police Force received a new canine unit facility that was donated by the United Arab Emirates located in Barbarons, Grand Anse Mahé.

== Branches ==
The SPF is divided into various squads and units and the most notable are:

- Family Squad
- Child Protection Unit
- Traffic Unit
- Marine Police Unit
- Canine unit
- Commercial Crimes Unit
- Cybercrime unit
- Quick Reaction Team (QRT)
- Counter Terrorism Unit
- Public Order and Tactical Response Unit

The Public Order and Tactical Response Unit is the Seychelles Police Force's police tactical unit. Some specialized teams that are part of that unit include:

- Armory unit
- VVIP protection unit
- Riot control unit
- NEDEX (Bomb disposal unit)
- Seychelles Vessel Protection Detachment

== Training and recruitment ==
on June 28, 2023, the Seychelles Police Force and the Rwanda National Police signed a memorandum of understanding (MOU) with a focus on enhancing their policing capabilities, which numerous individuals from the Seychelles Police Force have traveled to Rwanda to receive training. Between July 21, 2025 to 25, 2025, the Seychelles Police Force, along with Financial Crimes Investigations Unit, Anti-Corruption Commission Seychelles, Financial Intelligence Unit, Attorney General’s Office, Financial Services Authority, and Seychelles Revenue Commission, took part in a week-long workshop titled Investigating and Prosecuting Complex Financial Crimes that was organized by the U.S. embassy in Seychelles, in collaboration with the U.S. Federal Bureau of Investigation. Some officials from the Federal Bureau of Investigation (FBI) and one formerly from the Department of Justice (DOJ) trained the participating investigators, analysts, and prosecutors on international best practices to utilize during complex financial crime investigations and prosecutions. On February 16, 2026, senior police officials began a two-day training program to strengthen the force’s response to hate crime, concentrating on legislation, investigative techniques, charging decisions, and victim support; under the guidance Wendy Boucrot of the Human Dignity Trust and Professor Mark Walters, a UK-based expert in criminal law and criminology.

In March of 2026, the Seychelles Police Force's Quick Reaction Team participated in a two-week intensive training program done in collaboration with the French National Gendarmerie's National Gendarmerie Intervention Group (GIGN) detachment from Réunion Island. This collaboration between the French Gendarmerie and the Seychelles Police has been held for five consecutive years as of March of 2026. In May of 2026, two police constables from the Seychelles Police Force's Marine Police Unit successfully completed a ‘Training of Trainers’ program delivered by the United Nations Office on Drugs and Crime, earning certification as qualified instructors. In July of 2026, five officers from the SPF's Marine Police Unit along with partner agencies, including the Regional Coordination Operations Centre (RCOC) and the Seychelles Coast Guard, completed a joint training program focused on strengthening their skills in maritime surveillance, monitoring, and the effective use of the IORIS platform.

== Equipment ==
On November 13, 2025, the Seychelles Police Force received forty body cameras with docking stations from the Seychelles Petroleum Company.

== Other Police Agencies from Countries located nearby ==
- Somaliland Police
- Ethiopian Federal Police
- Somali Police Force
- Kenya Police
- Tanzania Police Force
- Malagasy National Police
- Mauritius Police Force
