= Military ranks of Madagascar =

The Military ranks of Madagascar are the military insignia used by the Military of Madagascar. Being a former colony of France, Madagascar shares a rank structure alike to that of France.

== Commissioned officer ranks ==
The rank insignia of commissioned officers.

Rank group	General / flag officers				Senior officers			Junior officers
Madagascar Ground Forces
Madagascar Ground Forces	Général d'armée	Général de corps d'armée	Général de division	Général de brigade	Colonel	Lieutenant-colonel	Commandant	Capitaine	Lieutenant	Sous-lieutenant
Madagascar Navy
Madagascar Navy	Amiral	Vice-amiral d'escadre	Vice-amiral	Contre-amiral	Capitaine de vaisseau	Capitaine de frégate	Capitaine de corvette	Lieutenant de vaisseau	Enseigne de vaisseau de 1^{re} classe	Enseigne de vaisseau de 2^{e} classe
Madagascar Air Force
Madagascar Air Force	Général d'armée	Général de corps d'armée	Général de division	Général de brigade	Colonel	Lieutenant-colonel	Commandant	Capitaine	Lieutenant	Sous-lieutenant
Rank group	General / flag officers				Senior officers			Junior officers

== Other ranks ==
The rank insignia of non-commissioned officers and enlisted personnel.

Rank group	Senior NCOs						Junior NCOs		Enlisted
Madagascar Ground Forces									No insignia
Madagascar Ground Forces	Adjudant-major	Adjudant-chef	Adjudant	Sergent-major	Sergent-chef	Sergent	Caporal-chef	Caporal	Soldat
Madagascar Navy									No insignia
Madagascar Navy	Maître principal	Premier maître	Maître	Second-maître de hors classe	Second-maître de 1^{ère} classe	Second-maître de 2^{ème} classe	Quartier-maître de 1^{ère} classe	Quartier-maître de 2^{ème} classe	Matelot
Madagascar Air Force									No insignia
Madagascar Air Force	Adjudant-major	Adjudant-chef	Adjudant	Sergent-major	Sergent-chef	Sergent	Caporal-chef	Caporal	Soldat
Rank group	Senior NCOs						Junior NCOs		Enlisted
