= Malagasy National Police =

Madagascar's National Police

The Malagasy National Police (Police Nationale Malagasy, MNP) is one of the national law enforcement agencies in Madagascar. Its activities are overseen by the Ministry of Public Security (Minisiteran’ny Filaminam-bahoaka, DRFC). The Malagasy National Police is responsible for performing law enforcement tasks in urban areas, while the Malagasy National Gendarmerie and Malagasy Armed Forces, which is overseen by the Ministry of National Defense, are responsible for executing law enforcement tasks in rural areas, protecting government facilities, and running a maritime police contingent.

== History ==
During the feudal era, the ZOKIOLONA and SAKAIZAM-BOHITRA were responsible for security and police tasks. In September 1896, following the end of the Franco-Hova Wars, the French government sent General Joseph Simon Gallieni to deal with the threat of a rebellion in Madagascar. After ending the Merina monarchy and taking command of the military government of Madagascar, Gallieni established the General Security in 1897 by decree. The General Security was responsible for tax collection.

After Madagascar gained independence on June 26, 1960, Malagasy Republic created the Directorate of the National Police in the Ministry of the Interior on September 31, 1961. It was composed of small intervention groups, known as General Police Brigades. Over time, more of the agency's personnel became increasingly made up of people of Malagasy descent. In 1965, these units were converted into the Republican Security Force (Force Républicaine de Sécurité, FRS), which was involved in the conflict against the National Movement for the Independence of Madagascar (Mouvement Nationaliste et Indépendant de Madagascar, MONIMA) led by Monja Jaona in the southern Madagascar in 1971.

After the Malagasy Republic (first republic) fell and President Philibert Tsiranana transferred power to the Malagasy National Army led by General Gabriel Ramanantsoa, the Republican Security Force was called Mobile Police Group (Groupe Mobile de la Police, GMP) until President Colonel Richard Ratsimandrava's assassination in February 1975. During the period that Madagascar was ruled under the government of the Democratic Republic of Madagascar (second republic), President Didier Ratsiraka signed Decree 76-088 of 7 March 1976 that renamed the Directorate of the National Police into the General Directorate of the National Police and charged the Ministry of the Interior with overseeing it. Ratsiraka signed Decree No. 77-446 of 21 December 1977 the following year, which established Police Intervention Forces (Forces d’Intervention de Police, FIP) that were based in Antanimora district in Antananarivo. Initially, a lot of the recruits for the FIP were former soldiers.

During the time Madagascar was ruled by the interim government in 1992, the General Directorate of the National Police was renamed the Ministry of the National Police. President Albert Zafy signed Decree 0836.94 of 1 March 1994, which delimited the territorial jurisdiction of the services of the Malagasy National Police. During the Republic of Madagascar (third republic), President Didier Ratsiraka changed the Ministry of National Police to the Secretariat of State in charge of Public Security, which is overseen by the Ministry of the Interior.

On September 30, 2023, a blood drive, ran in collaboration with the Ministry of Public Health and a blood transfusion center located in Joseph Ravoahangy-Andrianavalona hospital, was held at Ministry of National Police in Anosy to celebrate the 62nd anniversary of the inception of the Malagasy National Police. The Malagasy National Police assisted in providing security during Southern African Development Community (SADC) conference that was held in Antananarivo, which started on August 12, 2025. On January 21, 2026, the Malagasy National Police and the Malagasy National Gendarmerie signed a security agreement with the Central Bank of Madagascar (French: Banque centrale de Madagascar, BCM), which stated that the Malagasy National Police's Special Intervention Unit would be responsible for escorting funds from the bank transported to their destinations on the road instead of the Malagasy National Gendarmerie who was previously responsible for performing that task.

== Organization ==
=== Organizational structure ===
The MNP is divided into various squads and units including:

- Central Recruitment Service (Malagasy: SERVICE CENTRAL DU RECRUTEMENT)
- Women's Proximity Brigade (Malagasy: Brigade Féminine de Proximité, BFP)
- Traffic Police (Malagasy: Polisy misahana ny fifamoivoizana)
- Special Investigation and Anti-Fraud Unit (Malagasy: sampan-draharahara misahana ny fanadihadiana manokana sy miady amin’ny hosoka)
- Crime Prevention Agency
- Anti-Crime Unit (Malagasy: Sampana miady amin'ny heloka bevava)
- Police Intervention Force (French: la Force d’intervention de la police, FIP).
- Judicial Police
  - Morality Police and the Protection of Minors (French: la Police des Mœurs et de la Protection des Mineurs, PMPM)
    - Cybercrime Division
- Police Service for the Protection of Children and Vulnerable Persons and Combating Pornography (Malagasy: sampandraharahan’ny Polisy miaro ny ankizy sy ireo olona marefo ary miady amin’ny heloka mamoafady)
- National Police Emergency Response Force (NPERF, Malagasy: Hery Vonjy Taitran’ny Polisimpirenena)
- Specialized Units of the National Police (French: Unités spécialisées de la Police Nationale, USPN)
  - Special Intervention Unit (French: Unité spéciale d’intervention, USI)
  - Rapid Intervention Unit (Malagasy: Unité d’intervention Rapide, UIR)
  - Anti-Gang Service (French: Service Anti-Gang, SAG)
- Directorate of Immigration Control (Malagasy: Fitaleavana misahana ny fanaraha-maso ny fifindra-monina)
  - Passport Issuance Service (Malagasy: Sampandraharahan’ny Polisimpirenena misahana ny famoahana Pasipaoro)
- Border Security Police (Malagasy: Polisy misahana ny fiarovana ny sisin-tany, PAF)
- Criminal Investigation and Prosecution Police (Malagasy: Polisy misahana ny fanadihadiana sy fanenjehana fandikan-dalàna, OPJ)

=== Executive Structure ===
The organization of MNP consists of the following:

- Inspector General of Police (Minister of Public Security)
- Comptroller General of Police (Secretary-general of the Ministry of Public Security)
- Comptroller General of Police (Director General of the National Police)
  - Comptroller General of Police (Coordinator and Head of the General Inspectorate of the National Police)
- Deputy Director General
- Divisional Commissioner of Police (Chief of Staff)
  - Chief Commissioner of Police (Officer in charge of Public Procurement)
- Chief Commissioner of Police (Director of Anti-Corruption and Discipline)
- Divisional Commissioner of Police (Director of Internal Investigations)
- Comptroller General of Police (Director of Human Resources)
- Divisional Commissioner of Police (Director of the National Police Academy)
- Comptroller General of Police (Director of Financial Affairs and Logistics)
- Divisional Commissioner of Police (Director of the National School of Inspectors and Police Officers)
- Chief Commissioner of Police (Director of Programming, Monitoring and Evaluation)
- Chief Commissioner of Police (Director of Economic Police)
- Divisional Commissioner of Police (Director of Intelligence Services)
  - Comptroller General of Police (Director of Migration Control)
- Comptroller General of Police (Director of Research and Continuing Education)
- Comptroller General of Police (Director of the Judicial Police)
- Chief Commissioner of Police (Director of the Police Intervention Forces)
- Commissioner of Police (Director of Information Systems and Transmissions)

As part of a broader security cooperation between France and Madagascar that is performed under the authority of the internal security attaché in the French Embassy, a French police officer is assigned to be an advisor to the Director General of the National Police. This advisor provides technical cooperation with Malagasy National Police, which includes:

- providing daily support and advice to the MNP
- participating numerous management committees
- selecting Malagasy police officers to go to France or the ENVR for technical training
- organizing expert missions ran by specialists from French specialized units, including Search, Assistance, Intervention, Deterrence unit (French: Recherche, Assistance, Intervention, Dissuasion, RAID), Republican Security Corps (French: Compagnies Républicaines de Sécurité, CRS), and Central Directorate of the Judicial Police (French: Direction centrale de la police judiciaire; DCPJ)
- assisting in providing training with the Internal Security Service on a broad array of topics
- assisting in transferring equipment to MNP
- structuring projects according the MNP's goals and long-term plans
- writing proposals in response to the needs and solicitations of the Malagasy National Police
- assisting in implementing the RETEX function

These actions are operationally considered part of the activities of the French Internal Security Service.

== Recruitment ==
Title II of Law No. 96-026 of 2 October 1996 discusses the rules used for recruiting new police officers to join the Malagasy National Police. Officials are recruited using direct competition and or professional competition. Individuals looking to join the Malagasy National Police must attend a Police Training School, which, if they pass their exit exams, they will receive a professional diploma. Officials in the National Police, the Corps of Inspectors General and Controllers General, and the Corps of Police Commissioners are appointed by decrees rendered by the Council of the government, while officials in the Corps of Officers, Inspectors and Brigadiers and Police Officers are designated by orders issued by the Prime Minister, who can delegate the Minister who oversees of the National Police to do this task for them. In order to be appointed to a post in the Malagasy National Police, an individual must:

- be of Malagasy nationality
- possess and value civil rights and good morals
- not serving a criminal sentence that involves imprisonment, regardless of whether or not they were suspended
- be in a regular in person position with the National Service
- meet the physical and medical conditions that are required to do the job effectively
- be able to work both during the day and at night
- be between eighteen and forty years of age on January 1 of their recruitment

== Training ==
On June 10, 2025, the US Embassy in Madagascar announced the initiation of a two-day English language training program for instructors from the Malagasy National Police, including National Police School (Ecole Nationale Supérieure de la Police, ENSP) based in Ivato, and the Malagasy National Gendarmerie, including the Higher School of the National Gendarmerie (Ecole Supérieure de la Gendarmerie Nationale, ESGN) based in Moramanga. The training was held in Antananarivo; with goal of improving communication and expanding and deepening international engagement of Madagascar's law enforcement agencies. Between September 1 and September 5 of 2025, the Malagasy National Police attended a training course held at the International Law Enforcement Academy (ILEA) in Otse, Botswana ran by the United States Federal Bureau of Investigation (FBI), with support from the U.S. Department of State’s Bureau of International Narcotics and Law Enforcement Affairs (INL), that educated police officers on detecting, investigating, and prosecuting cybercrimes and online child exploitation. On September 8, 2025, twenty police officers from the MNP stationed at Ivato Airport participated in a four-day training at the RAZAFINDRAZAKA Bertin Station on how to perform investigations into cases of sexual abuse of children and human rights abuses that was carried out by two officials from the United States Federal Bureau of Investigation, with support from United Nations Office on Drugs and Crime (UNODC). On September 18, 2025, thirty police officers took part in a two-day training on combating pornography and sexual violence against children ran by the Malagasy Ministry of Public Security, in collaboration with the US FBI and UNODC.

Between August 3, 2026 and August 8, 2026, the Malagasy National Police took part in a workshop dealing with the identification, investigation and recovery of virtual assets held at the SAMIFIN Ilohay Center. It was organized by the Malagasy Financial Intelligence Unit (Malagasy: Sampan-draharaha Malagasy Iadiana amin'ny Famotsiam-bola, SAMIFIN; or French: Service de Renseignements Financiers, SRF), who also took part in the workshop, with financial support from the United Nations Office on Drugs and Crime. Other agencies that took part in this workshop included INTERPOL, Illicit Assets Recovery Agency of Madagascar (IARA, French: Agence de Recouvrement des Avoirs Illicites, ARAI), Malagasy Independent Anti-Corruption Bureau (IACB, French: Bureau Indépendant Anti-Corruption, BIANCO), Malagasy National Gendarmerie, Central Intelligence Service (CIS), and some other anti-corruption agencies.

== Equipment ==
=== Vehicles ===
In 2022, the Malagasy National Police received a donation of twenty-seven motorcycles with torches and one hundred and ninety-seven kits from the South Korean government. On May 3, 2024, the Inviso Group donated an armored car to the intervention units.

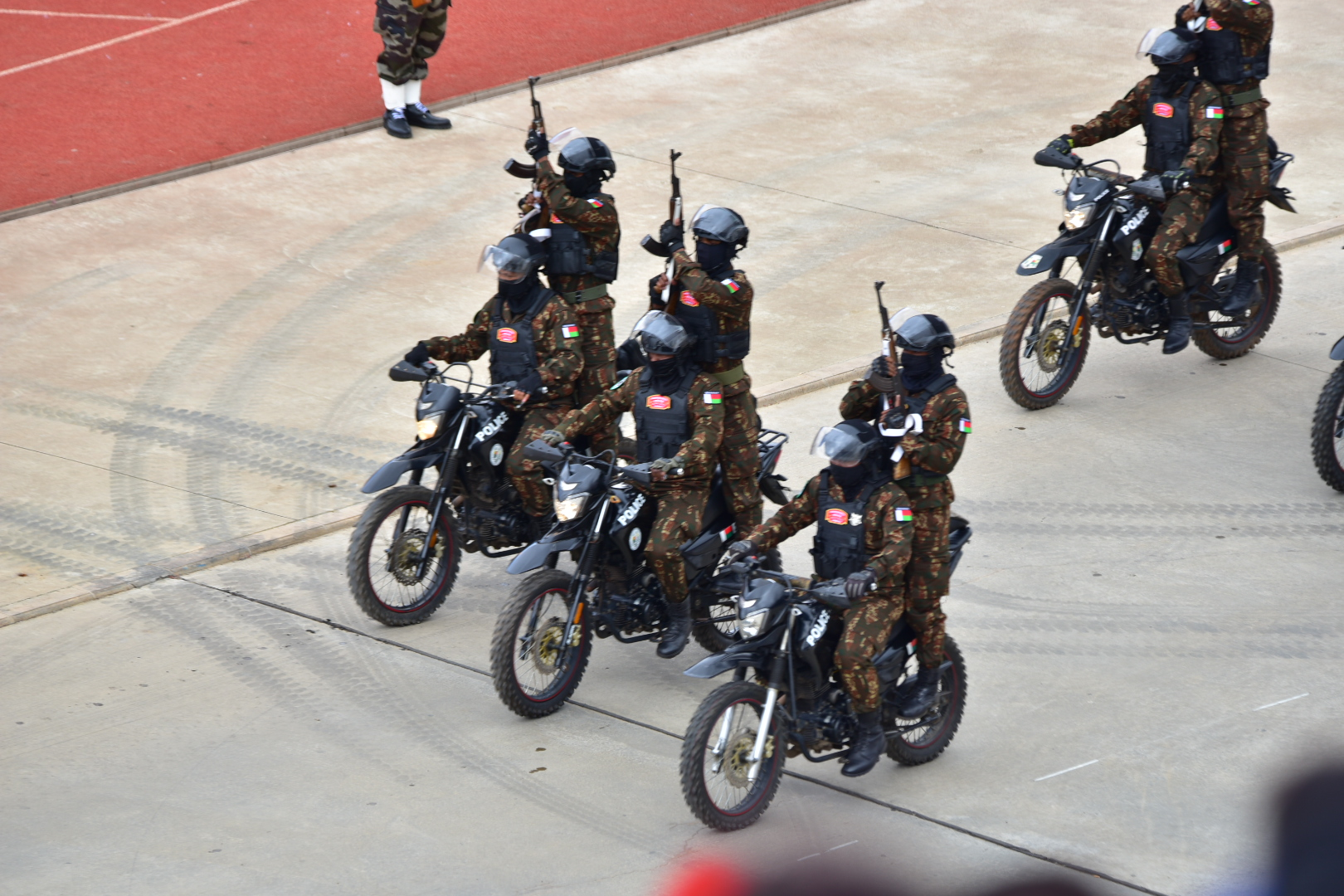

=== Personal Equipment ===
In 2022, the Malagasy National Police received Batons and Tonfas from the South Korean government. On February 8, 2023, the Malagasy Ministry of National Defense signed an agreement with the Malagasy Ministry of Public Security to donate firearms and ammunition cartridges to them to help combat insecurity in the country. On December 18, 2023, the Madagascar's security forces received a donation of tasers, helmets, vests, and oxygen concentrators from the Chinese government, which were divided between the Malagasy Armed Forces, Malagasy Gendarmerie, and Malagasy National Police. On May 3, 2024, two companies, Vigie and Inviso Group, donated supplies to the MNP. Vigie donated coats to support the traffic police.

On July 15, 2025, the French Embassy in Madagascar's Directorate of Security and Defense Cooperation (DCSD) donated four dark vision binoculars to the MNP. On September 25, 2025, the United States government finished updating the Personal Identification Secure Comparison and Evaluation System (PISCES) and providing training to police officers from the Malagasy National Police's Border Security Police on how to use it.

== Controversies ==
On December 10, 2014, a riot occurred in Morondava when five hundred people assembled at a police station to demand the release of the two leaders of a group of protesters. In response to some of the workers being armed, the police deployed tear gas and fired live rounds at the protesters, killing two people. The rioters then gathered at a sugar factory ran by a Chinese company to loot its sugar supply and set the building on fire. Seasonal workers at a sugar factory in Morondava began protesting in early November after the Chinese Embassy in Madagascar refused to accept contracts demanding better pay and working conditions. The protesters blocked the factory, disabled its utilities, harassed the facility's employees, and sabotaged some their equipment, which the Malagasy National Police responded by arresting two of the labor strike leaders.

The MNP stated that they were acting in self-defense as some workers had guns and machetes. The China News Service said the protesters were equipped with axes, slingshots, and rocks. In the aftermath, the Chinese staff that worked at the factory were evacuated due to safety concerns. The Chinese Embassy in Madagascar criticized the Malagasy government for failing to protect that facility and Chinese interests. Malagasy Prime Minister Roger Kolo and the Malagasy minister of industry, Jules Etienne Rolland, have vowed to attempt to resolve this dispute.

On April 21, 2018, one person was killed and sixteen people were injured when the Malagasy National Police dispersed a protest in Antananarivo about new electoral laws that prevent former Malagasy President Marc Ravalomanana from running for president. Some witinesses at Joseph Ravoahangy Andrianavalona hospital said that some of the injuries on the deceased individual appeared to have been caused by gas canisters. Amnesty International called for an investigation into this incident. Prime Minister Olivier Mahafaly said that an investigation would be performed and action would be taken against those who were responsible for those acts.

On June 3, 2020, protests were held in Toamasina to protest measures that were put in place to limit the spread of COVID-19. A police officer attacked a street vendor for violating a ban on commercial activities in the afternoon. The police denied committing the incident stating that they did not commit any acts of violence and that the individual had returned home after visiting a hospital for a short duration. After this occurred, the protesters burned tires, blocked roads, and pelted rocks at the police. In response, the police fired rubber bullets at them.

The MNP was accused of using excessive force by the opposition political parties in Madagascar when officers fired tear gas at protesters in Antananarivo on October 7, 2023. The protest was held to address what some of the candidates running against Malagasy President Andry Rajoelina are saying is an institutional coup to keep Rajolina in power. It was reported that former Malagasy President Marc Ravalomanana was injured, despite being escorted away by his bodyguards. The Malagasy National Police also deployed tear gas to disperse another protest that was held on October 2, 2023, in Antananarivo.

The opposition candidates led daily protests for nearly month. On November 5, 2023, the MNP fired tear gas to disperse protesters in Antananarivo. On November 6, 2023, another protest was held in an attempt to try to reach the central square of Antananarivo. However, police were posted around the city square. They briefly arrested Jean Jacques Ratsietison, an economist and candidate in the 2023 Malagasy presidential election, who was released the evening of the same day. Ratsietison received multiple criminal charges against him including committing acts of violence and attempting a coup d'état, which he said was disproportionate. This action was criticized by some of the opposition candidates.

== See also ==
- COSPN
- Tanzania Police Force
- South African Police Service
- Seychelles Police Force
- Mauritius Police Force
- Maldives Police Service
- Sri Lanka Police

== Cited Sources ==
- Europa Publications (2003). Political Chronology of Africa. Routledge. ISBN 978-1-135-35666-8.
- Pryor, Frederic L. (1990). The political economy of poverty, equity, and growth: Malawi and Madagascar. Washington, D.C.: World Bank. ISBN 978-0-19-520823-8. Archived from the original on 10 January 2020.
