= BIANCO =

Anti-corruption in Madagascar

The Independent Anti-Corruption Bureau (IACB, French: Bureau Indépendant Anti-Corruption, BIANCO) is the independent anti-corruption agency in Madagascar. It was founded in 2004 to implement a national anti-corruption strategy through the application of law and preventive measures against corruption, as well as education of the public.

== History ==
On September 1, 2004, the Independent Anti-Corruption Bureau was founded by Law No. 2004-030 of September 9, 2004. In 2006, IACB's territorial branches in Fianarantsoa and Toamasina were established. In 2008, BIANCO's territorial branches in Antananarivo, Toliara, Antsiranana, and Mahajanga. In 2015, the National Anti-Corruption Strategy for 2015 through 2025 was officially presented. In 2016, Law No. 2016-020 on the Fight against Corruption and Law No. 2016-021 on Anti-Corruption Units were adopted by the Malagasy government.

In 2019, the IACB's new headquarters called Tokyo was inaugurated. That same year, the IACB's first interregional branch was established in Morondava. An anonymous grievance tool called i-toroka was launched. In 2020, BIANCO was restructured. The same year, BIANCO's interregional branch in Sava was established.

In 2021, BIANCO participated in the thirty second special session of the United Nations General Assembly on corruption in New York City, New York, United States. In 2022, IACB's territorial branch in Manakara was established. In 2022, BIANCO's territorial branch in Taolagnaro was established. In August 27, 2024, BIANCO's special branch in Ivato International Airport was established. Also in 2024, Decision No. 2024-015/BIANCO/DG of August 26, 2024 on the organization, function, and mission of BIANCO's regional branches was adopted by the Malagasy government. In 2025, IACB's territorial branch in Anôsy was established.

On January 16, 2025, IACB launched a digital management platform for external financing, as part of the Project for the Strengthening Governance through Digitalization (Projet de renforcement de la gouvernance par la digitalisation, PREGODI), that allowed users to declare assets and monitor illicit financial flows. On March 13, 2025, BIANCO and the Illicit Assets Recovery Agency of Madagascar (ARAI) signed a Memorandum of Understanding to help facilitate collaboration in efforts to enforce anti-corruption laws and exchange of information related to each agencies' areas of responsibility. Between July 7, 2026 and July 8, 2026, a workshop organized by BIANCO and the president of the university with the support of the International Organization of La Francophonie (Organisation internationale de la Francophonie, OIF), was held at the University of Toamasina to develop an anti-corruption training module for Master II students. It was held as part of African Anti-Corruption Day (AYFC). In September of 2026, a kiosk was installed at Antananarivo International Airport to provide information, raise awareness of corruption and allow people to report acts of corruption at the airport.

== Organizational structure ==
The Independent Anti-Corruption Bureau is divided into various departments including:

- Director General (DG)
  - Senior Accountant (CP)
  - Technical Assistant (AT)
  - Cabinet (CAB)
    - Technical Advisor (CT)
    - Advisor in Internal and International Relations (CRII)
    - Communication Advisor (CCOM)
    - Legal Affairs Advisor (CAJ)
    - Inspector in Charge of Ethics Oversight and Safeguarding (ICOSE)
    - Inspector in charge of Management Control and Audit (ICGA)
    - Cabinet Attaché (ACAB)
  - Deputy Director General (DGA)
    - Director of Operations Support (DAO)
      - General Administration Service (SAG)
      - Finance and Budget Department (SFB)
      - Information Technology Department (SINFOR)
      - Human Resources Department (SRH)
    - Director of Investigation (DINVEST)
      - Investigation Department (SINVEST)
        - Special broadcast Unit
      - Operational Intelligence Service (SRO)
      - Asset Declarations Service (SDP)
    - Director of Education and Prevention (DEP)
      - Department of Education and Communication
      - Corruption Prevention Department

The IACB's territorial offices are structured as follows:

- Territorial Director (DT)
  - Broadcast Department
    - Regional Division
    - Interregional Division
  - Services Department
    - Territorial Operations Support Service (STAO)
    - Territorial Investigation Service (STI)
    - Territorial Service for Education and Prevention (STEP)
  - Territorial Accounting Assistant (ACT)
  - Territorial Legal Assistant (AJT)
  - Advisory Council on Investigation/Education-Prevention (CCI/EP)

== List of Director Generals of the Independent Anti-Corruption Bureau ==
Here is a list of the director generals of BIANCO:

Name	Time period they were in charge
René Ramarozatovo	October 28, 2004-2009
Faly Rabetrano	June 2009-2014
Jean Louis Andriamifidy	2014-2019
Andrianirina Laza Eric Donat	2019-2024
Gaby Nestor Razakamanantsoa	August 7, 2024-present

== Functions ==
The IACB's functions include:

- Preventing corruption by identifying risks in procedures and systems in the public and private sectors
- Recommending law and procedural reforms and providing advice for improving existing policies and procedures
- Educating the public about corruption and why it is important to fight it, mobilizing public support to help combat corruption
- Performing investigations into corruption and related offenses in order to effectively enforce the anti-corruption law
- Overseeing the dynamic management of declarations of assets and economic interests
- Promoting cooperation with national agencies, foreign government agencies, and international bodies to help combat corruption

== Training ==
Between August 3, 2026 and August 8, 2026, the Independent Anti-Corruption Bureau took part in a workshop dealing with the identification, investigation and recovery of virtual assets held at the SAMIFIN Ilohay Center. It was organized by the Malagasy Financial Intelligence Unit (Malagasy: Sampan-draharaha Malagasy Iadiana amin'ny Famotsiam-bola, SAMIFIN; or French: Service de Renseignements Financiers, SRF), who also took part in the workshop, with financial support from the United Nations Office on Drugs and Crime. Other agencies that took part in this workshop included INTERPOL, Illicit Assets Recovery Agency of Madagascar (IARA, French: Agence de Recouvrement des Avoirs Illicites, ARAI), Malagasy National Police, Malagasy National Gendarmerie, Central Intelligence Service (CIS), and some other anti-corruption agencies.

== See also ==
- Corruption in Madagascar
- Directorate on Corruption and Economic Crime
- Anti-Corruption Bureau
- Financial Crimes Commission
- Anti-Corruption Commission Seychelles
- Ethics and Anti-Corruption Commission
- United States Department of Justice's Criminal Division's Public Integrity Section
- National Anti-Corruption Commission
- Corruption Eradication Commission
