= Malagasy Air Force =

- Tafika Anabakabaka Malagasy; Armée de l'air malgache
- Active: 1960–present
- Country: Madagascar
- Type: Air force
- Size: 5 aircraft
- Part of: Madagascar Armed Forces
- Garrison/HQ: Antananarivo

Aircraft flown
- Transport: Let L-410 Turbolet Aérospatiale Alouette II Eurocopter AS350 Eurocopter EC130

The Malagasy Air Force (French: Armée de l'air malgache) is the air force branch of the Madagascar Armed Forces.

== History ==
The Malagasy Air Force was founded in 1960 with mainly former French aircraft such as Douglas DC-3s, Max Holste MH.1521 Broussards and Dassault MD 312s. As of 1970, the air force had 400 personnel on strength, and operated 10 transport aircraft, 11 liaison aircraft, three trainer aircraft and 10 helicopters. The Malagasy Air Force received four MiG-17F fighters from North Korea in 1979.

The first Mil Mi-8s were delivered in 1976, and two Antonov An-26s followed in 1980. Several Alouette IIIs were also received in the early 1980s. At an unknown time in the 1980s, the Malagasy Air Force received 10 MiG-21bis fighters and two MiG-21UM trainers. MiG-21s are confirmed to have been operational between 1990 and 2001. They rarely flew, and all of them were eventually put into storage.

In 2009 the Malagasy Air Force acquired four ex-Belgian Alouette IIs. For over a decade the only aircraft operational were Alouette IIs, CASA C-212s and some old light aircraft, as the last An-26 had been retired around 2009. In 2019 the Malagasy Air Force acquired a CASA/IPTN CN-235 to help replace some of its ageing equipment that was resold in 2021.

== Destruction of 14 planes in early 2009 ==
14 airplanes where destroyed in Farafangana during the 2009 Rajoelina coup, including the last operable MiGs.

== Organisation ==
The Malagasy Air Force operates out of its bases at Arivonimamo, near the capital Antananarivo. There are also airports available in Antalaha, Antsohihy, Diego Suarez, Fianarantsoa, Fort Dauphin, Mahajunga, Nosy-Be, Toamasina and Toliara.

== Fleet ==
=== Current fleet ===
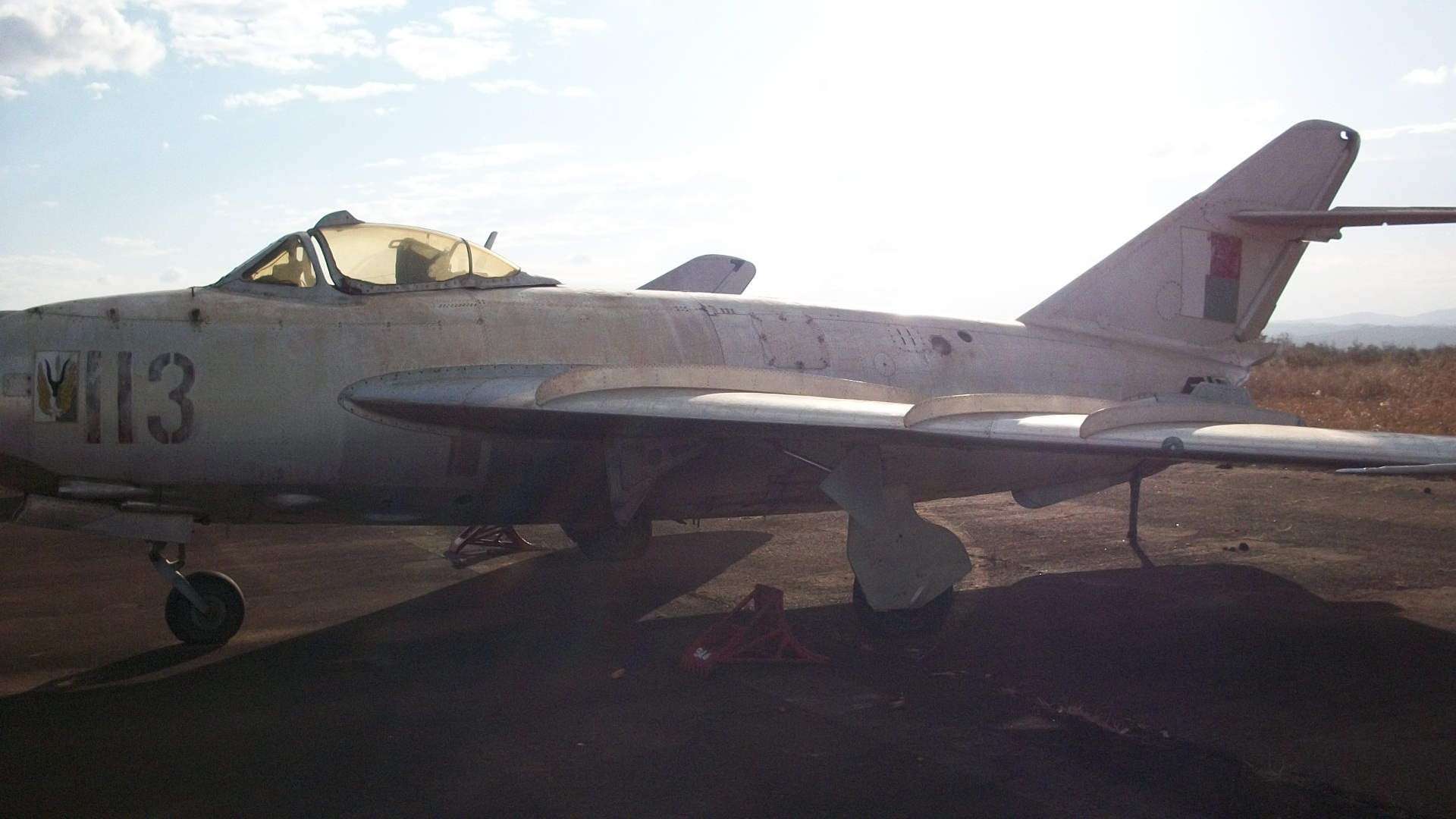
A former MiG-17 parked at Ivato Airport

Aircraft	Origin	Type	Variant	In service	Notes
Helicopters
Aérospatiale Alouette II	France	Utility		2	
Eurocopter AS350	France	Utility		2	
Eurocopter EC130	France	Utility		1	
