= Law enforcement in Tanzania =

Law enforcement in Tanzania is primarily the responsibility of the Tanzania Police Force within 947,303 km^{2} (365,756 sq. mi) of national jurisdiction of Tanzania. The force, headed by the Ministry of Home Affairs, is divided into five departments. Each department is led by a commissioner.

== Administrative Divisions ==
- Administration/Resource Management
- Operations
- Criminal Investigations
- Dar es Salaam Special Police Zone

Dar es Salaam is where Tanzania set up its first Crisis Response Team (CRT), with the assistance of U.S. Embassy in Dar es Salaam. It was made in response to needing to protect Tanzania's borders, escalating terrorist threats in East Africa, and a deficit in tactical capability to address those issues. CRT program selection testing process that included a strenuous endurance course, a rifle/pistol marksmanship test, and a written test designed to identify candidates based solely on merit. The first wave of chosen recruits were sent to the United States to receive training on variety of topics which include responding to an active shooters, border patrol interdiction, and mitigating explosives. A lot of the gear they got was donated to them by the US Diplomatic Security Office of Antiterrorism Assistance (ATA). This included breaching entry tools, medical kits, flashlights, vests with trauma plates, helmets, ballistic shields, targets, handcuffs, realistic training weapons, explosive IED training replicas, binoculars, and gas masks.

- Zanzibar Police Force

== Oversight ==
Oversight of the force is shared by the Principal Secretary of the Ministry of Home Affairs and the Inspector-General of Police. Both the Principal Secretary and the Inspector-General conduct internal affairs by way of tribunals and other measures deemed appropriate.

== Effectiveness ==
As of 2024, Tanzania ranks 65th out of 163 countries on the Global Peace Index. In 2023, the country advanced 11 positions in the index, surpassing Thailand, Nepal, France, and China. According to World Bank data, crime rates in Tanzania have shown a consistent decline, decreasing by 3.51% between 2018 and 2019, and by 18.42% between 2019 and 2020.
