= Charles Sylvain Rabotoarison =

Malagasy politician (1944–2020)

Charles Sylvain Rabotoarison (born 6 April 1944 in Vohipeno, died 2 July 2020) was a Malagasy politician. He was a member of the Senate of Madagascar for Vatovavy Fitovinany. He was former Minister of the Interior and Ministry of Environment, Water and Forestry.
