= Tanzania Police Force =

Tanzania Police Force Jeshi la Polisi Tanzania
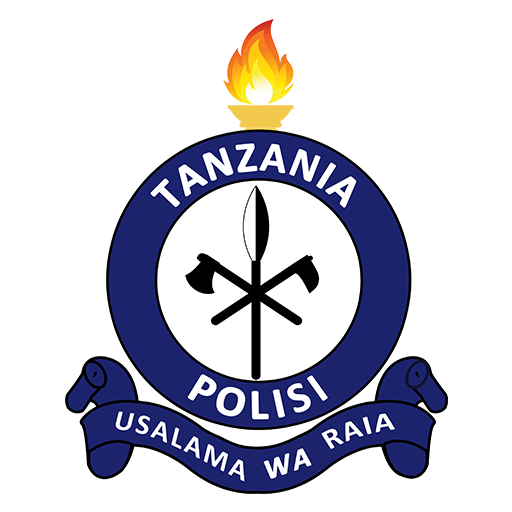
- Tanzania Police Force
- Abbreviation: TPF

Jurisdictional structure
- National agency: Tanzania
- Operations jurisdiction: Tanzania
- Governing body: Ministry of Home Affairs

Operational structure
- Headquarters: Dar es Salaam
- Elected officer responsible: Minister of Home Affairs
- Agency executive: Inspector General of Police (IGP)
- Parent agency: Ministry of Home Affairs

The Tanzania Police Force (TPF) is the national law enforcement agency of the United Republic of Tanzania. It is responsible for maintaining law and order, protecting life and property, preventing and detecting crime, and ensuring public safety. The Force operates under the authority of the Ministry of Home Affairs and is headed by the Inspector General of Police (IGP).

== History ==
The origins of policing in Tanzania date back to the colonial period. During German East Africa (1880s–1919), colonial authorities established paramilitary units to enforce order. Under the British mandate (1919–1961), a formal police service was developed, modeled on the British colonial policing system.

After independence in 1961, the newly formed government of Tanganyika retained the police service, later merging it with that of Zanzibar following the 1964 union to form the United Republic of Tanzania. Since then, the Tanzania Police Force has undergone reforms aimed at professionalization and modernization.

== Organizational structure ==
The Force is headquartered in Dar es Salaam and is structured into various departments and specialized units, including:

- Inspector General of the Police (IGP)
  - Chief Internal Auditor
    - Internal Audit Unit
  - Deputy Commissioner of Police
    - Communication and Public Relations Unit
  - Deputy Commissioner of Police
    - Legal Services Unit
  - Deputy Commissioner of Police
    - Internal Monitoring & Evaluation Unit
  - Deputy Commissioner of Police
    - Information Communication Technology Unit
  - Director
    - Procurement Management Unit
  - Deputy Commissioner of Police
    - TPF Corporation Sole Unit
    - Commissioner of Operation and Training
      - Police Operations Section
      - Specialized Operations Section
      - Traffic Management and Control Section
      - Development and Control Section
    - Commissioner of Criminal Investigation
      - Offences against State Security and Public Tranquility Section
      - Offences against Persons Section
      - Offences against Property Section
      - Special Investigation Support Section
      - Financial Crimes Section
      - Firearms Management Section
      - Terrorism & Trans-National Organized Crime Section
      - Interpol National Central Bureau
    - Commissioner of the Bureau of Criminal Intelligence
      - Criminal Intelligence Section
      - Criminal Analysis and Dissemination Section
      - Internal Integrity Section
    - Commissioner of the Forensic Bureau
      - Documentation and Forensic Cyber Crime Section
      - Forensic Natural Science Section
    - Commissioner of Community Policing
      - Community Engagement Section
      - Gender and Child Protection Section
    - Commissioner of the Finance and Logistics Division
      - Finance Section
      - Account Section
      - Quarter Master Section
      - Planning and Budget Section
      - Transport and Logistics Section
      - Estate Management Section
    - Commissioner of Human Resource Management and Administration
      - Human Resource Management Section
      - Administration Section
    - Commissioner of Zanzibar Police Division
      - Human Resource Management and Administration Section
      - Operations and Training Section
      - Criminal investigation Section
      - Criminal Intelligence Section
      - Finance and Logistics Section
      - Community Engagement Section
      - Forensic Bureau Section
    - Dar es Salaam Special Police Zone
      - Crisis Response Team (CRT)

Some other units the TPF has include:

- National and Transnational Serious Crimes Investigation Unit
- Field Force Unit (FFU) – riot control and crowd management.
- Marine Police Unit – patrolling coastal and inland waters.
- Maritime Operations Center
- Special Anti-Robbery and Anti-Narcotics Units – combating organized crime.

The chain of command places the IGP at the top, supported by Commissioners, Regional Police Commanders, and District Officers.

== Roles and responsibilities ==
The main functions of the Tanzania Police Force include:

- Maintaining law and order
- Preventing and detecting crime
- Regulating traffic and road safety
- Supporting border security operations in cooperation with other agencies
- Assisting in disaster response and public safety
- Community policing and public awareness campaigns

== Training and recruitment ==
Police training in Tanzania is primarily conducted at the Moshi Police Academy, along with other training schools across the country. Recruitment is carried out through the Ministry of Home Affairs, with requirements focusing on educational qualifications, physical fitness, and integrity. Continuous professional training is provided to officers to adapt to new challenges in policing.

On May 25, 2026, Tanzania's Minister of Home Affairs, Petrobas Katambi indicated that at least one hundred and fifty-seven police officers and police personnel had been sent abroad to receive specialized training in cybercrime investigations, forensic fingerprint analysis, and examination of suspicious documents. Some of the countries they were sent to included Egypt, Turkey, India, Russia, South Korea, and Brazil.

== Legal framework ==
The operations of the Tanzania Police Force are governed by the Police Force and Auxiliary Services Act (CAP 322, R.E. 2002). The Force works under the oversight of the Ministry of Home Affairs, while accountability mechanisms include parliamentary committees, internal disciplinary systems, and external watchdogs.

== Notable operations and incidents ==
In October 2015, the Tanzania Police Force arrested Yang Fenglan for ivory smuggling. Fenglan was accused of facilitating the smuggling of ivory from east Africa to China. National and Transnational Serious Crimes Investigation Unit tracked her for more than a year. On February 19, 2019, she was convicted and sentenced to fifteen years in prison. Her arrest and conviction were praised by some conservation organizations, including the World Wildlife Fund.

In October 2015, the Tanzania Police Force's National and Transnational Serious Crimes Investigation Unit (NTSCIU) arrested Boniface Matthew Malyango, along with his brothers, Lucas Mathayo Malyango and Abdallah Ally Chaoga, in Dar es Salaam after a year-long manhunt. They were arrested while attempting to smuggle 118 tusks worth over $863,000. National and Transnational Serious Crimes Investigation Unit indicated Maliango managed around fifteen poaching syndicates that have been operating throughout Tanzania, Burundi, Zambia, Mozambique, and southern Kenya for a number of years. He was accused of killing a large number of elephants in the past years.

His crimes were shown in a Netflix documentary film, The Ivory Game, that was produced by actor Leonardo DiCaprio. On March 3, 2017, Boniface and his brothers were convicted of unlawful dealing in Government trophies and leading organized crime; and were sentenced to twelve years in prison. The World Wildlife Fund congratulated the Tanzanian authorities for Boniface's arrest and successful prosecution. An appeal made by Boniface was dismissed in 2018.

However, on June 18, 2020, the convictions of Boniface and Lucas were struck down by the Court of Appeal of Tanzania in Dodoma after the court ruled that a number of pieces of evidence were not admissible. Specifically it was because the court was not able to determine if the caution statement Boniface gave was given voluntarily, and the physical evidence from the sniffer dogs and chemical analysis were not admissible due to the chain of custody of the car having been broken as it was searched several hours after the car was seized, after it had been driven to a police station in Dar es Salaam. The court also ruled that while the oral confession given at the time of his arrest was admissible, it was not enough to convict him on. Without the physical evidence from the car, the judge found that there was insufficient proof that Boniface was part of an organized crime group involved in the collection and sale of ivory.

Throughout its history, the Force has been involved in major national security operations, including:

- Combating armed robbery and organized crime
- Anti-poaching and wildlife protection campaigns
- Counter-terrorism operations in cooperation with regional security bodies
- High-profile public order management during national elections and demonstrations

== Challenges and criticism ==
Like many law enforcement agencies, the Tanzania Police Force faces challenges such as inadequate resources, corruption allegations, and human rights concerns. Local and international organizations have called for reforms to improve accountability, professionalism, and public trust in the Force.

In 2018, a series of protests demanding Tanzanian President John Magufuli be removed from office occurred on April 26, 2018, in order coincide with the anniversary of the union between mainland Tanzania and the Indian Ocean archipelago of Zanzibar, by Mange Kimambi, a pro-democracy who moved to the United States in self-imposed exile. Some Tanzanian government officials, including Gilles Muroto, the police chief of Tanzania's administrative capital Dodoma at that time, and President John Magufuli, indicated they would crack down on these protests before they occurred. On April 24, 2018, Tanzanian police arrested seven people in Arusha who were accused of mobilizing fellow Tanzanians to take part in the planned protests. The United States embassy in Tanzania issued an alert, advising its citizens to keep a low profile, over the possibility of violence happening at the demonstrations.

On May 22, 2026, the United States State Department placed sanctions on TPF Senior Assistant Commissioner Faustine Jackson Mafwele. Mafwele was accused of detaining, torturing, and sexually assaulting Ugandan Agather Atuhaire and Kenyan Boniface Mwangi, who were in Dar es Salaam to observe the judicial trial of opposition leader Tundu Lissu. He was prohibited from entering the United States. However, Tanzania's Foreign Affairs Minister Mahmoud Thabit Kombo told BBC that the government had not yet received the formal designation, which bars Mafwele from entering the US. Tanzanian Police Force denied the torture allegations at the time.

== See also ==
- Law enforcement in Tanzania
- Ministry of Home Affairs (Tanzania)
- Judiciary of Tanzania
