= List of wars involving Madagascar =

This is a list of wars and conflicts involving malagasy tribes, Merina Kingdom and later Madagascar since the sixteenth century to the present.

Conflict	Combatant 1	Combatant 2	Results
Malagasy-Portuguese war (1548)	Antanosy Matitanese	Portuguese Empire	Victory: Failure of Portuguese colonization
Antanosy-French war (1643–1674)	Antanosy	France	Victory: Destruction of French colony of Fort-Dauphin
Gourbeyre expedition (1829–1830)	Merina Kingdom	France	Victory: France failed to regain the lost colonies of Tintingue, Foulepointe and Tamatave
French-British expedition of 1845	Merina Kingdom	France; United Kingdom	Victory: French and British troops destroyed
First Franco-Hova War (1883–1885)	Merina Kingdom	France	Defeat: Establishment of the Malagasy Protectorate
Second Franco-Hova War (1894–1895)	Merina Kingdom	France	Defeat: Madagascar annexed by France
Menalamba Rebellion (1895–1897)	Menalamba rebels	France	Defeat: Rebellion put down by French authorities
1904–1905 uprising in Madagascar (1904–1905)	Antesaka; Sahafatra; Antanosy rebels	France	Defeat: Rebellion put down by French authorities
Sadiavahy Rebellion (1905-1917)	Bara; Antandroy rebels	France	Defeat: Rebellion put down by French authorities
Malagasy Uprising (1947–1949)	MDRM	France	Defeat: Uprising failed
