= Ministry of Home Affairs (Tanzania) =

Government ministry of Tanzania

- Wizara ya Mambo ya Ndani (Swahili)

Ministry overview
- Jurisdiction: Government of Tanzania
- Headquarters: Ghana Street, Dar es Salaam; 6°48′45″S 39°17′17″E
- Minister responsible: George Simbachawene
- Deputy Minister responsible: Hamad Masauni
- Ministry executive: Permanent secretary
- Website: www.moha.go.tz

The Ministry of Home Affairs is a government ministry of Tanzania. Its mission is to "save lives and properties, facilitate and control movement of aliens and non-aliens, assist refugees, and rehabilitate convicts through implementation of relevant laws and regulations." The police force, prisons service, immigration service, fire and rescue force, refugees service, and community service are departments of the ministry.

== See also ==
- Minister of Home Affairs (Tanzania)
