= Corruption in Madagascar =

Corruption in Madagascar is pervasive and is exacerbated by political instability and poverty. In 2024, Madagascar ranked 140th out of 180 territories in Transparency International’s Corruption Perception Index.

== Network of corruption ==
The severity of the high-level corruption in Madagascar has been highlighted by the case of former Prime Minister Jean Ravelonarivo. In 2021, he was found guilty of corruption and was punished with five years imprisonment and a fine of 6 billion ariary or about $1.5 million. The charges involved fraudulent contracts and the embezzlement of funds, which he committed during his term (2015-2016). He did not serve time in prison because he fled to Switzerland after he was convicted. Aside from Ravelonarivo, other officials were also involved and had to leave the country to avoid prosecution. These include Raoul Arizaka Rabekoto, who was a director of the state company during Ravelonarivo’s administration. These cases highlight the level of corruption and public malfeasance in Madagascar. Despite attempts to deal with the problem, it still persists and continues to undermine the development and effective governance of the country.

The systemic nature of corruption in Madagascar can also be demonstrated in the case of the natural resource industry. For example, artisanal gold mining is controlled by traders in collusion with government officials. The process of granting mining licenses is also noted for being arbitrary and discretionary, allowing for corruption to flourish.

Smuggling is also a significant source of public malfeasance in Madagascar, exploiting the country's weak rule of law. Organized smuggling syndicates operate extensive networks, trafficking valuable resources such as rosewood — which is highly sought after in China — and engaging in wildlife trafficking. These illicit activities are deeply intertwined with patronage networks that reach into the highest levels of political power. The substantial profits generated by these criminal enterprises are subsequently laundered through both Madagascar's formal financial system and informal channels.

== Corruption and political instability ==
After Madagascar gained its independence from France in 1960, it endured a series of military coups and political crises. This created political instability that continues to hamper the subsequent attempts to reduce corruption in the public sector. Protracted conflicts and political crises have weakened state institutions, crippling the enforcement of anti-corruption measures. This is further aggravated by the lack of strong governance structures that make it challenging to hold those guilty of malfeasance accountable. In 2013, there was a return to democratic elections and some semblance of stability began to emerge but government corruption still exists.

=== State capture ===
Mamy Ravatomanga—a businessman and a close advisor of former President Andry Rajoelina, as well as one of his key financial backers—is often portrayed as the primary face of state capture by private interests during Rajoelina's administration. As the island's second-wealthiest individual, he faces accusations of monopolizing certain sectors of the Malagasy economy, exerting significant influence over administrative appointments and decisions, harnessing public institutions to serve his own interests, and enjoying judicial impunity despite being implicated in several financial crime cases.

== Legal and institutional frameworks ==
Madagascar addresses its corruption problem through the following frameworks:

- Independent Anti-Corruption Bureau (BIANCO): This is the primary anti-corruption agency in Madagascar and is mandated to investigate corruption cases, raise awareness about corruption and its risks, and advise the government on anti-corruption policies.
- Legislations: There are various laws that criminalize corruption, including bribery, embezzlement, and influence peddling. There are also existing laws that mandate the declaration of assets for public officials. These legal mechanisms have been criticized due to the inconsistency of their enforcement.

== International rankings ==
In Transparency International's 2025 Corruption Perceptions Index, Madagascar scored 25 on a scale from 0 ("highly corrupt") to 100 ("very clean"). When ranked by score, Madagascar ranked 148th among the 182 countries in the Index, where the country ranked first is perceived to have the most honest public sector. For comparison with regional scores, the best score among sub-Saharan African countries (Note: Angola, Benin, Botswana, Burkina Faso, Burundi, Cameroon, Cape Verde, Central African Republic, Chad, Comoros, Côte d'Ivoire, Democratic Republic of the Congo, Djibouti, Equatorial Guinea, Eritrea, Eswatini, Ethiopia, Gabon, Gambia, Ghana, Guinea, Guinea-Bissau, Kenya, Lesotho, Liberia, Madagascar, Malawi, Mali, Mauritania, Mauritius, Mozambique, Namibia, Niger, Nigeria, Republic of the Congo, Rwanda, Sao Tome and Principe, Senegal, Seychelles, Sierra Leone, Somalia, South Africa, South Sudan, Sudan, Tanzania, Togo, Uganda, Zambia, and Zimbabwe.) was 68, the average was 32 and the worst was 9. For comparison with worldwide scores, the best score was 89 (ranked 1), the average was 42, and the worst was 9 (ranked 181, in a two-way tie).
