= Samifin =

The Financial Intelligence Unit of Madagascar (Malagasy: Sampan-draharaha Malagasy Iadiana amin'ny Famotsiam-bola, SAMIFIN; or French: Service de Renseignements Financiers, SRF) is a national law enforcement agency, and acts as an independent body in Madagascar. Its objectives are to clean up the financial sector in Madagascar and combat illicit financial flows that are linked to money laundering activities, terrorism financing, economic and funding infractions, and organized crime. It is subordinate to the President of Madagascar.

== History ==
It was founded on July 18, 2007 by Malagasy President Marc Ravalomanana, it is based upon Law 2004-020 (August 19, 2004), which details the tracking and confiscation of illegal products, and Decree 2007-510 (June 4, 2007), which details the creation, organization, and operation of the organization. On July 8, 2026, the Financial Intelligence Unit of Madagascar was admitted into the Egmont Group during a meeting in Baku, Azerbaijan.

== Organization ==
It is led by a Director General. It's leadership is made up of four technical directors and one support director.

== Training ==
SAMIFIN, with financial support from the United Nations Office on Drugs and Crime (UNODC), organized and took part in workshop dealing with the identification, investigation and recovery of virtual assets between August 3, 2026 and August 8, 2026 at the SAMIFIN Ilohay Center. Other agencies that took part in this workshop included INTERPOL, Illicit Assets Recovery Agency of Madagascar (IARA, French: Agence de Recouvrement des Avoirs Illicites, ARAI), Malagasy Independent Anti-Corruption Bureau (IACB, French: Bureau Indépendant Anti-Corruption, BIANCO), Malagasy National Police, Malagasy National Gendarmerie, Central Intelligence Service (CIS), and some other anti-corruption agencies.
