= Madagascar Armed Forces =

Combined military forces of Madagascar

- French: Forces armées de Madagascar; Malagasy: Tafika Malagasy
- Founded: 16th century
- Current form: 1960
- Service branches: Malagasy Army; Malagasy Air Force; Malagasy Navy; National Gendarmerie
- Headquarters: Antananarivo

Leadership
- Commander-in-chief: Colonel Michael Randrianirina
- Minister of National Defense: Deramasinjaka Manantsoa Rakotoarivelo
- Chief of Staff: General Demosthene Pikulas

Personnel
- Conscription: 18 months (military and non-military service)
- Active personnel: 13,500 (military); 8,100 (National Gendarmerie)

Related articles
- Ranks: Military ranks of Madagascar

The Madagascar Armed Forces (French: Forces armées de Madagascar, Malagasy: Tafika Malagasy) is the national military of Madagascar. As of 2025, the Malagasy armed forces consist of an Army of 12,500, a Navy of 500, and a 500-strong Air Force.

During World War II, Malagasy troops fought in France, Morocco, and Syria. The armed forces were involved in the 2009 Malagasy political crisis and the 2025 Malagasy protests, playing a central role in the subsequent 2025 Malagasy mutiny. The Malagasy Armed Forces assists the gendarmerie in performing law enforcement tasks in rural areas in Madagascar, specifically by combating banditry and cattle theft.

== History ==
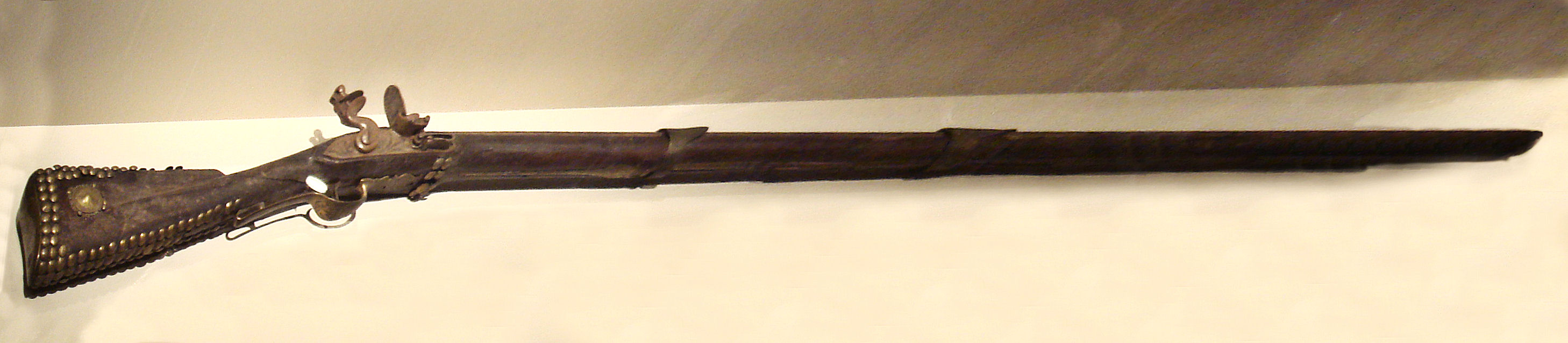
A flintlock gun seized in Madagascar by France in 1898, now displayed at the Muséum d'Histoire naturelle de La Rochelle.

The rise of centralized kingdoms among the Sakalava, Merina and other ethnic groups produced the island's first standing armies, first equipped with spears, but later with muskets, cannons and other firearms. King Ralambo (1575–1612) raised the first standing army in the highland Kingdom of Imerina with a handful of guns, although for at least two centuries the armies of the Sakalava were much larger and better equipped, possessing thousands of muskets obtained principally through trade with European partners. By the early 19th century, however, the army of the Kingdom of Imerina was able to bring much of the island under Merina control.

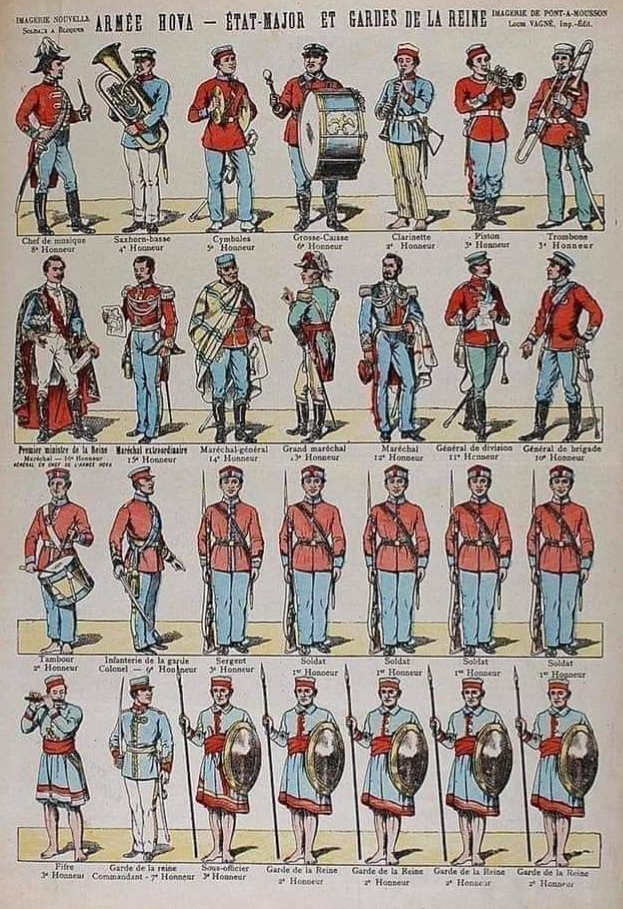
Military ranks of the Kingdom of Imerina military in the 19th century. Hierarchy from lower to upper class soldiers.

Merina Queen Ranavalona, like her predecessors, utilized the tradition of fanampoana (service due to the sovereign in lieu of taxes) to conscript a large portion of the population of Imerina into military service, enabling the queen to raise a standing army that was estimated at 20,000 to 30,000 soldiers.

By the late 19th century French plans to colonize Madagascar were gaining momentum, leading British mercenaries to provide training to the queen's army in an unsuccessful bid to repel the French troops. Madagascar was colonized in 1896, and during World War II over 46,000 Malagasy soldiers were drafted to fight with the Allies, over 2,000 of whom died fighting for France.

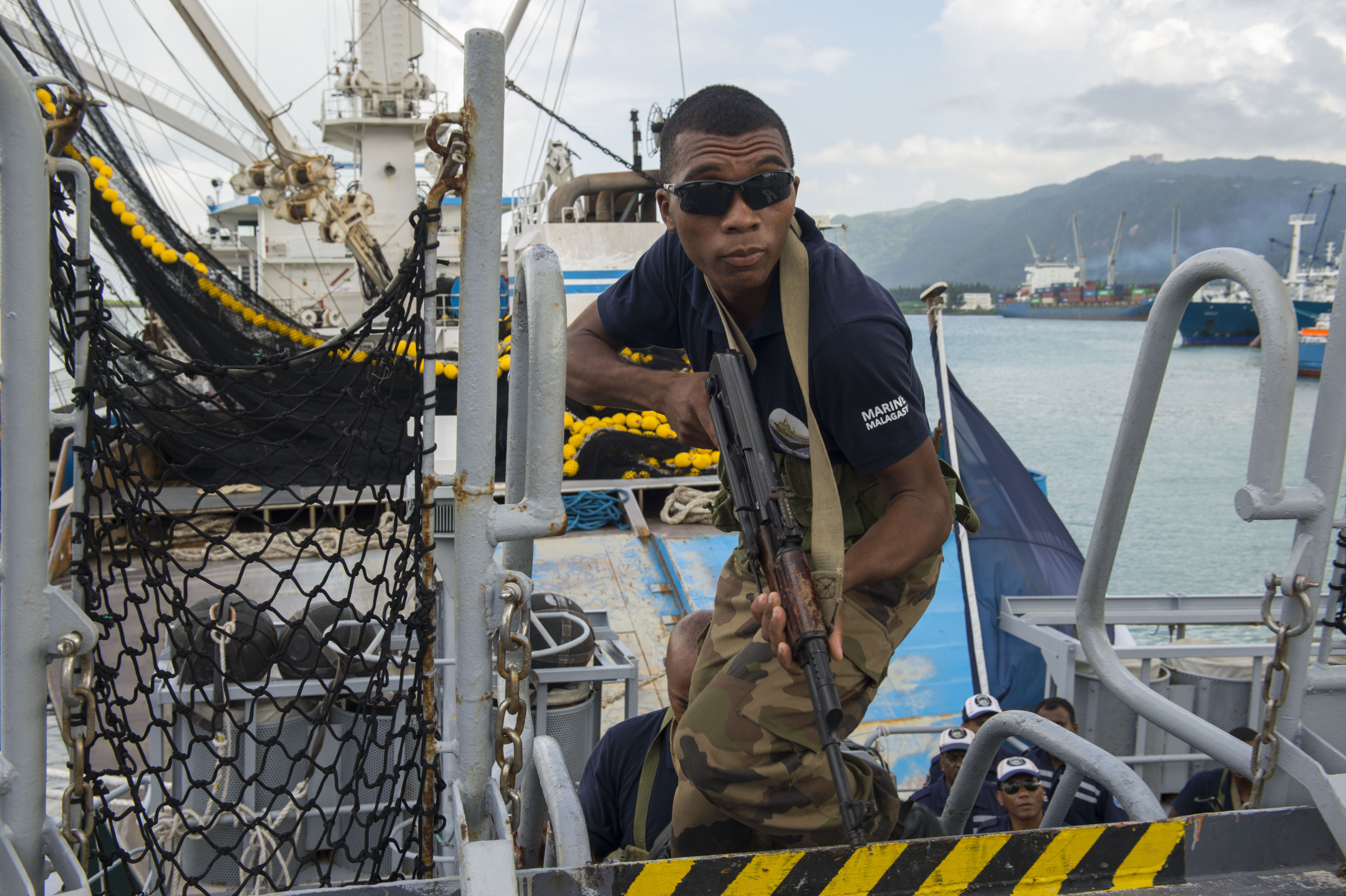
Madagascar boarding party trains by boarding Le Floreal, a French naval vessel, during Operation Cutlass Express 2016

Madagascar gained political independence and sovereignty over its military in 1960. Since this time Madagascar has never engaged in an armed conflict, whether against another state or within its own borders. As such the armed forces of Madagascar have primarily served a peacekeeping role. However, the military has occasionally intervened to restore order during periods of political unrest. When President Philibert Tsiranana was forced to step down in 1972, a military directorate ensured an interim government before appointing one of its own, Admiral Didier Ratsiraka, to lead the country into its socialist Second Republic. He launched a strategy of obligatory national armed or civil service for all young citizens regardless of gender. The majority were channeled into civil service, including agriculture and education programs for rural development based on the socialist Soviet model. Ratsiraka would also mobilize elements of the military to pacify unarmed protesters, occasionally using violent means. His order to fire upon unarmed protesters in 1989 was the catalyst for transition to the democratic Third Republic in 1992. The military remained largely neutral during the protracted standoff between incumbent Ratsiraka and challenger Marc Ravalomanana in the disputed 2001 presidential elections. By contrast, in 2009 a segment of the army defected to the side of Andry Rajoelina, then-mayor of Antananarivo, in support of his attempt to force President Ravalomanana from power. It is widely believed that payoffs were involved in persuading these military personnel to change camps in support of the coup d'état.

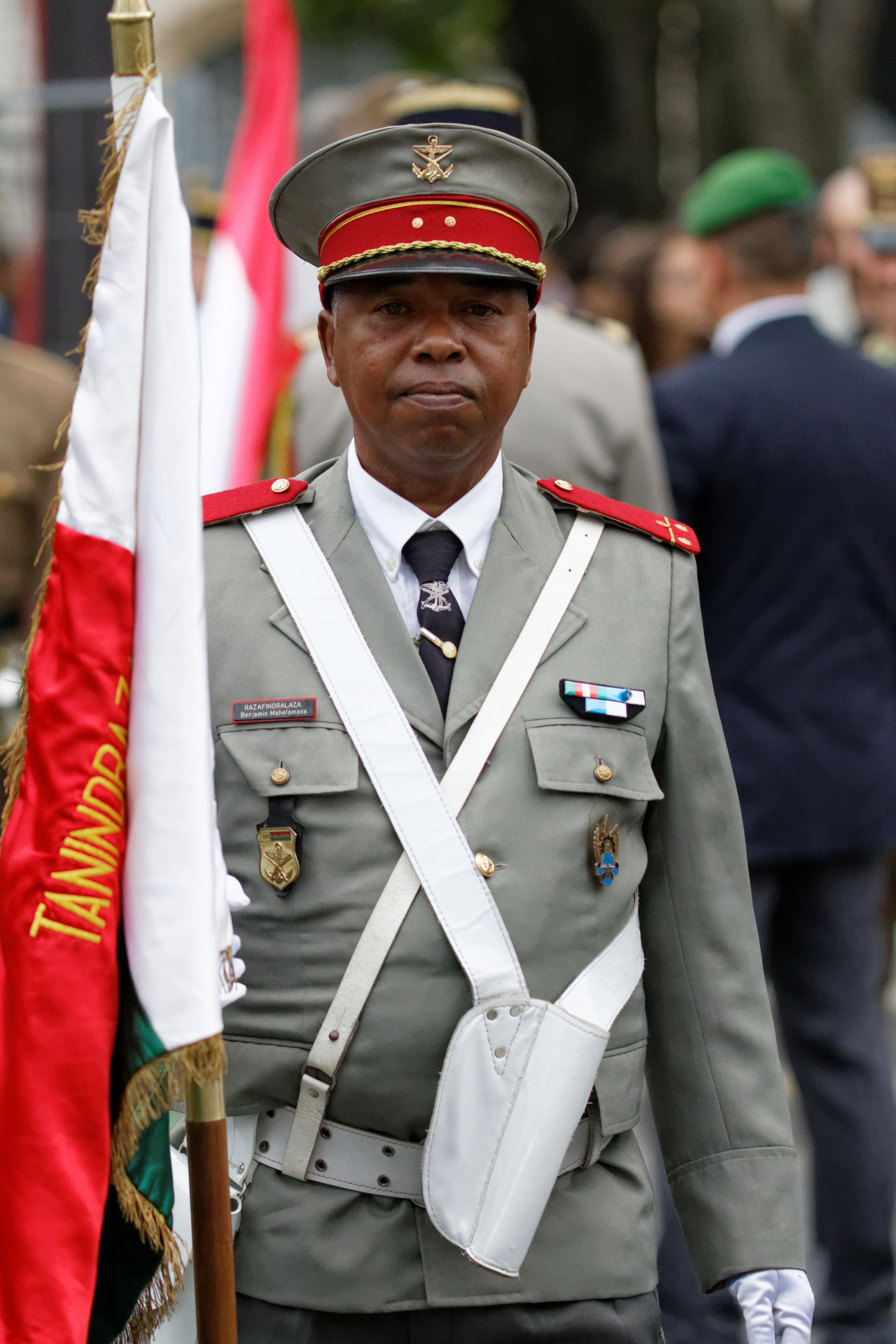
A soldier of Madagascar Armed Forces in Paris on Bastille Day 2014

As of 2010, the military of Madagascar is composed of the 8,100 paramilitary of the National Gendarmerie and the 13,500 members of the Armed Forces. The CIA Factbook describes the Armed Forces as consisting of the Intervention Force, Aeronaval Force (navy and air) and the Development Force. Military service is voluntary and limited to males aged 18 to 25; every citizen of either gender is required to perform either military or civil service for a minimum of 18 months. However, because of a lack of up-to-date census data, this requirement is not currently enforced. The Gendarmerie recruits Malagasy citizens between the ages of 20 and 30 (or 35 if the recruit has prior military service). Military expenses constituted just over one percent of GDP. Under Ravalomanana, military expenditure doubled from 54 million USD in 2006 to 103 million USD in 2008.

== Equipment ==
=== Army ===
==== Small arms ====
Name	Image	Caliber	Type	Origin	Notes
Pistols
TT-33		7.62×25mm	Semi-automatic pistol	Soviet Union	
MAC 50		9×19mm	Semi-automatic pistol	French Fourth Republic / France	
M1911		.45 ACP	Semi-automatic pistol	United States	
Rifles
SKS		7.62×39mm	Semi-automatic rifle	Soviet Union	
AKM		7.62×39mm	Assault rifle	Soviet Union	
AK-74		5.45×39mm	Assault rifle	Soviet Union	
Type 63		7.62×39mm	Assault rifle	China	
Type 56		7.62×39mm	Assault rifle	China	
Machine guns
DShK		12.7×108mm	Heavy machine gun	Soviet Union	
AA-52		7.5×54mm	General-purpose machine gun	French Fourth Republic / France	
Browning M2		.50 BMG	Heavy machine gun	United States	
Rocket propelled grenade launchers
RPG-7		40mm	Rocket-propelled grenade	Soviet Union	
LRAC F1		89mm	Shoulder-launched missile weapon	France	

==== Armoured fighting vehicles ====
Model	Image	Origin	Quantity	Details
Light tanks
PT-76		Soviet Union	12	
BMP-3		Soviet Union	2	
Reconnaissance
BRDM-2		Soviet Union	~35	
FV701 Ferret		United Kingdom	10	
M3A1		United States	~20	
M8		United States	8	
Armoured personnel carriers
Panthera T4		United Arab Emirates	6	

==== Anti-tank/anti-infrastructure ====
Model	Image	Origin	Caliber	Quantity	Details
Recoilless rifles
M40A1		United States	106mm	Not stated	

==== Artillery ====
Model	Image	Origin	Caliber	Quantity	Details
Towed
M101		United States	105mm	5	
D-30		Soviet Union	122mm	12	
Mortars
M-37		Soviet Union	82mm	Not stated	
M-43		Soviet Union	120mm	8	

==== Air defence ====
Model	Image	Origin	Caliber	Quantity	Details
Towed
ZPU-4		Soviet Union	14.5mm	50	
PG-55		Soviet Union	37mm	20	

=== Navy ===
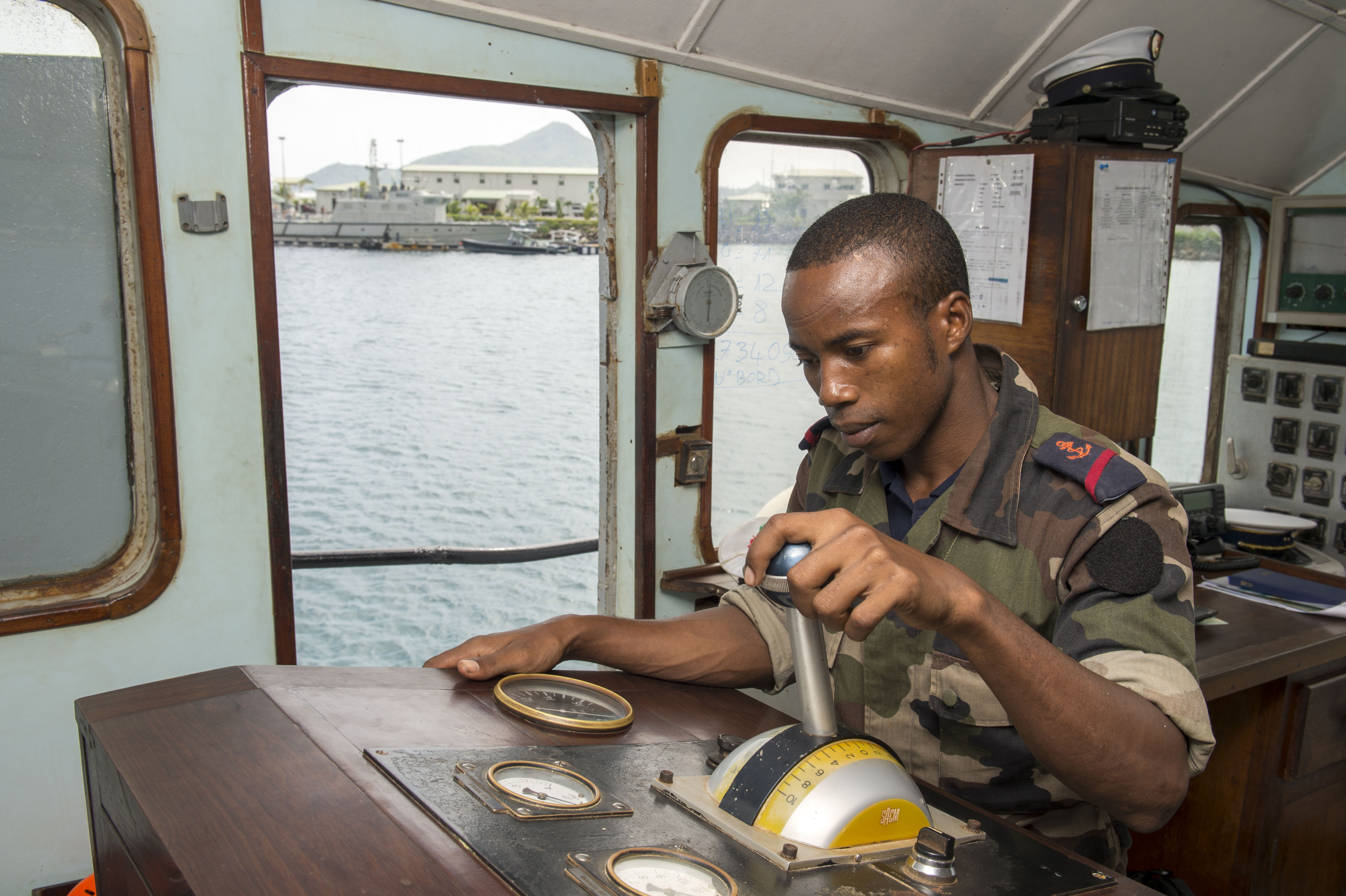
Bridge of the offshore patrol vessel RC Trozona

- Coastal patrol boat:
  - Trozona
- Patrol boats:
  - 2 Tselatra and Malaky
  - 7 patrol launch
- S330 ISR

=== Air force ===
The AAM's roundel is based on the Flag of Madagascar.

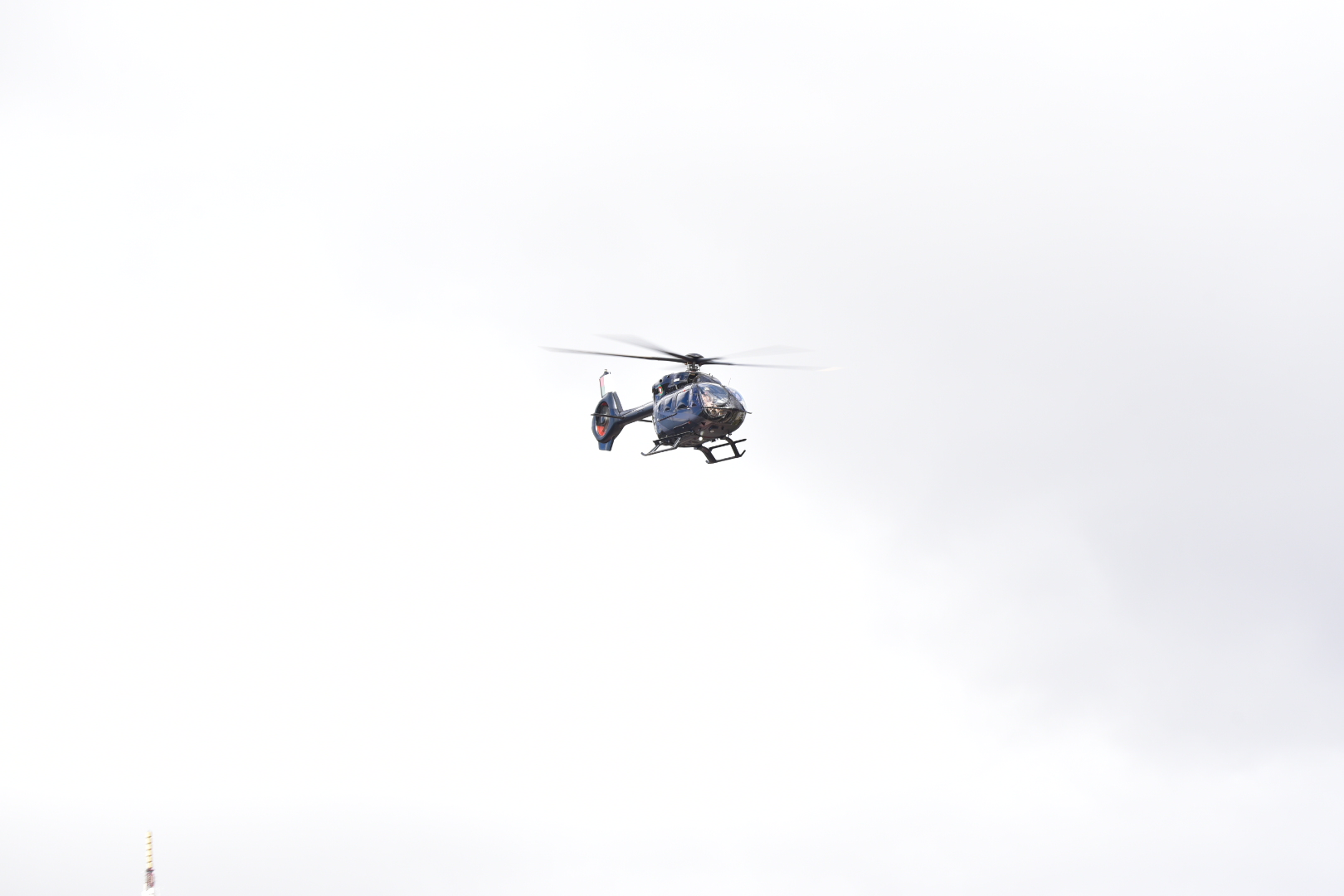
Malagasy Air Force Helicopter

Model	Origin	Quantity	Details
Transport
Cessna 172	United States	4	
Let L-410 Turbolet	United States	1	
Cessna 206	United States	6	
Cessna 310	United States	1	
Cessna 337	United States	2	
PA-23	United States	1	
B-737	United States	2	
CN235M	Spain Europe / Indonesia	1	
J.300	France	2	
Tetras	France	1	
Yak-40	Soviet Union	4	
Helicopters
SA318C	France	3	
AS350	France	3	
Mi-8	Russia	2	
BK117	West Germany / Japan	1	

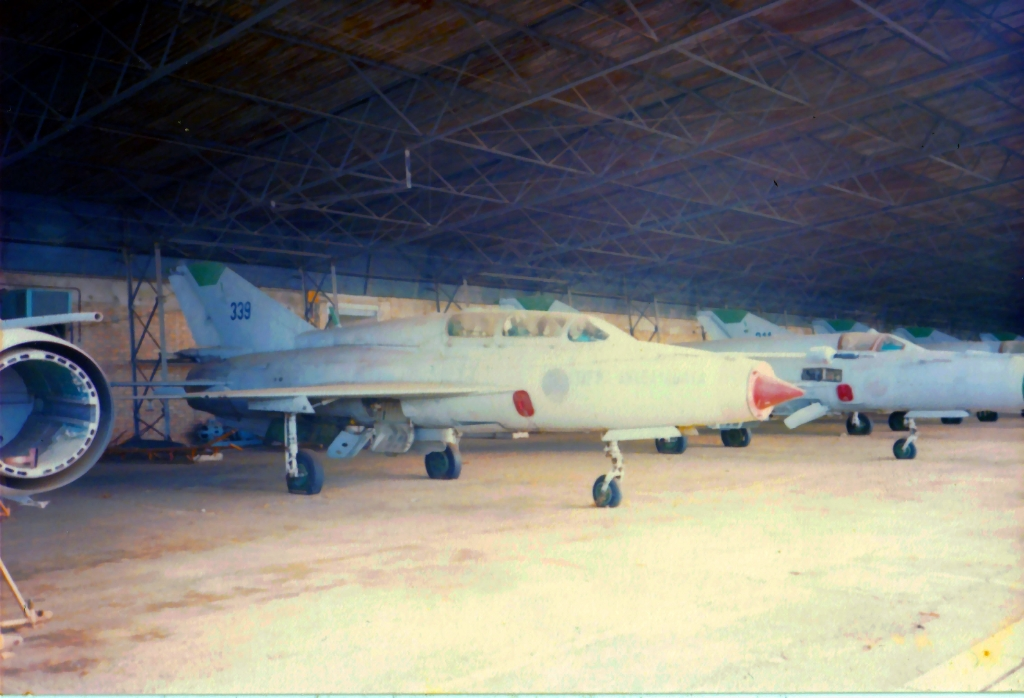
MiG-21 of the Malagasy Air Force.

== See also ==
- Ministry of National Defense (Madagascar)
- List of wars involving Madagascar

== Bibliography ==
- Bradt, Hilary (2011). Madagascar, 10th Ed.: The Bradt Travel Guide. London: Bradt Travel Guides. ISBN 978-1-84162-341-2.
- "Madagascar". Jane's World Armies (online edition). IHS Jane's. 19 May 2011.
- World Aircraft Information Files. Brightstar Publishing, London. File 339 Sheet 01
