= Analaiva =

- Location in Madagascar
- Coordinates: 20°20′S 44°30′E
- Country: Madagascar
- Region: Menabe
- District: Morondava
- Elevation: 34 m (112 ft)

Population (2001)
  - Total: 18,000
- Time zone: UTC3 (EAT)

Analaiva is a town and commune (Malagasy: kaominina) in Madagascar. It belongs to the district of Morondava, which is a part of Menabe Region. The population of the commune was estimated to be approximately 18,000 in 2001 commune census.

Primary and junior level secondary education are available in town. The majority 70% of the population of the commune are farmers, while an additional 15% receives their livelihood from raising livestock. The most important crop is sugar cane of which 17.000 tons are treated annually in the Sucoma sugar factory.
