= Philippe Jean =

Philippe Jean is a name. People with that name include:

- Philippe Jean (also spelled Philip Jean), a painter
- Philippe Jean (footballer), a footballer
