= Madagascar Navy =

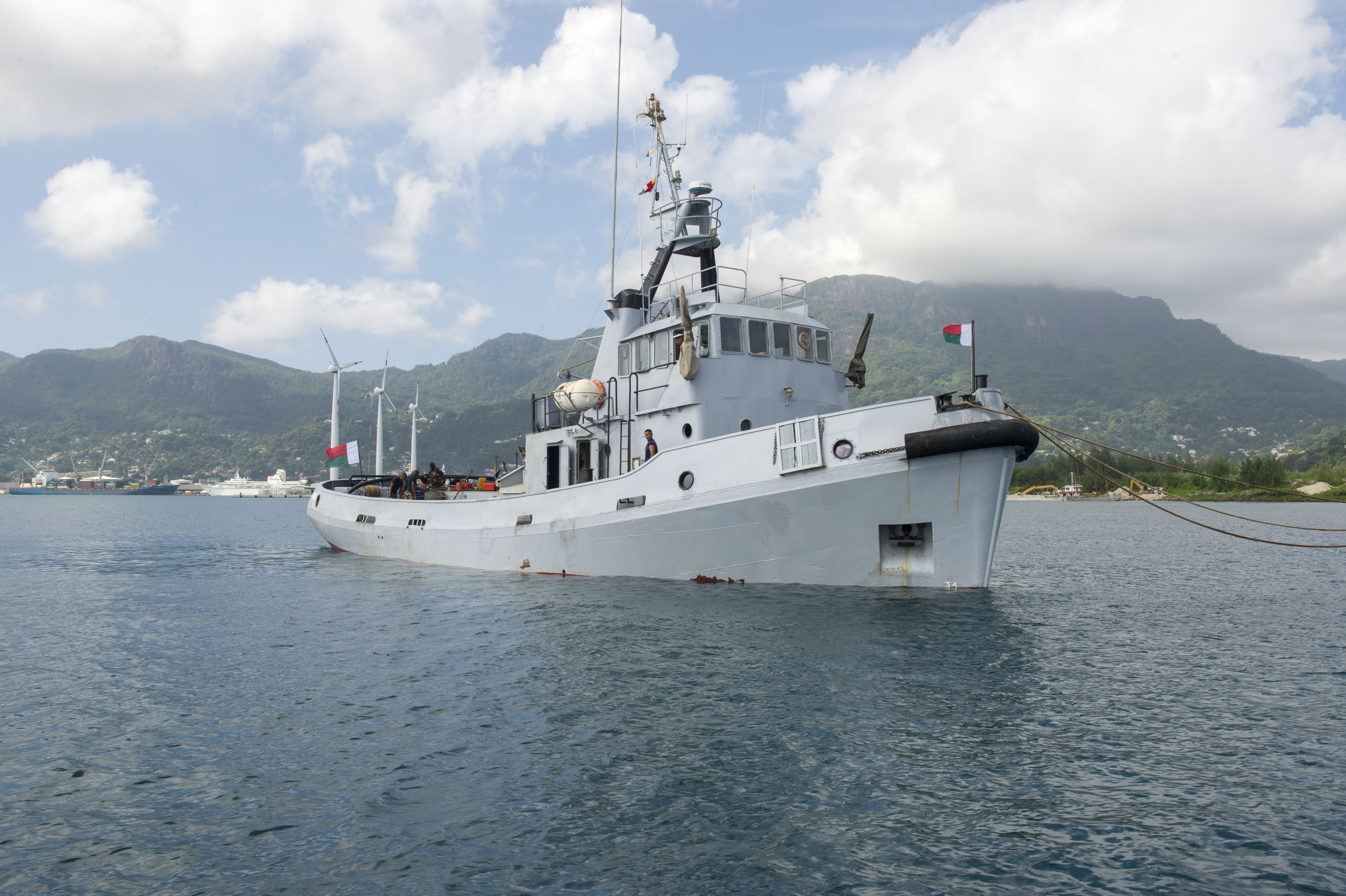
- RC Trozona
- Active: 1960–present
- Country: Madagascar
- Type: Navy
- Size: 500 personnel
- Part of: Madagascar Armed Forces
- Equipment: 7 watercraft

Insignia
- Ensign

The Madagascar Navy (French: Marine de Madagascar) is the navy branch of the Madagascar Armed Forces.

The Madagascar Navy is under-equipped and experiences difficulties in accomplishing its mission of controlling and suppression illegal fishing in the Malagasy exclusive economic zone (EEZ), maritime law enforcement, and maritime search and rescue.

== Current fleet list ==
Class	Type	Origin	In Service	Notes	Photo
Engin de débarquement d'infanterie et de chars (LOA 59.0 m)	Landing craft	France	Aina Vao Vao	Armed with 2 x 20 mm cannons and 81 mm mortar gun	
Chamois class patrol boat (LOA 41.0 m)	Supply tug / coastal utility	France	Matsilo	Armed with 2 x 12.7 mm machine guns / Currently nonoperational	
30 metres tugboat	Offshore patrol vessel	Madagascar	RC Trozona	Armed with 12.7 mm machine guns	
26 metres patrol boat	Coastal patrol vessel	China	2 units: Tselatra; Malaky	Armed with 1 x 12.7 mm machine gun	
SAR boat 44 ft (13 m)	Patrol launch	United States	V11-16	Armed with 1 x 12.7 mm machine gun	
Metal Shark Defiant Response Boat 38 ft (12 m)	Speedboat	United States	Akio	average speed 40 mph (35 kn; 64 km/h)	

== Bases ==
The main base of the Malagasy Navy is Antsiranana, which previously served as a base for the colonial French Navy. Naval detachments are also found in Nosy-Be, Mahajanga, Ile Sainte-Marie and in Fort-Dauphin.
