= East German mark =

Currency of East Germany from 1948 to 1990

Mark of the German Democratic Republic
Mark der Deutschen Demokratischen Republik (German)
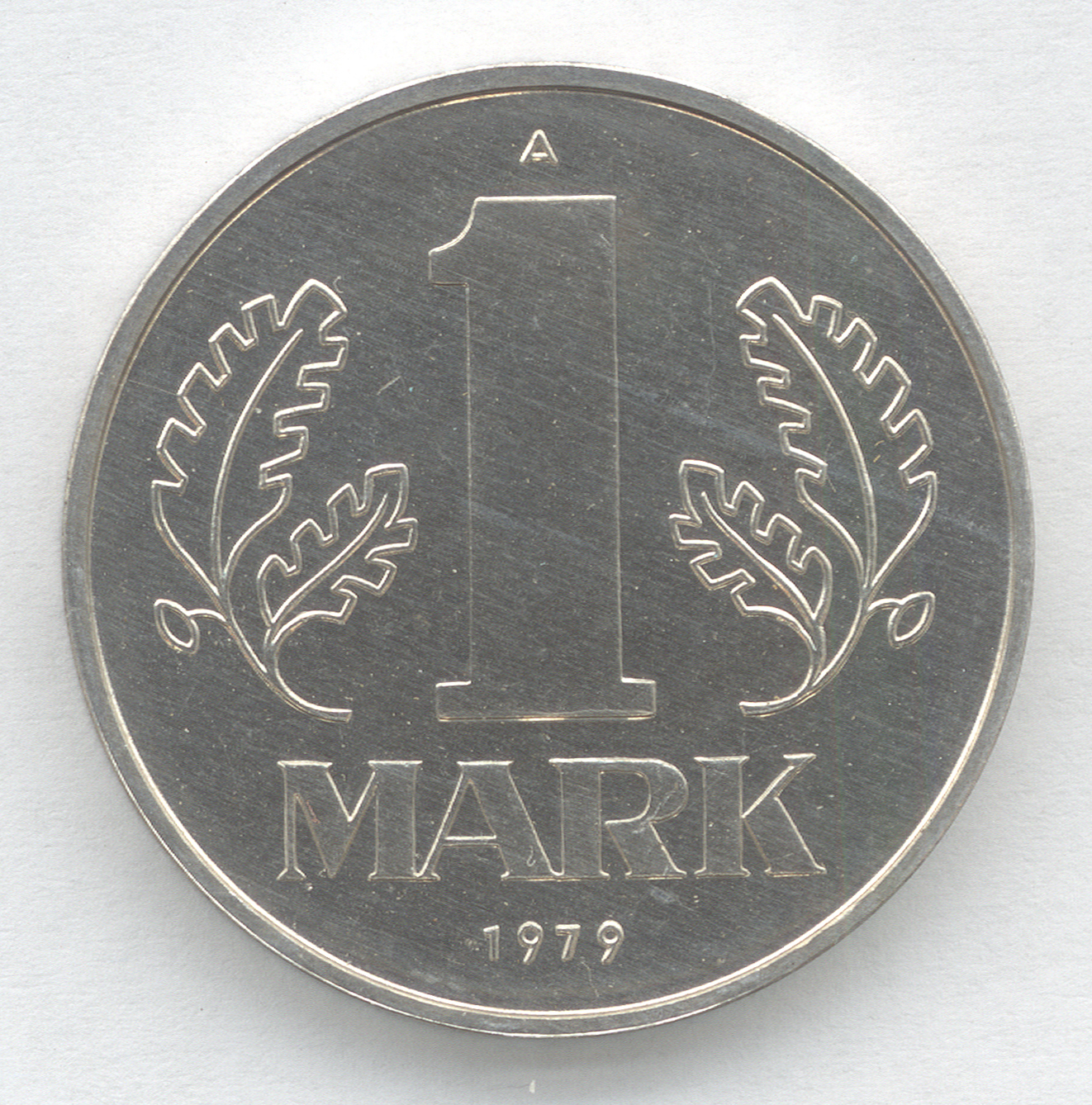
- M1 coin

ISO 4217
- Code: DDM

Units of account
- Plural: Marks
- Symbol: M
- Nickname: alu-chips
- Subunit
- 1/100: Pfennig
- Plural
- Pfennig: Pfennigs
- Symbol
- Pfennig: pf

Denominations
- Banknotes: M5, M10, M20, M50, M100, M200^{b}, M500^{b}
- Coins
- Freq. used: 1pf, 5pf, 10pf, 20pf, 50pf, M1, M2
- Rarely used: M5, M10, M20 (commemorative)

Demographics
- User(s): Soviet occupation zone; German Democratic Republic

Issuance
- Central bank: Staatsbank der DDR

Valuation
- Pegged with: Deutsche Mark = (DM1 – M1)^{a}
- This infobox shows the latest status before this currency was rendered obsolete.^a The East German mark was officially a nonconvertible domestic currency. ^b The 200- and 500-mark notes were printed, but never released into circulation.

The East German mark (German: Mark der DDR [ˈmaʁk deːɐ̯ ˌdeːdeːˈʔɛʁ]), commonly called the eastern mark (German: Ostmark [ˈɔstmaʁk]) in West Germany and after reunification, was the currency of the German Democratic Republic (East Germany). Its ISO 4217 currency code was DDM. The currency was known officially as the Deutsche Mark from 1948 to 1964, Mark der Deutschen Notenbank from 1964 to 1967, and from 1968 to 1990 as the Mark der DDR (Mark of the GDR). The mark (M) was divided into 100 pfennigs (pf).

== History ==
East German currencies
| Name | Abbr. | Introduced | Retired |
|---|---|---|---|
| Deutsche Mark | DM | 31 October 1951 | 31 July 1964 |
| Mark der Deutschen Notenbank | MDN | 1 August 1964 | 31 December 1967 |
| Mark der DDR | M | 1 January 1968 | 30 June 1990 |

=== 1948 ===
On 18 June 1948 a currency reform was announced for the western zones. Subsequently, on 20 June 1948, the Reichsmark and the Rentenmark were abolished in the western occupation zones due to Soviet counterfeiting of AM-Marks resulting in economic instability and inflation and replaced with the Deutsche Mark issued by the Bank deutscher Länder (later the Deutsche Bundesbank). Because the Reichsmark was still legal tender in the Soviet occupation zone, the currency flooded into the east from the west, where it was worthless. This caused sudden inflation, which caused privately held cash in the Soviet zone to become worthless overnight. As an emergency measure, many thousands of employees in the district offices started to affix adhesive coupons to those reichsmark and rentenmark banknotes for which the owners could prove their origin, up to a limit of 70 ℛ︁ℳ︁ per person. Only such banknotes could be exchanged when the Deutsche Notenbank (the East German counterpart of the Bundesbank) issued the new Deutsche Mark with the subsequent currency reform.

Although the Soviets expressed surprise about the western currency reform at the time, the German Economic Commission, per consultation with the Soviet Military Administration had prepared for this situation. The adhesive coupons had already been printed and, with logistic assistance by the Soviets, distributed among the district offices. First affixings of the coupons started immediately, already on 19 June 1948. On 23 June 1948, the official starting day of the action, a considerable store of primed banknotes was already available. This enabled to reduce waiting times and to accelerate the process by exchanging these notes for unprimed banknotes.

On 24 July 1948, a completely new series of banknotes was issued. It maintained the official name Deutsche Mark von der Deutschen Notenbank until 1964, but it was known, especially in the west, as the Ostmark, or eastern mark.

=== 1960s ===
From 1964 to 1967, the East German mark was officially designated as the Mark der Deutschen Notenbank (MDN). With the constitutional amendments of 1968 and 1974, the leadership of East Germany moved away from the original goal of a unified Germany, using the phrase "... of the GDR" where earlier they would simply have said "German ...". In this way the name of the currency was changed from MDN to Mark der Deutschen Demokratischen Republik (Mark der DDR) (M), or "Mark of the GDR", and the name of the state bank from Deutsche Notenbank to Staatsbank der DDR. Coins minted before the renaming, with the legend Deutsche Mark (i.e., in DM 1 and DM 2 denominations), continued to circulate for several years, but they were gradually replaced by the early 1980s by coins with the legend Mark.

=== International exchange ===
The East German mark was officially valued by the East German government at parity with the (West German) Deutsche Mark. However, due to limited convertibility and a restricted export profile, it was essentially worthless outside of East Germany. The few East Germans able to visit the West often found themselves having to rely on their West German relatives as a result.

Beginning in 1964, the East German government instituted a Zwangsumtausch (forced exchange, or Mindestumtausch – minimum exchange), whereby most visitors from non-socialist foreign countries were required to exchange a set daily amount in Deutsche Marks or other hard currency for East German marks at the rate of one Deutsche Mark to one East German mark. From 13 October 1980, Western visitors to the GDR were required to exchange a minimum of DM25 per day for East German marks. Some exceptions were authorized; for example, tourists who booked hotel stays in the GDR paid in hard currency (almost always for more than DM 25 daily) were exempted. At other times, West Berliners, retirees, children, and young people were granted either exemptions or reduced daily rates. Members of the Western Allied military forces stationed in West Berlin were also exempt from these rules when visiting East Berlin, in part because the Western Allies did not recognize the authority of the GDR to regulate the activities of their military personnel in East Berlin; only the Soviet Union was considered entitled to do so.

On the black market, the exchange rate was about 5 to 10 Mark der DDR to one Deutsche Mark. In the mid-1980s, one could easily visit foreign currency exchange offices in West Berlin and purchase East German banknotes (in denominations of 50 and 100 Mark der DDR) at the rate of M 5 (East) = DM 1 (West). The East German mark could not be spent in Intershops to acquire Western consumer goods; only hard currencies or Forum checks were accepted. Consequently the main purchasers of black market East German currency were Allied military personnel entering East Berlin, who were exempt from East German customs inspection.

=== Adoption of the West German Deutsche Mark ===
Upon adoption of the Deutsche Mark in East Germany on 1 July 1990, the East German Mark was converted at par for wages, prices and basic savings (up to a limit of M 4,000 per person, for children up to and including 14 years of age (the qualifying date was the day of the currency union) M 2,000 and for persons aged 60+ M 6,000). Larger amounts of savings, company debts and housing loans were converted at a 2:1 rate whilst so-called "speculative money", acquired shortly before unification, was converted at a rate of 3:1. These inflated exchange rates were intended by the government of the Federal Republic of Germany as a massive subsidy for eastern Germany, and remain controversial among economists, with some arguing that the exchange of currency was the most practical way of quickly unifying the German economy, and others arguing that the exchange increased the disruption caused by German unification by, among other things, making eastern German industries uncompetitive.

==== Destruction of East German currency ====
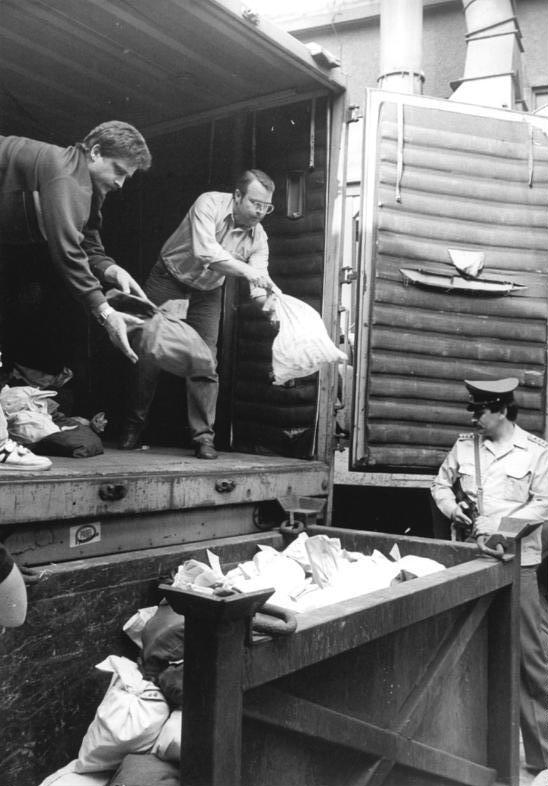
Unloading sacks of coins from the Staatsbank for destruction, 1990

Around 4,500 tonnes of East German coins were melted down at the Rackwitz metal works in 1990. According to the KfW, which became custodian of the stored currency in 1994, a total of approximately 3,000 tonnes of banknotes, savings passbooks and checks were transported by military convoy from the Staatsbank der DDR in Berlin to the Halberstadt tunnel facility between 1990 and 1991. The tunnels, originally built by forced labour during the Second World War and later used by the National People's Army, had been repurposed as storage for the currency pending a decision on its disposal. The KfW marked the 35th anniversary of the monetary union in 2025 by releasing photographs of the storage and destruction operation from its archive. Almost all the paper money (about 100 billion Marks, in 620 million banknotes with a volume of 4,500 m^{3} or 160,000 ft^{3}, about 300 boxcars), including all the currency collected at the time of the monetary union and the never-used East German M200 and M500 banknotes, was placed into storage in 1990 and 1991 in two 300-metre-long (980 ft) sandstone caverns in the Thekenberge near Halberstadt. In total, 3,000 tonnes of banknotes, passbooks, and checks were stored there, having been brought by military convoy from the Staatsbank der DDR in Berlin. The currency became the property of the Kreditanstalt für Wiederaufbau (KfW) in 1994 through its merger with the Staatsbank Berlin (the post-reunification name for the Staatsbank der DDR). The 13 km (8.1 mi) tunnel system had been built by forced labour during World War II, and used by the National People's Army under the code name "Malachit", or camp complex KL-12 NVA-Nr.16/630. It was the bunker with the largest floor space, and was used for the safeguarding of devices and munitions that would be needed for war. The money was protected from theft by two-metre-thick (6 1/2 ft) concrete walls and heavy steel doors. For cost reasons, the money was left to rot under the natural humidity, but it was further covered with gravel.

In July 2001, it was discovered that two Halberstadt residents (aged 24 and 26) had gained entry to the tunnel system through an unsecured opening and made off with numerous banknotes. The two residents were convicted of the crime and sentenced to four months in prison and three years of probation. Furthermore, they had to pay €120 (DM 234.70) to a non-profit organisation. The appearance among collectors of uncirculated M 200 and M 500 DDR notes, and of the never-issued military currency, is attributed to this theft. Because of the theft and the slowness of the rotting, the KfW then decided to burn the old currency. Between April and June 2002, 298 containers of the currency remains were burned in an incinerator (six containers per day) along with household refuse. The last container was burned on 25 June 2002.

== Coins ==
The first issue of Eastern coins was released in 1948, inscribed with "Deutschland", and consisted of aluminium 1 pfennig, 5 pfennig, and 10 pfennig denominations, depicting a wheat stalk atop a cogwheel, with aluminium-bronze 50 pfennig coins added in 1950, depicting a factory. The 1952 series of the smaller coins depict a compass and hammer, with two spikes of wheat behind it.

Starting with the 1 pfennig coin in 1960, followed by the 10 pfennig coin in 1963, and the 5 pfennig coin in 1968, the old style coins were gradually replaced with new coins depicting the state name "Deutsche Demokratische Republik". Aluminium 1 Mark, 2 Mark, and 50 pfennig pieces were released for circulation in 1956, 1957 and 1958, respectively. In 1969, brass 20 pfennig coins were introduced, with nickel-bronze (later cupro-nickel) 5 Mark coins issued from 1968. In 1973 and 1974, the 1 Mark and 2 Mark coins were redesigned dropping the former "Deutsche Mark" title. The brass 20 pfennig coins were issued because pay telephones had a standard charge of 20 pfennig, and were having problems with aluminium coins jamming due to their light weight. Commemorative 5 Mark, 10 Mark, and 20 Mark coins of various types have also occasionally made it into circulation. The aluminium content of the coins meant that East German coins were nicknamed "alu-chips".

For several months after the July 1990 adoption of the Deutsche Mark, low-value GDR coinage (up to 50 pfennig) continued to circulate in the former GDR as legal tender, because the Bundesbank could not deliver enough small coins quickly enough to replace the former GDR coins.

Official coins of the German Democratic Republic during the 1970s and 1980s
| Front | Back | Material | Weight | Size |
|---|---|---|---|---|
1pf
| | | Aluminium | 0.75 gram (0.026 ounce) | 17 millimeters (0.669 inch) |
5pf
| | | Aluminium | 1.10 gram (0.039 ounce) | 19 millimeters (0.748 inch) |
10pf
| | | Aluminium | 1.50 gram (0.053 ounce) | 21 millimeters (0.827 inch) |
20pf
| | | Brass | 5.4 grams (0.19 ounce) | 22.2 millimeters (0.874 inch) |
50pf
| | | Aluminium | 2.0 grams (0.071 ounce) | 23 millimeters (0.906 inch) |
M1
| | | Aluminium | 2.5 grams (0.088 ounce) | 25 millimeters (0.984 inch) |
M2
| | | Aluminium | 3.0 grams (0.106 ounce) | 27 millimeters (1.063 inches) |

=== Commemorative coins ===
Commemorative coins of the German Democratic Republic
| Front | Back | Material | Weight | Size |
|---|---|---|---|---|
M5; Commemorative Coin for the 20th Anniversary of the GDR
| | | Nickel-bronze | 9.7 grams (0.342 ounce) | 29 millimeters (1.142 inch) |
| | | Copper-nickel | 9.7 grams (0.342 ounce) | 29 millimeters (1.142 inch) |

There were 123 commemorative coins altogether, with face values of M5, M10 or M20. The coins were released for various anniversaries or special events. Silver, copper/nickel/zinc (German silver / nickel silver) or other alloys were used for the coins. A complete list of all released commemorative coins can be found in the "Liste der Gedenkmünzen der DDR". Some of the commemorative coins were produced in very large volumes, especially the one shown above. These coins entered circulation, because they had little or no additional value for collectors due to the large numbers issued.

== Banknotes ==
| Heading | Image | Size (mm) | Pick no. | Details |
|---|---|---|---|---|
| Reissue of pre-1948 banknotes | DM 1 (1948) | | | Old Rentenmark and Reichsmark notes then in circulation in the Soviet occupation zone had adhesive stamps affixed in June 1948 to extend their validity while new banknotes were being printed (see Currency reform above). These notes were issued in denominations of DM1, DM2, DM5, DM10, DM20, DM50 and DM100. Colloquially, these reissued banknotes were referred to as klebemark ("sticker marks") or kuponmark ("coupon marks"). |
| Series 1948 DM banknotes | DM 1 from the 1948 Eastern series | | | The reissued Reichsmark and Rentenmark banknotes with adhesive stamps were replaced by newly designed banknotes on 24 July 1948, in denominations of 50Dpf, DM 1, DM 2, DM 5, DM 10, DM 20, DM 50, DM 100, and DM 1,000 Deutsche Mark von der Deutschen Notenbank. |
| Series 1955 DM banknotes | DM 5 note from the 1955 (Eastern) series | | | A second issue of 1955 contained notes in denominations of DM5, DM10, DM20, DM50 and DM100 Deutsche Mark von der Deutschen Notenbank. |
| Series 1964 MDN banknotes | | | | In 1964, the government issued a new series of banknotes in denominations of MDN 5, MDN 10, MDN 20, MDN 50 and MDN 100 Mark der Deutschen Notenbank (MDN). Upon their issuance, the Series 1948 and 1955 banknotes were withdrawn from circulation. |
| Series 1971/1975 M banknotes | | | | The final series of East German banknotes carried issue dates of 1971 or 1975 and were issued in denominations of M5, M10, M20, M50 and M100 Mark der DDR. Upon their issuance, Series 1964 MDN banknotes were gradually withdrawn from circulation. The MDN5 banknote was the last to be withdrawn, in 1981. |
| M 5 note, Series 1975 | 5 Mark der DDR Banknote, 1975 | 112x50 | 27 | The violet M5 note depicts Thomas Müntzer, an early Reformation-era German pastor who was a rebel leader during the German Peasants' War. The reverse shows several harvesting machines, which was meant to highlight the importance of agriculture in the "Workers and Farmers State" (Arbeiter- und Bauernstaat). |
| M 10 note, Series 1971 | 10 Mark der DDR note, 1971 | 120x53 | 28 | The orange M10 note depicts Clara Zetkin, an early German Communist and women's rights advocate. The reverse shows a female engineer sitting at a control console inside the Rheinsberg Nuclear Power Plant, which began operation in 1966. |
| M 20 note, Series 1975 | 20 Mark der DDR note, 1975 | 127x55 | 29 | The green M20 note depicts author and philosopher Johann Wolfgang von Goethe. The reverse shows several young children exiting a school, meant to emphasize the importance of education in the GDR. |
| M 50 note, Series 1971 | 50 Mark der DDR Banknote, 1971. | 135x59 | 30 | The red M50 depicts Friedrich Engels, the co-founder of Marxist theory. The reverse shows an industrial complex like those in the PCK Raffinerie in Schwedt. The confusion of pipes and smokestacks in the chemical plants and power stations highlighted the importance of industry in the GDR. |
| M 100 note, Series 1975 | 100 Mark der DDR Banknote, 1975. | 143x61 | 31 | The highest valued and best known of the notes distributed by the Staatsbank der DDR was the M100 banknote. The blue coloured note depicts Karl Marx on the front, and the back displays the Palast der Republik as seen from the Unter den Linden boulevard in East Berlin. In the background, the Berlin TV tower, the red city hall (Rathaus), and the Zeughaus (Arsenal) can be seen. The combination of science, politics, business, and people was intended to honor the socialist system and to show the German Democratic Republic as a progressive and modern country. |
| M 200 note, Series 1985 | | 152x66 | 32 | The Staatsbank der DDR (State Bank of the GDR) had planned to issue M 200 and M 500 notes and printed them 1971 and in 1984 in preparation for issue, but never circulated them. Collectors hold a few examples. These notes did not have a personality on the obverse. The M200 note had on its front a family with two children in front of a modern GDR high-rise apartment building. The back pictured a schoolyard with eight children and a teacher. The watermark was a dove of peace. |
| M 500 notes, Series 1985 | 500 Mark der DDR note, 1985 (front) | 160x70 | 33 | The Staatsbank der DDR printed the M500 notes in 1984 in preparation for issue, but never circulated them. A few examples are held by collectors. On the M500 note, the front showed the coat-of-arms of the GDR (hammer and a compass in a wreath), while the back showed the State Council (Staatsrat) building of the GDR in Berlin. |

== East German military currency ==
In 1980, East Germany prepared special military banknotes intended to be used in international missions of the National People's Army (NVA), but they were never issued. These military notes consist of the 1955 series (DN B13 – DN B17) handstamped with the coat of arms and—in some cases—overprinted Musternote (Sample Note) or Militärgeld (Military Money). Preparations were made to introduce them in 1980, but this never occurred. Instead, in 1990 and 1991, these and other old and unissued East German notes and coins were stored in bunkers in massive sandstone caverns in the Thekenberge near Halberstadt. However, a pair of local citizens gained entry to this cache over the next decade and stole some of its contents, including the unissued military notes dated 1955, as well as two unissued notes dated 1985. In response to this theft, the remaining paper money was incinerated between April and 25 June 2002. Only a few genuine military banknotes exist; however, an abundance of 1955 series banknotes survived, as did the coat of arms handstamp. Many military banknotes have since been fabricated and it's impossible to distinguish them from genuine notes.

== See also ==
- Heinrich Rau
- Economy of East Germany

| Preceded by: Reichsmark, Rentenmark; Reason: reaction to the changeover in Trizone (later West Germany); Ratio: M 1 = 7 (either) ℛℳ on the first 70 ℛℳ for private individuals, otherwise M 1 = 10 ℛℳ | Currency of East Germany; 24 June 1948 – 30 June 1990 | Succeeded by: Deutsche Mark; Reason: German reunification Ratio: at par up to M 4,000, M 2 = DM 1 above M 4,000 |
