= List of central banks =

This is a list of central banks.

== Central banks by alphabetical order ==
This is a list of central banks. Countries that are only partially recognized internationally are marked with an asterisk (*).

Country name	Currency	Central bank name	Native name	Establishment
Abkhazia*	Abkhazian apsar	National Bank of the Republic of Abkhazia	Аԥсны Аҳәынҭқарра Амилаҭтә Банк / Национальный банк Республики Абхазия	1991
Afghanistan	Afghan afghani	Da Afghanistan Bank	بانک مرکزی افغانستان / د افغانستان بانک	1939
Albania	Albanian lek	Bank of Albania	Banka e Shqipërisë	1925
Algeria	Algerian dinar	Bank of Algeria	بنك الجزائر / Banque d'Algérie	1962
Andorra	Euro	No central bank; uses the Euro as its domestic currency. The Andorran Financial Authority provides financial regulation and control of the financial sector in Andorra.		
Angola	Angolan kwanza	National Bank of Angola	Banco Nacional de Angola	1926
Anguilla	Eastern Caribbean dollar	Eastern Caribbean Central Bank		1983
Antigua and Barbuda	Eastern Caribbean dollar	Eastern Caribbean Central Bank		1983
Argentina	Argentine peso	Central Bank of Argentina	Banco Central de la República Argentina	1935
Armenia	Armenian dram	Central Bank of Armenia	Հայաստանի Կենտրոնական Բանկ	1991
Aruba	Aruban florin	Central Bank of Aruba	Centrale Bank van Aruba / Banco Central di Aruba	1986
Australia	Australian dollar	Reserve Bank of Australia		1960
Austria	Euro	European Central Bank (Oesterreichische Nationalbank)	Oesterreichische Nationalbank	1816
Azerbaijan	Azerbaijani manat	Central Bank of Azerbaijan	Azərbaycan Mərkəzi Bankı	1992
Bahamas	Bahamian dollar	Central Bank of The Bahamas		1974
Bahrain	Bahraini dinar	Central Bank of Bahrain	مصرف البحرين المركزي	1973
Bangladesh	Bangladeshi taka	Bangladesh Bank	বাংলাদেশ ব্যাংক	1971
Barbados	Barbadian dollar	Central Bank of Barbados		1972
Belarus	Belarusian ruble	National Bank of the Republic of Belarus	Нацыянальны банк Рэспублікі Беларусь / Национальный банк Республики Беларусь	1992
Belgium	Euro	European Central Bank (National Bank of Belgium)	Nationale Bank van België / Banque nationale de Belgique / Belgische Nationalbank	1850
Belize	Belize dollar	Central Bank of Belize		1982
Benin	West African CFA franc	Central Bank of West African States	Banque Centrale des États de l'Afrique de l'Ouest	1959
Bermuda	Bermudan dollar	Bermuda Monetary Authority		1969
Bhutan	Bhutanese ngultrum	Royal Monetary Authority of Bhutan	བྲུག་རྒྱལ་གཞུང་དངུལ་ལས་དབང་འཛིན་	1982
Bolivia	Bolivian boliviano	Central Bank of Bolivia	Banco Central de Bolivia	1928
Bosnia and Herzegovina	Bosnia and Herzegovina convertible mark	Central Bank of Bosnia and Herzegovina	Centralna Banka Bosne i Hercegovine / Централна банка Босне и Херцеговине	1997
Botswana	Botswana pula	Bank of Botswana	Banka ya Botswana	1975
Brazil	Brazilian real	Central Bank of Brazil	Banco Central do Brasil	1964
Brunei	Brunei dollar	Brunei Darussalam Central Bank	Bank Pusat Brunei Darussalam	2011
Bulgaria	Euro	European Central Bank (Bulgarian National Bank)	Българска народна банка	1879
Burkina Faso	West African CFA franc	Central Bank of West African States	Banque Centrale des États de l'Afrique de l'Ouest	1959
Burundi	Burundian franc	Bank of the Republic of Burundi	Banque de la République du Burundi / Ibanki ya Republika y'UBurundi	1966
Cambodia	Cambodian riel	National Bank of Cambodia	ធនាគារជាតិ នៃ កម្ពុជា	1954
Cameroon	Central African CFA franc	Bank of Central African States	Banque des États de l'Afrique Centrale	1972
Canada	Canadian dollar	Bank of Canada	Banque du Canada	1935
Cape Verde	Cape Verdean escudo	Bank of Cape Verde	Banco de Cabo Verde	1975
Cayman Islands	Cayman Islands dollar	Cayman Islands Monetary Authority		1997
Central African Republic	Central African CFA franc	Bank of Central African States	Banque des États de l'Afrique Centrale	1972
Chad	Central African CFA franc	Bank of Central African States	Banque des États de l'Afrique Centrale / البنك المركزي لدول وسط إفريقيا	1972
Chile	Chilean peso	Central Bank of Chile	Banco Central de Chile	1925
China	Renminbi	People's Bank of China	中国人民銀行	1948
Colombia	Colombian peso	Bank of the Republic	Banco de la República	1923
Comoros	Comorian franc	Central Bank of the Comoros	Banque Centrale des Comores / البنك المركزي لجزر القمر	1981
Congo, Democratic Republic of	Congolese franc	Central Bank of the Congo	Banque Centrale du Congo	1964
Congo, Republic of	Central African CFA franc	Bank of Central African States	Banque des États de l'Afrique Centrale	1972
Costa Rica	Costa Rican colón	Central Bank of Costa Rica	Banco Central de Costa Rica	1950
Cote d'Ivoire	West African CFA franc	Central Bank of West African States	Banque Centrale des États de l'Afrique de l'Ouest	1959
Croatia	Euro	European Central Bank (Croatian National Bank)	Hrvatska narodna banka	1990
Cuba	Cuban peso	Central Bank of Cuba	Banco Central de Cuba	1948
Curaçao	Netherlands Antillean guilder	Central Bank of Curaçao and Sint Maarten	Centrale Bank van Curaçao en Sint Maarten	1828
Cyprus	Euro	European Central Bank (Central Bank of Cyprus)	Κεντρική Τράπεζα της Κύπρου / Kıbrıs Merkez Bankası	1963
Turkish Republic of Northern Cyprus*	Turkish lira	Central Bank of the Turkish Republic of Northern Cyprus	Kuzey Kıbrıs Türk Cumhuriyeti Merkez Bankası	1983
Czech Republic	Czech koruna	Czech National Bank	Česká národní banka	1993
Denmark	Danish krone	Danmarks Nationalbank		1818
Djibouti	Djiboutian franc	Central Bank of Djibouti	Banque Centrale de Djibouti / البنك المركزي الجيبوتي	1979
Dominica	Eastern Caribbean dollar	Eastern Caribbean Central Bank		1983
Dominican Republic	Dominican peso	Central Bank of the Dominican Republic	Banco Central de la República Dominicana	1947
Ecuador	United States dollar	Central Bank of Ecuador	Banco Central del Ecuador	1927
Egypt	Egyptian pound	Central Bank of Egypt	البنك المركزي المصري	1961
El Salvador	United States dollar	Central Reserve Bank of El Salvador	Banco Central de Reserva de El Salvador	1934
Equatorial Guinea	Central African CFA franc	Bank of Central African States	Banco de los Estados de África Central / Banque des États de l'Afrique Centrale / Banco dos Estados da África Central	1972
Eritrea	Eritrean nakfa	Bank of Eritrea	ባንክ ኤርትረ	1993
Estonia	Euro	European Central Bank (Bank of Estonia)	Eesti Pank	1990
Eswatini	Swazi lilangeni	Central Bank of Eswatini	Umntsholi Wemaswati	1974
Ethiopia	Ethiopian birr	National Bank of Ethiopia	የኢትዮጵያ ብሔራዊ ባንክ	1963
Faroe Islands	Faroese króna	Danmarks Nationalbank	Danmarkar Tjóðarbanki	1818
Fiji	Fijian dollar	Reserve Bank of Fiji	Maroroi Baqe ni Viti	1984
Finland	Euro	European Central Bank (Bank of Finland)	Suomen Pankki / Finlands Bank	1812
France	Euro	European Central Bank (Bank of France)	Banque de France	1800
Gabon	Central African CFA franc	Bank of Central African States	Banque des États de l'Afrique Centrale	1972
The Gambia	Gambian dalasi	Central Bank of The Gambia		1971
Germany	Euro	European Central Bank (Deutsche Bundesbank)		1957
Georgia	Georgian lari	National Bank of Georgia	საქართველოს ეროვნული ბანკი	1991
Ghana	Ghanaian cedi	Bank of Ghana		1957
Greece	Euro	European Central Bank (Bank of Greece)	Τράπεζα της Ελλάδος	1928
Grenada	Eastern Caribbean dollar	Eastern Caribbean Central Bank		1983
Greenland	Danish krone	Danmarks Nationalbank	Naalagaaffiup Aningaaseriviutaa	1818
Guatemala	Guatemalan quetzal	Bank of Guatemala	Banco de Guatemala	1945
Guinea	Guinean franc	Central Bank of the Republic of Guinea	Banque Centrale de la République de Guinée	1960
Guinea-Bissau	West African CFA franc	Central Bank of West African States	Banco Central dos Estados da África Ocidental	1959
Guyana	Guyanese dollar	Bank of Guyana		1965
Haiti	Haitian gourde	Bank of the Republic of Haiti	Banque de la République d'Haïti / Bank Repiblik Ayiti	1979
Hong Kong	Hong Kong dollar	Hong Kong Monetary Authority	香港金融管理局	1993
Honduras	Honduran lempira	Central Bank of Honduras	Banco Central de Honduras	1950
Hungary	Hungarian forint	Hungarian National Bank	Magyar Nemzeti Bank	1924
Iceland	Icelandic króna	Central Bank of Iceland	Seðlabanki Íslands	1961
India	Indian rupee	Reserve Bank of India	భారతీయ రిజర్వ్ బ్యాంక్	1935
Indonesia	Indonesian rupiah	Bank Indonesia		1953
Iran	Iranian rial	Central Bank of the Islamic Republic of Iran	بانک مرکزی ایران	1960
Iraq	Iraqi dinar	Central Bank of Iraq	البنك المركزي العراقي / بانکی ناوەندی عێراق	1947
Ireland	Euro	European Central Bank (Central Bank of Ireland)	Banc Ceannais na hÉireann	1943
Israel	Israeli new shekel	Bank of Israel	בנק ישראל / بنك إسرائيل	1954
Italy	Euro	European Central Bank (Bank of Italy)	Banca d'Italia	1893
Jamaica	Jamaican dollar	Bank of Jamaica		1961
Japan	Japanese yen	Bank of Japan	日本銀行	1882
Jordan	Jordanian dinar	Central Bank of Jordan	البنك المركزي الاردني	1964
Kazakhstan	Kazakhstani tenge	National Bank of Kazakhstan	Қазақстан Ұлттық Банкі / Qazaqstan Ūlttyq Bankı / Национальный банк Казахстана	1993
Kenya	Kenyan shilling	Central Bank of Kenya	Benki Kuu ya Kenya	1966
Kiribati	Kiribati dollar	No central bank; uses the Australian dollar as its domestic currency		
Korea, Democratic People's Republic of	North Korean won	Central Bank of the Democratic People's Republic of Korea	조선민주주의인민공화국중앙은행	1947
Korea, Republic of	South Korean won	Bank of Korea	한국은행	1950
Kosovo*	Euro	Central Bank of Kosovo	Banka Qendrore e Republikës së Kosovës / Centralna banka Republike Kosova / Централна банка Републике Косова	2008
Kuwait	Kuwaiti dinar	Central Bank of Kuwait	بنك الكويت المركزي	1969
Kyrgyzstan	Kyrgyzstani som	National Bank of the Kyrgyz Republic	Кыргыз Республикасынын Улуттук банкы / Национальный банк Кыргызской Республики	1991
Laos	Lao kip	Bank of the Lao People's Democratic Republic	ທະນາຄານ ແຫ່ງ ສ. ປ. ປ. ລາວ	1968
Latvia	Euro	European Central Bank (Bank of Latvia)	Latvijas Banka	1991
Lebanon	Lebanese pound	Banque du Liban	مصرف لبنان	1963
Lesotho	Lesotho loti	Central Bank of Lesotho	Banka e Kholo ea Lesotho	1978
Liberia	Liberian dollar	Central Bank of Liberia		2000
Libya	Libyan dinar	Central Bank of Libya	مصرف ليبيا المركزي	1956
Lithuania	Euro	European Central Bank (Bank of Lithuania)	Lietuvos Bankas	1990
Luxembourg	Euro	European Central Bank (Central Bank of Luxembourg)	Banque centrale du Luxembourg / Luxemburger Zentralbank / Zentralbank vu Lëtzebuerg	1998
Macau	Macanese pataca	Monetary Authority of Macao	澳門金融管理局; Autoridade Monetária de Macau	1999
Madagascar	Malagasy ariary	Central Bank of Madagascar	Banque Centrale de Madagascar / Banky Foiben'i Madagasikara	1974
Malawi	Malawian kwacha	Reserve Bank of Malawi		1964
Malaysia	Malaysian ringgit	Central Bank of Malaysia	Bank Negara Malaysia	1959
Maldives	Maldivian rufiyaa	Maldives Monetary Authority		1981
Mali	West African CFA franc	Central Bank of West African States	Banque Centrale des États de l'Afrique de l'Ouest	1959
Malta	Euro	European Central Bank (Central Bank of Malta)	Bank Ċentrali ta’ Malta	1968
Marshall Islands	United States dollar	No central bank; uses the United States dollar as its domestic currency		
Mauritania	Mauritanian ouguiya	Central Bank of Mauritania	Banque Centrale de Mauritanie / البنك المركزي الموريتاني	1973
Mauritius	Mauritian rupee	Bank of Mauritius	Banque de Maurice	1967
Mexico	Mexican peso	Bank of Mexico	Banco de México	1925
Micronesia	United States dollar	No central bank; uses the United States dollar as its domestic currency		
Moldova	Moldovan leu	National Bank of Moldova	Banca Națională a Moldovei	1991
Monaco	Euro	No central bank; uses the Euro as its domestic currency		
Mongolia	Mongolian tögrög	Bank of Mongolia	Монголбанк	1924
Montenegro	Euro	Central Bank of Montenegro	Centralna Banka Crne Gore / Централна Банка Црне Горе	2001
Montserrat	Eastern Caribbean dollar	Eastern Caribbean Central Bank		1983
Morocco	Moroccan dirham	Bank Al-Maghrib	بنك المغرب	1959
Mozambique	Mozambican metical	Bank of Mozambique	Banco de Moçambique	1975
Myanmar	Burmese kyat	Central Bank of Myanmar	မြန်မာနိုင်ငံတော်ဗဟိုဘဏ်	1948
Namibia	Namibian dollar	Bank of Namibia		1990
Nauru	Australian dollar	No central bank; uses the Australian dollar as its domestic currency		
Nepal	Nepalese rupee	Nepal Rastra Bank	नेपाल राष्ट्र बैंक	1956
Netherlands	Euro	European Central Bank (De Nederlandsche Bank)		1814
New Caledonia	CFP franc	Overseas Issuing Institute as part of the CFP	Institut d'émission d'outre-mer	1966
New Zealand	New Zealand dollar	Reserve Bank of New Zealand	Te Pūtea Matua	1934
Nicaragua	Nicaraguan córdoba	Central Bank of Nicaragua	Banco Central de Nicaragua	1960
Niger	West African CFA franc	Central Bank of West African States	Banque Centrale des États de l'Afrique de l'Ouest	1959
Nigeria	Nigerian naira	Central Bank of Nigeria	Babban Bankin Najeriya / Ilé Ìfowópamọ́-àgbà tí Nàìjíríà	1958
North Macedonia	Macedonian denar	National Bank of North Macedonia	Народна банка на Република Северна Македонија / Banka Kombëtare e Republikës së Maqedonisë së Veriut	1991
Norway	Norwegian krone	Norges Bank	Noregs Bank / Norgga Báŋku	1816
Oman	Omani rial	Central Bank of Oman	البنك المركزي العماني	1974
Pakistan	Pakistani rupee	State Bank of Pakistan	بینک دولت پاکستان	1948
Palau	United States dollar	No central bank; uses the United States dollar as its domestic currency		
Palestine*		Palestine Monetary Authority	سلطة النقد الفلسطينية	1994
Panama	United States dollar	No central bank; uses the United States dollar as its domestic currency, and the Panamanian balboa pegged to the U.S. dollar		
Papua New Guinea	Papua New Guinean kina	Bank of Papua New Guinea	Beng bilong Papua Niugini	1973
Paraguay	Paraguayan guaraní	Central Bank of Paraguay	Banco Central del Paraguay	1952
Peru	Peruvian sol	Central Reserve Bank of Peru	Banco Central de Reserva del Perú	1922
Philippines	Philippine peso	Bangko Sentral ng Pilipinas		1949
Poland	Polish złoty	National Bank of Poland	Narodowy Bank Polski	1945
French Polynesia	CFP franc	Overseas Issuing Institute	Institut d'émission d'outre-mer	1966
Portugal	Euro	European Central Bank (Bank of Portugal)	Banco de Portugal	1846
Qatar	Qatari riyal	Qatar Central Bank	مصرف قطر المركزي	1973
Romania	Romanian leu	National Bank of Romania	Banca Națională a României	1880
Russia	Russian ruble	Central Bank of Russia	Центральный банк Российской Федерации	1990
Rwanda	Rwandan franc	National Bank of Rwanda	Banque Nationale du Rwanda / Banki Nkuru y'u Rwanda	1964
Saint Kitts and Nevis	Eastern Caribbean dollar	Eastern Caribbean Central Bank		1983
Saint Lucia	Eastern Caribbean dollar	Eastern Caribbean Central Bank		1983
Saint Vincent and the Grenadines	Eastern Caribbean dollar	Eastern Caribbean Central Bank		1983
Samoa	Samoan tālā	Central Bank of Samoa	Faletupe Tutotonu o Sāmoa	1984
San Marino	Euro	Central Bank of the Republic of San Marino	Banca Centrale della Repubblica di San Marino	2005
São Tomé and Príncipe	São Tomé and Príncipe dobra	Central Bank of São Tomé and Príncipe	Banco Central de São Tomé e Príncipe	1975
Saudi Arabia	Saudi riyal	Saudi Central Bank	البنك المركزي السعودي	1952
Senegal	West African CFA franc	Central Bank of West African States	Banque Centrale des États de l'Afrique de l'Ouest	1959
Serbia	Serbian dinar	National Bank of Serbia	Народна банка Србије / Narodna banka Srbije	1884
Seychelles	Seychellois rupee	Central Bank of Seychelles	Banque centrale des Seychelles / Labank santral Sesel	1983
Sierra Leone	Sierra Leonean leone	Bank of Sierra Leone		1963
Singapore	Singapore dollar	Monetary Authority of Singapore	新加坡金融管理局 / Penguasa Kewangan Singapura / சிங்கப்பூர் நாணய ஆணையம்	1971
Sint Maarten	Netherlands Antillean guilder	Central Bank of Curaçao and Sint Maarten	Centrale Bank van Curaçao en Sint Maarten	1828
Slovakia	Euro	European Central Bank (National Bank of Slovakia)	Národná banka Slovenska	1993
Slovenia	Euro	European Central Bank (Bank of Slovenia)	Banka Slovenije	1991
Solomon Islands	Solomon Islands dollar	Central Bank of Solomon Islands		1983
Somalia	Somali shilling	Central Bank of Somalia	Bankiga Dhexe ee Soomaaliya / البنك المركزي الصومالي	1960
Somaliland*	Somaliland shilling	Bank of Somaliland	Baanka Somaliland / البنك المركزي صوماليلاند	1994
South Africa	South African rand	South African Reserve Bank	iBhange-ngodla laseNingizimu Afrika / iBhanki enguVimba yoMzantsi Afrika / Suid-Afrikaanse Reserwebank	1921
South Ossetia*		National Bank of the Republic of South Ossetia	Респуликӕ Хуссар Ирыстоны Националон банк / Национальный банк Республики Южная Осетия	2013
South Sudan	South Sudanese pound	Bank of South Sudan		2011
Spain	Euro	European Central Bank (Bank of Spain)	Banco de España	1782
Sri Lanka	Sri Lankan rupee	Central Bank of Sri Lanka	ශ්‍රී ලංකා මහ බැංකුව / இலங்கை மத்திய வங்கி	1950
Sudan	Sudanese pound	Central Bank of Sudan	بنك السودان المركزي	1960
Suriname	Surinamese dollar	Central Bank of Suriname	Centrale Bank van Suriname	1957
Sweden	Swedish krona	Sveriges Riksbank		1668
Switzerland	Swiss franc	Swiss National Bank	Schweizerische Nationalbank / Banque nationale suisse / Banca nazionale svizzera / Banca naziunala svizra	1906
Syria	Syrian pound	Central Bank of Syria	مصرف سورية المركزي	1953
Taiwan*	New Taiwan dollar	Central Bank of the Republic of China (Taiwan)	中華民國中央銀行	1961
Tajikistan	Tajikistani somoni	National Bank of Tajikistan	Бонки миллии Тоҷикистон / Национальный банк Таджикистана	1991
Tanzania	Tanzanian shilling	Bank of Tanzania	Benki Kuu ya Tanzania	1965
Thailand	Thai baht	Bank of Thailand	ธนาคารแห่งประเทศไทย	1942
Timor-Leste	United States dollar	Timor-Leste Central Bank	Banco Central de Timor-Leste / Banku Sentrál Timór Lorosa'e	2011
Togo	West African CFA franc	Central Bank of West African States	Banque Centrale des États de l'Afrique de l'Ouest	1959
Tonga	Tongan paʻanga	National Reserve Bank of Tonga	Pangikē Pule Fakafonua ʻo Tonga	1989
Transnistria*		Transnistrian Republican Bank	Банка Републиканэ Нистрянэ / Приднестровский Республиканский Банк / Придністровський Республіканський Банк	1992
Trinidad and Tobago	Trinidad and Tobago dollar	Central Bank of Trinidad and Tobago		1964
Tunisia	Tunisian dinar	Central Bank of Tunisia	البنك المركزي التونسي / Banque Centrale de Tunisie	1958
Turkey	Turkish lira	Central Bank of the Republic of Turkey	Türkiye Cumhuriyet Merkez Bankası	1930
Turkmenistan	Turkmen manat	Central Bank of Turkmenistan	Türkmenistanyň Merkezi Banky	1991
Tuvalu	Tuvaluan dollar	No central bank; uses the Australian dollar as its domestic currency, and the Tuvaluan dollar pegged to the Australian dollar		
Uganda	Ugandan shilling	Bank of Uganda	Benki Kuu ya Uganda	1966
Ukraine	Hryvnia	National Bank of Ukraine	Національний банк України	1991
United Arab Emirates	Emirati dirham	Central Bank of the United Arab Emirates	مصرف الإمارات العربية المتحدة المركزي	1980
United Kingdom	Sterling	Bank of England		1694
United States	United States dollar	Federal Reserve		1913
Uruguay	Uruguayan peso	Central Bank of Uruguay	Banco Central del Uruguay	1967
Uzbekistan	Uzbekistani soum	Central Bank of the Republic of Uzbekistan	O‘zbekiston Respublikasi Markaziy Banki / Ўзбекистон Республикаси Марказий Банки	1991
Vanuatu	Vanuatu vatu	Reserve Bank of Vanuatu	Reserve Bank blong Vanuatu	1981
Vatican City	Euro	Administration of the Patrimony of the Apostolic See	Amministrazione del Patrimonio della Sede Apostolica / Administratio Patrimonii Sedis Apostolicae	1967
Venezuela	Venezuelan bolívar	Central Bank of Venezuela	Banco Central de Venezuela	1939
Vietnam	Vietnamese đồng	State Bank of Vietnam	Ngân hàng nhà nước Việt Nam	1951
Wallis and Futuna	CFP franc	Overseas Issuing Institute as part of the CFP	Institut d'émission d'outre-mer	1966
Yemen	Yemeni rial	Central Bank of Yemen	البنك المركزي اليمني	1971
Zambia	Zambian kwacha	Bank of Zambia		1964
Zimbabwe	Zimbabwean ZiG, United States dollar	Reserve Bank of Zimbabwe		1964

== Major central banks by currency allocation percentage of worldwide foreign exchange reserves ==
Source: World Currency Composition of Official Foreign Exchange Reserves, International Monetary Fund

Country name	Central bank name	Currency	Currency share percentage of global allocated reserves in Q4 2022 (%)	Central bank governor	Native name of central bank	Established
United States	Federal Reserve	United States dollar	58.36	Kevin Warsh		1913
European Union	European Central Bank	Euro	20.47	Christine Lagarde		1998
Japan	Bank of Japan	Japanese yen	5.51	Kazuo Ueda	日本銀行 / Nippon Ginkō	1882
United Kingdom	Bank of England	Pound sterling	4.95	Andrew Bailey		1694
China	People's Bank of China	Renminbi	2.69	Pan Gongsheng	中国人民銀行 / Zhōngguó Rénmín Yínháng	1948
Canada	Bank of Canada	Canadian dollar	2.38	Tiff Macklem	Banque du Canada	1935
Australia	Reserve Bank of Australia	Australian dollar	1.96	Michele Bullock		1960
Switzerland	Swiss National Bank	Swiss franc	0.23	Thomas Jordan	Schweizerische Nationalbank / Banque Nationale Suisse / Banca Nazionale Svizzera / Banca Naziunala Svizra	1906

== Former central banking jurisdictions ==
- City of Amsterdam – Bank of Amsterdam (1609–1791)
- City of Barcelona – Taula de canvi de Barcelona (1401–1714)
- British East Africa – East African Currency Board (1919–1966)
- Independent State of Croatia – Croatian State Bank (Hrvatska Državna Banka, 1941–1945)
- Czechoslovakia – National Bank of Czechoslovakia (1926–1939 and 1945–1950) and State Bank of Czechoslovakia (1950–1992)
- Free City of Frankfurt – Frankfurter Bank (1854–1875)
- Republic of Genoa – Bank of Saint George (1407–1805)
- German Democratic Republic – Deutsche Notenbank (1948–1968) and Staatsbank der DDR (1968–1990)
- Free and Hanseatic City of Hamburg – Hamburger Bank (1619–1875)
- Korea under Japanese and American rule – Bank of Chōsen (1909–1950)
- Manchukuo – Central Bank of Manchou (1932–1945)
- General Government – Bank of Issue in Poland (1940–1945)
- Kingdom of Prussia – Prussian Royal Bank (1765–1846) and Bank of Prussia (1847–1875)
- Kingdom of Sardinia – Banca Nazionale negli Stati Sardi (1849–1861), itself formed through the merger of Banca di Genova (1846–1849) and Banca di Torino (1847–1849)
- South Vietnam – National Bank of Vietnam (1954–1975)
- Kingdom of the Two Sicilies – Banco di Napoli, under different names from 1463 to final end of central banking role in 1926
- Grand Duchy of Tuscany – Banca di Firenze (1816–1893), renamed National Tuscan Bank from 1857
- USSR – People's Bank (1917–1922) and Gosbank (1922–1991)
- Republic of Venice – Banco del Giro (1524–1806)
- Yugoslavia – National Bank of the Kingdom of Serbs, Croats and Slovenes (1920–1929), National Bank of the Kingdom of Yugoslavia (1929–1941), and National Bank of Yugoslavia (1946–1991)
- FR Yugoslavia – National Bank of Yugoslavia in Serbia and Montenegro (1992–2003)

== See also ==
- Central banks and currencies of Africa
- Central banks and currencies of the Caribbean
- Central banks and currencies of Central America and South America
- Central banks and currencies of Europe
- List of currencies
- List of financial supervisory authorities by country
- Bank for International Settlements – an international organisation which fosters international monetary and financial cooperation and serves as a bank for central banks.
