= New Caledonian franc =

Currency of New Caledonia

The franc is the currency of New Caledonia and Wallis and Futuna, part of the CFP franc since 1945 and issued by the Institut d'émission d'outre-mer (IEOM) in Paris. It is subdivided into 100 centimes, although centime denominations are no longer in circulation.

== History ==
Until 1873, the French franc circulated in New Caledonia. That year banknotes were issued specifically for use on the island which circulated along with French coins. In 1945, the CFP franc was introduced, with coins issued for New Caledonia from 1949. The CFP franc is also issued in French Polynesia, and was used in the New Hebrides until 1982 after its 1980 re-establishment as the Republic of Vanuatu. Since 1985, CFP franc banknotes have been issued common to both French Polynesia and New Caledonia. Separate coinages continued until 2023, when they were replaced with a single common set of CFP franc coins.

== Coins ==
In 1949, aluminium coins in 50 centime, 1 and 2 franc denominations were introduced, followed by an aluminium 5 franc coin in 1952. The 50 centime coin was only issued in 1949. In 1967, nickel 10, 20 and 50 franc coins were introduced, followed by a nickel-bronze 100 franc coin in 1976.

The overall design of the New Caledonia coins did not change from their introduction until their withdrawal in 2023. The obverse was identical to that of the French Polynesian coins. The only changes were the removal of the text Union Française after 1952 on the reverse, and the addition of the issuer initials "I.E.O.M" (Institut d'émission d'outre-mer) to the obverse in 1972.

Coins of New Caledonia, 1947–2022
Image		Value	Technical parameters				Description			Common name
Obverse	Reverse	Value	Diameter	Thickness	Mass	Composition	Edge	Obverse	Reverse	Common name
		F 1	23 mm		1.3g	aluminium alloy	Plain	Minerva	Kagu bird	F 1
		F 2	27 mm		2.2g	aluminium alloy	Plain	Minerva	Kagu bird	F 2
		F 5	31 mm		3.5g	aluminium alloy	Plain	Minerva	Kagu bird	F 5
		F 10	24 mm		6g	100% nickel, cupronickel after 2005	Milled	Marianne	Seascape with canoe	F 10
		F 20	28.5 mm		10g	100% nickel, cupronickel after 2005	Milled	Marianne	Zebu	F 20
		F 50	33 mm		15g	100% nickel, cupronickel after 2005	Milled	Marianne	Kanak hut with Cook pine and palm	F 50
		F 100	30 mm		10g	cupronickel-aluminium	Milled	Marianne	Kanak hut with Cook pine and palm	F 100
These images are to scale at 2.5 pixels per millimetre. For table standards, see the coin specification table. Source: Numista. See CFP franc for the currently circulating coin series.

The 1, 2 and 5 francs all feature the national bird, the kagu. The 10 francs features a boat of the indigenous tribes. The 20 francs features the heads of three zebu cattle facing left. The 50 and 100 francs feature the same design, a Kanak hut surrounded with Cook pines and a palm tree.

In September 2021 the IEOM issued a single set of smaller CFP franc coins common to all French Pacific Territories, to replace the two sets of coins used separately for New Caledonia and French Polynesia. The 1 and 2 franc coins were discontinued, and a new bimetallic 200 franc coin was issued. The old coins were withdrawn from circulation in January 2023.

== Banknotes ==
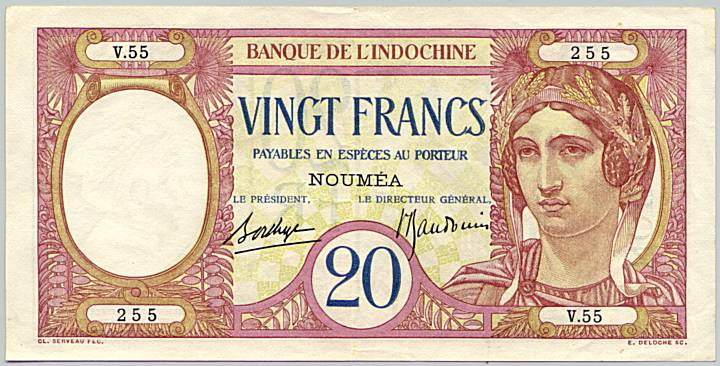
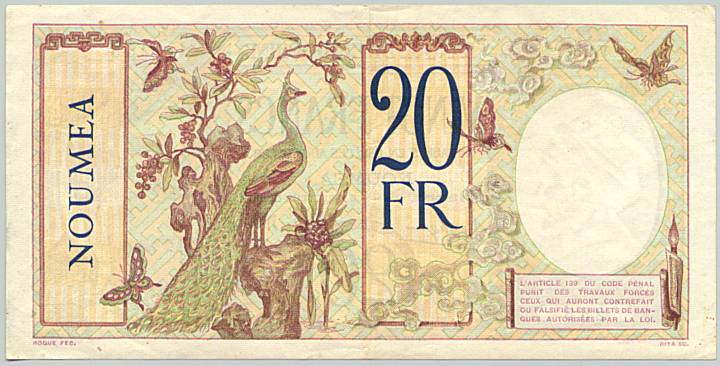
New Caledonian 20 franc note, issued 1929 by Banque de l'Indo-Chine (obverse, left; reverse, right).

Between 1873 and 1878, the Compagnie de la Nouvelle Calédonie introduced 5 and 20 franc notes. These were followed in 1875 by notes of the Banque de la Nouvelle Calédonie in denominations of 5, 20, 100 and 500 francs. From the 1890s, the Banque de l'Indochine issued banknotes from Nouméa in denominations of 5, 20, 100 and 500 francs.

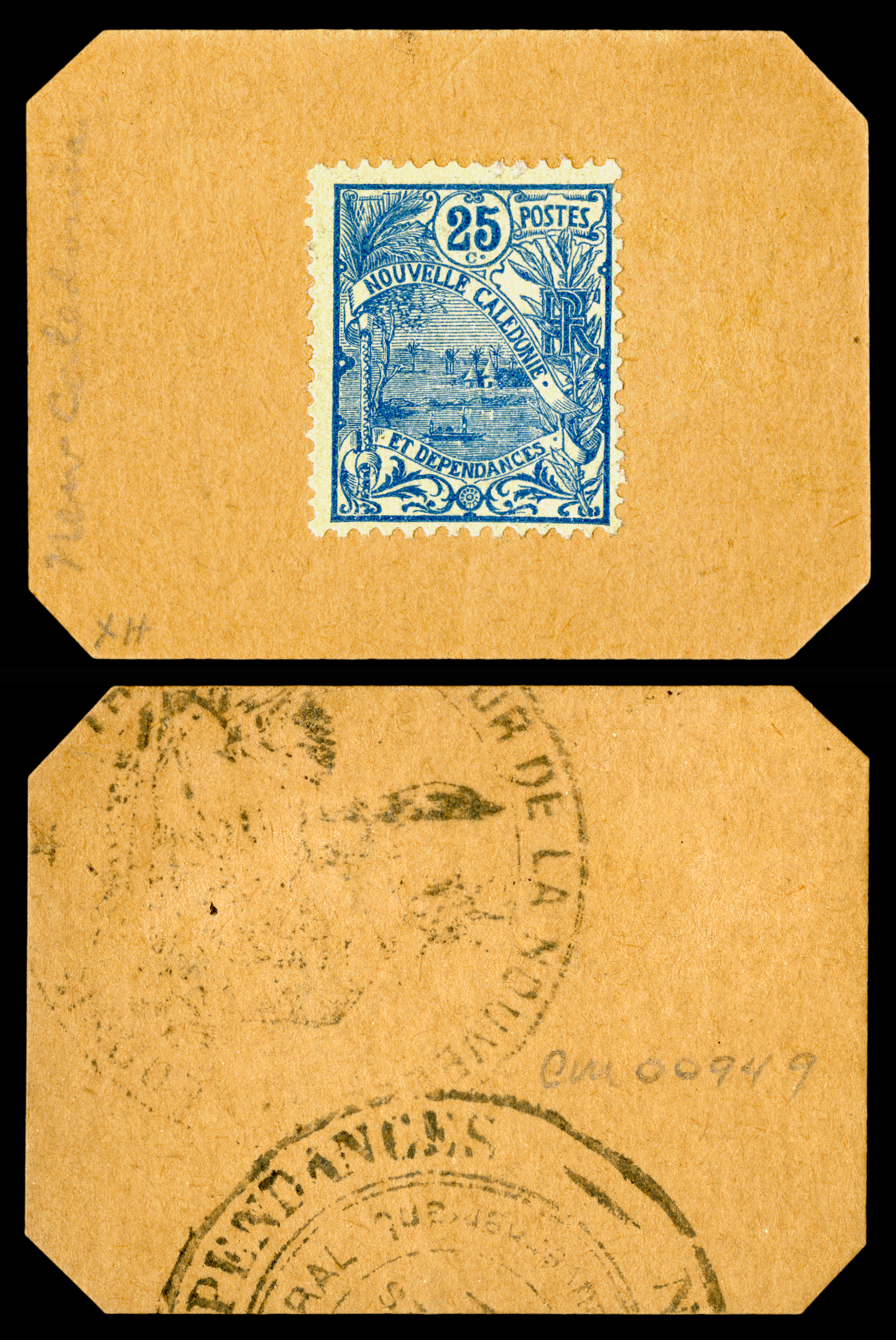
New Caledonia emergency stamp currency, 25 centimes (on card, 1914-23)

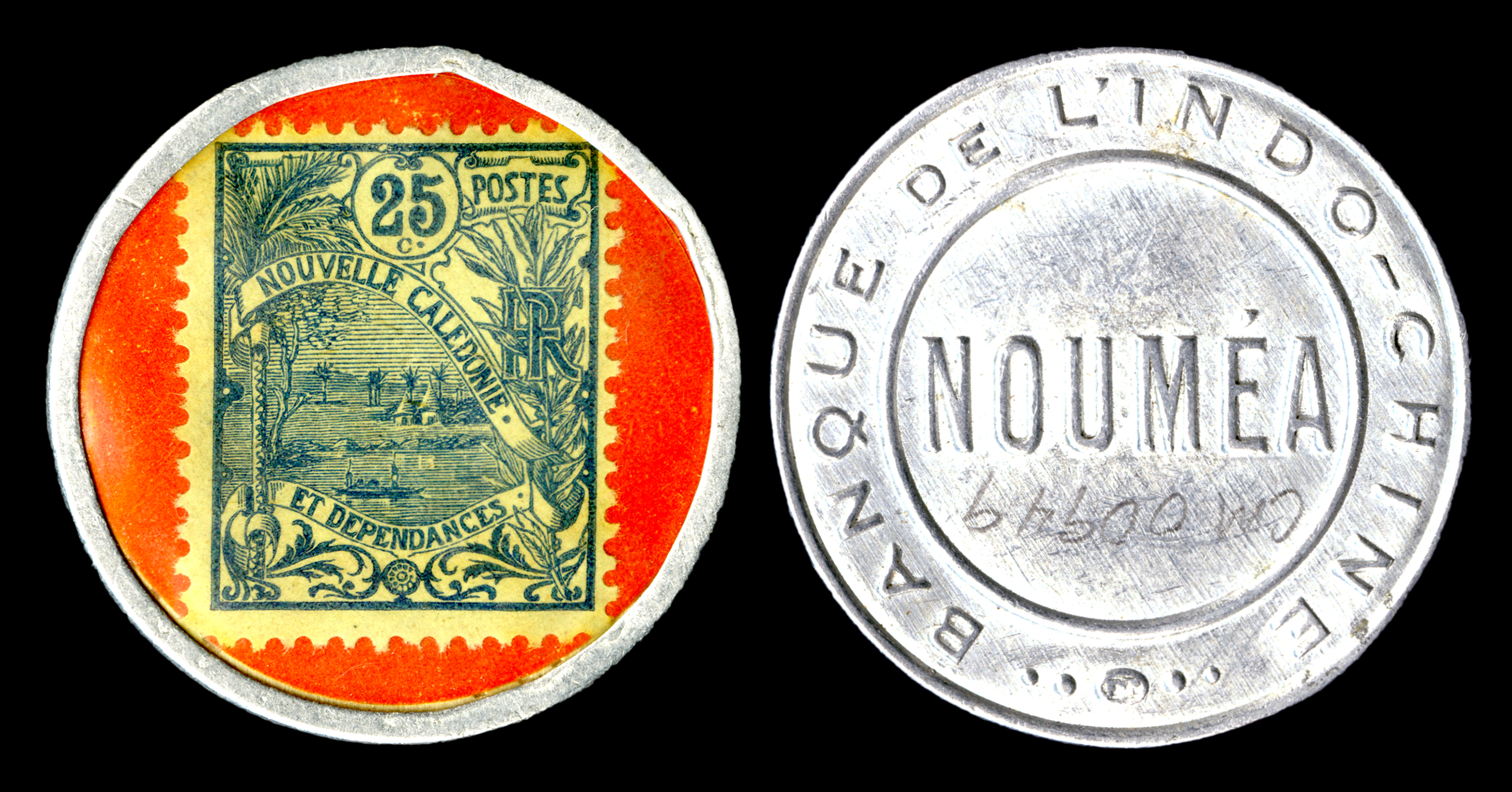
New Caledonia emergency stamp currency, 25 centimes (encapsulated, 1922)

Between 1914 and 1923, postage stamps were used to make emergency issue currency. The first issues were pieces of cardboard to which stamps were affixed in denominations of 25 and 50 centimes, 1 and 2 francs, with the 50 centime denominations made from either a single 50 centime stamp or a 15 and a 35 centime stamp. The second issue from 1922 consisted of 25 and 50 centime stamps encapsulated in aluminum.

Between 1918 and 1919, the Nouméa Treasury introduced 50 centime, 1 and 2 franc notes. The Treasury again issued 50 centime, 1 and 2 franc notes in 1942 in the name of the Free French, with 5 and 20 franc notes added in 1943.

In 1969, the Institut d'Emission d'Outre-Mer, Nouméa took over the issuance of paper money, introducing notes for 100, 500, 1000 and 5000 francs. The 100 and 1000 franc notes have two variants. The earlier issue lacked the state title "République française". The 500 and 5000 franc notes have had the state title since their introductions. The 100 franc notes were replaced by coins in 1976.

In 1985, 10,000 franc notes common to all the French Pacific Territories were introduced. Between 1992 and 1996, the remaining 500, 1000 and 5000 franc denominations were replaced with a similarly common design.

In early 2014, the IEOM issued a new series of common banknotes with modern security features, and the older notes were withdrawn from circulation later that year.

== See also ==
- CFP franc
- French Polynesian franc
- New Hebrides franc
