= Gold franc =

Former unit of account

ISO 4217
- Code: XFO

Demographics
- Date of introduction: 1930
- User(s): Bank for International Settlements

Valuation
- Pegged with: 1 XFO = 0.290322 g fine gold
- This infobox shows the latest status before this currency was rendered obsolete.

The gold franc (currency code: XFO) was the unit of account for the Bank for International Settlements from 1930 until April 1, 2003. It was replaced with the special drawing right. It was originally based on the Franc Germinal, and remained at the value the franc was pegged (0.290322 g fine gold) after the countries of the Latin Monetary Union came off the gold standard.

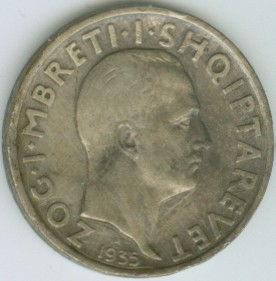
"Gold Franc" of King Zog of the Albanians (not made of gold)

== Use in New Hebrides ==
The gold franc was used in the Anglo-French Condominium of the New Hebrides (now Vanuatu) as the currency in which the joint administration's postal service denominated its stamps, a natural choice as the Universal Postal Union Treaty (beginning in 1874 when the first treaty was agreed and reaffirmed at subsequent Congresses until at least that of 1939—see the various "Actes du Congress...") denominated the agreed international postal rates in gold franc and gold centime leaving each member country and its dependencies to translate the amounts into their own currencies. This added to the already confused situation in which the Australian dollar and the New Hebrides franc were used in normal trade (and in which even the pound sterling turned up in the columns of earlier joint administration budgetary documents).

== Swiss Gold Franc Initiative ==
On March 9, 2011, a parliamentary initiative was introduced in the National Council of Switzerland to institute a gold franc as additional currency for Switzerland:

The Confederation institutes an official gold franc with a set of coins of different denominations, each having a fixed gold content. It regulates the concessions granted to the licensees authorized to mint coins; minting coins is not taxable.

This initiative was examined by the Committee for Economic Affairs and Taxation, which rejected it at the June meeting.

This gold franc would have been defined as 0.1 gram of fine gold. The initiative would not have removed, replaced or pegged the existing Swiss franc, therefore both the gold franc and the Swiss franc would have coexisted side-by-side. Due to the fixed metallic content of the gold franc, its exchange rate with the Swiss franc would have gone up and down according to market supply and demand, like any other free-floating currency.

The gold franc was intended to become a safe-haven currency, to divert international capital flows in times of financial crises away from the Swiss franc.

The gold franc would have been completely independent from the gold reserves of the Swiss National Bank. It would have been minted only by Swiss commercial banks, under the supervision of the Swiss Confederation. The backers of the gold franc hoped that its institution would have made it easier for small savers to invest in gold by reducing the minimum investment and trading unit.
