= French Polynesian franc =

Currency of French Polynesia

The franc is the currency of French Polynesia, part of the CFP franc since 1945 and issued by the Institut d'émission d'outre-mer (IEOM) in Paris. It is subdivided into 100 centimes, although centime denominations are no longer in circulation.

== History ==
Until 1914, the French franc circulated in French Polynesia. That year, banknotes were issued specifically for use on in the colony which circulated along with French coins. Before the introduction of the CFP franc in 1945, the French franc was legal tender in French Polynesia, alongside locally issued franc-denominated banknotes. In 1945, the CFP franc was introduced, with coins issued for French Oceania (Etablisements Français de l'Océanie as the colony was then known) from 1949. From 1965, the name Polynésie Française (French Polynesia) was used. The CFP franc is also issued in New Caledonia, and was used in the New Hebrides until 1982 after its 1980 re-establishment as the Republic of Vanuatu. Since 1985, CFP franc banknotes have been issued common to both French Polynesia and New Caledonia, although separate coinages continued until they were replaced with a single common set of CFP franc coins in 2023.

== Coins ==
In 1949, aluminium coins in 50 centime, 1 and 2 franc denominations bearing the former colonial name Établissements français de l'Océanie were introduced, followed by aluminium 5 franc coins in 1952. The 50 centime coin was only reissued once, in 1965. In the same year, all denominations were reissued with the wording changed to Polynésie Française. In 1967, nickel 10, 20 and 50 franc coins were introduced, followed by nickel-bronze 100 franc coins in 1976.

The overall design of the French Polynesia coins did not change from their introduction until their withdrawal in 2023. The obverse, identical to that of the New Caledonian coins, included the words Republique Français (lit. 'French Republic') and depicted an allegorical representation of Minerva the goddess of wisdom on the 1, 2, and 5 franc coins, or Marianne, symbol of the French Republic, on the higher denominations. The only changes were the removal of the text "Union Française" on 1, 2, and 5 franc coins from 1965, and the addition of the issuer initials "I.E.O.M" (Institut d'émission d'outre-mer) after 1972. On the reverse, the wording changed in 1965 from Établissements français de l'Océanie to Polynésie Française.

Coins of French Polynesia, 1947–2022
Image		Value	Technical parameters				Description			Common name
Obverse	Reverse	Value	Diameter	Thickness	Mass	Composition	Edge	Obverse	Reverse	Common name
		F 1	23 mm		1.3g	aluminium alloy	Plain	Minerva	Coast of French Polynesia	F 1
		F 2	27 mm		2.2g	aluminium alloy	Plain	Minerva	Coast of French Polynesia	F 2
		F 5	31 mm		3.5g	aluminium alloy	Plain	Minerva	Coast of French Polynesia	F 5
		F 10	24 mm		6g	100% nickel, cupronickel after 2005	Milled	Marianne	Tiki	F 10
		F 20	28.5 mm		10g	100% nickel, cupronickel after 2005	Milled	Marianne	Breadfruit	F 20
		F 50	33 mm		15g	100% nickel, cupronickel after 2005	Milled	Marianne	Moʻorea harbour and Mont Routui	F 50
		F 100	30 mm		10g	cupronickel-aluminium	Milled	Marianne	Moʻorea harbour and Mont Routui	F 100
These images are to scale at 2.5 pixels per millimetre. For table standards, see the coin specification table. Source: Numista. See CFP franc for the currently circulating coins.

In September 2021 the IEOM issued a single set of smaller CFP franc coins common to all French Pacific Territories, to replace the two sets of coins used separately for New Caledonia and French Polynesia. The 1 and 2 franc coins were discontinued, and a new bimetallic 200 franc coin was issued. The old coins were withdrawn from circulation in January 2023.

== Banknotes ==
In 1914, the Banque de l'Indochine in Papeete (the capital of French Polynesia on Tahiti) introduced notes for 5, 20 and 100 francs. In 1919, the Chamber of Commerce introduced notes for 25 and 50 centimes, 1 and 2 francs. The Banque André Krajewski also issued notes for these denominations in 1920. The Banque de l'Indochine introduced 500 franc notes in 1923, followed by 1000 francs in 1940.

Wartime emergency currency was issued during both World War I and World War II in denominations ranging from 25 centimes to 2½ francs. The illustrated notes (right) are from the 1943 issue of Bons de Caisse des Etablissements Français de l'Océanie.

French Oceania World War II emergency issue money (1943)
Image	Value	Dimensions (mm)	Main colour
	50^{c}	111 × 71 mm	Orange-red
	F 1	111 × 71 mm	Green
	F 2	111 × 71 mm	Blue
	F 2,50	111 × 71 mm	Black

In 1969, the Institut d'Emission d'Outre-Mer, Papeete took over the issuance of paper money, introducing notes for 100, 500, 1000 and 5000 francs. The 100 and 1000 franc notes have two variants. The earlier issue lacked the state title "République française". The 500 and 5000 franc notes have had the state title since their introductions. The 100 franc notes were replaced by coins in 1976.

In 1985, 10,000 franc notes common to all the French Pacific Territories were introduced. These were followed, between 1992 and 1996, by 500, 1000 and 5000 franc notes for all of the French Pacific Territories.

Banknotes of New Caledonia, Wallis & Futuna, and French Polynesia (1969–2013)
Image	Value	Dimensions (mm)	Main colour
	F 500	150 × 80 mm	Teal
	F 1,000	160 × 85 mm	Orange
	F 5,000	172 × 92 mm	Yellow
	F 10,000	172 × 92 mm	Red
These images are to scale at 0.7 pixel per millimetre (18 pixel per inch). For table standards, see the banknote specification table. Source: Numizon. See CFP franc for the currently circulating banknotes.

In early 2014, the IEOM issued a new series of common banknotes, and the older notes were withdrawn from circulation later that year.

== See also ==
- CFP franc
- New Caledonian franc
- New Hebrides franc
