= New Hebrides franc =

1969–1981 currency of the New Hebrides (now Vanuatu)

Unit
- Symbol: Fr

Denominations
- Subunit
- 100: centime
- Banknotes: 100, 500, 1000 francs
- Coins: 1, 2, 5, 10, 20, 50, 100 francs

Demographics
- Date of introduction: 1969
- Replaced: CFP franc (at par)
- Date of withdrawal: 1981
- Replaced by: Vanuatu vatu (at par)
- User(s): New Hebrides

Issuance
- Central bank: Institut d'émission d'outre-mer (IEOM)
- Website: www.ieom.fr

Valuation
- Inflation: -
- This infobox shows the latest status before this currency was rendered obsolete.

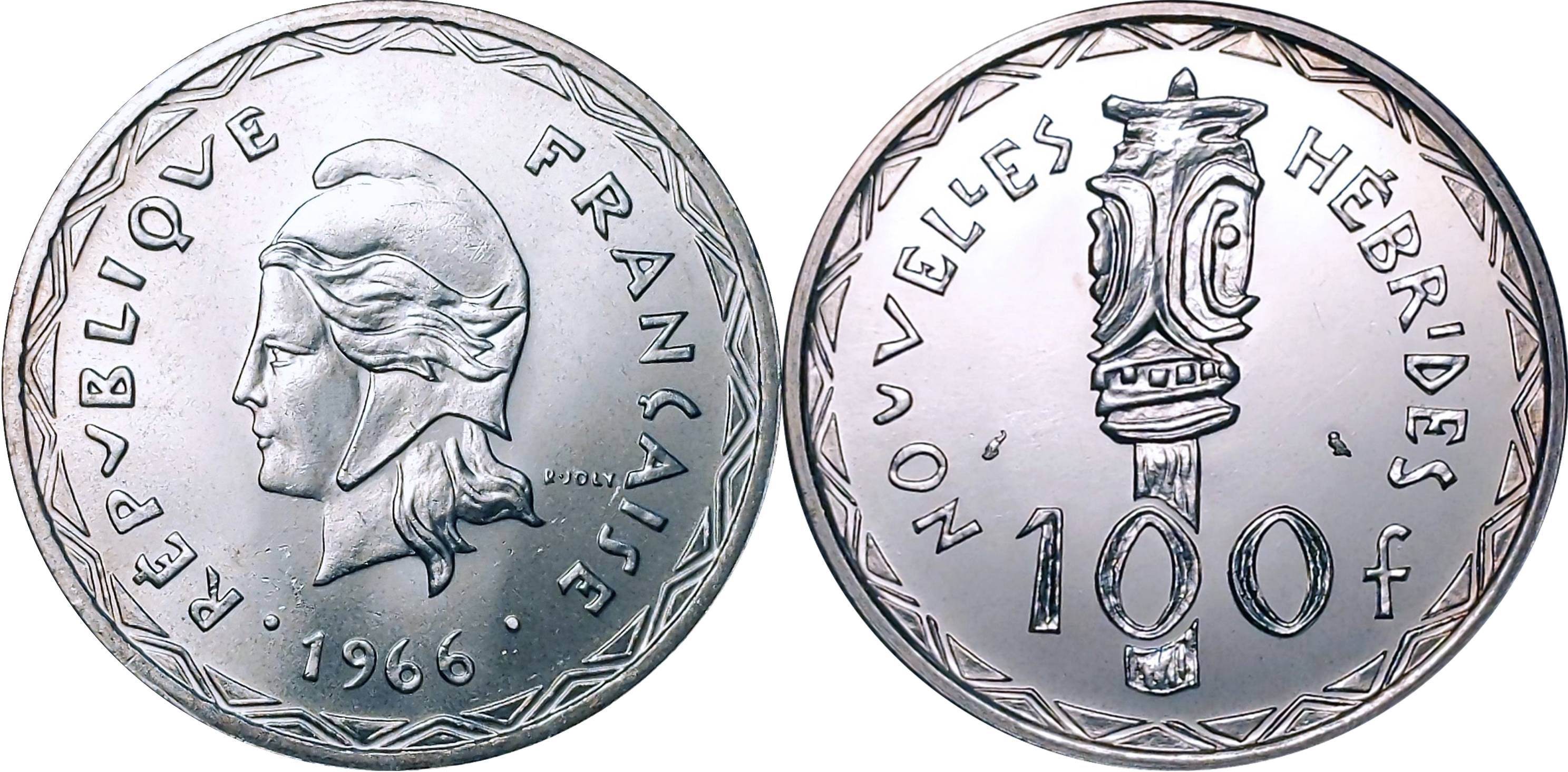
100 Francs of New Hebrides, 1966

The franc was the currency of the Anglo-French Condominium of the Pacific island group of the New Hebrides (which became Vanuatu in 1980). It circulated alongside British and later Australian currency. The New Hebrides franc was nominally divided into 100 Centimes, although the smallest denomination was the 1 franc. Between 1945 and 1969, it was part of the CFP franc.

== History ==
Until World War II, the New Hebrides used the French franc and the British and Australian pounds. In 1941, the Free French forces introduced paper money for circulation on the New Hebrides. In 1945, the CFP franc was introduced to insulate France's Pacific colonies from the devaluation of the French franc and the New Hebrides used a combination of New Caledonian franc coins and locally issued notes.

In 1949, the CFP franc's relationship to the French franc stabilized at 5.5 French francs = 1 CFP franc. From 1959, the exchange rate to the Australian pound was almost exactly 200 francs = 1 pound. This rate became 100 francs = 1 Australian dollar in 1966 when the dollar was introduced. The Australian dollar circulated alongside the local currency.

From 1966, coins were produced in the name of the New Hebrides. In 1969, the New Hebrides franc broke away from the CFP franc and maintained the relationship with the Australian dollar of 100 francs = 1 dollar until 1973. In 1981, the franc was replaced at par by the vatu following independence as Vanuatu. The Australian dollar continued to circulate in Vanuatu until 1983.

== Coins ==
In 1966, silver 100 franc coins were introduced. These were followed by nickel 10 and 20 francs in 1967, nickel-brass 1, 2 and 5 francs in 1970 and nickel 50 francs in 1972. Only the nickel coins (10, 20, and 50 francs) were the same size, composition, and obverse as the corresponding French Polynesian and New Caledonian coins.

The overall design has not changed since the introduction of the New Hebrides franc coins. The only notable change is the addition of "I.E.O.M" (Institut d'émission d'Outre-Mer) in 1973.

== Banknotes ==
The first New Hebridean banknote was issued in 1921, a 25 franc note of the Comptoirs Français des Nouvelles Hébrides (French Trading Posts of the New Hebrides) dated 22 août (August) 1921. This is a very rare note. The New Hebrides began issuing banknotes again in 1941. These were overprints on New Caledonian banknotes (issued by the Banque de l'Indochine), in denominations of 5, 20, 100, 500 and 1000 francs. The same denominations were issued in 1943 by the Free French Services Nationaux Français des Nouvelles Hébrides.

In 1965, the Institut d'Emission d'Outre-Mer took over the issuance of paper money on the New Hebrides and introduced notes in denominations of 100, 500 and 1000 francs between 1965 and 1972. Unlike the French Polynesian and New Caledonian counterparts, New Hebrides never had a 5000 franc note.

== See also ==
- CFP franc
- New Caledonian franc
- French Polynesian franc

Franc
Preceded by: CFP franc Ratio: at par Note: circulated with the Australian pound; Australian dollar after 1966	Currency of New Hebrides (now Vanuatu); 1969 – 1981	Succeeded by: Vanuatu vatu Reason: independence Ratio: at par
