= Staatsbank der DDR =

Central bank of East Germany (1968–90)

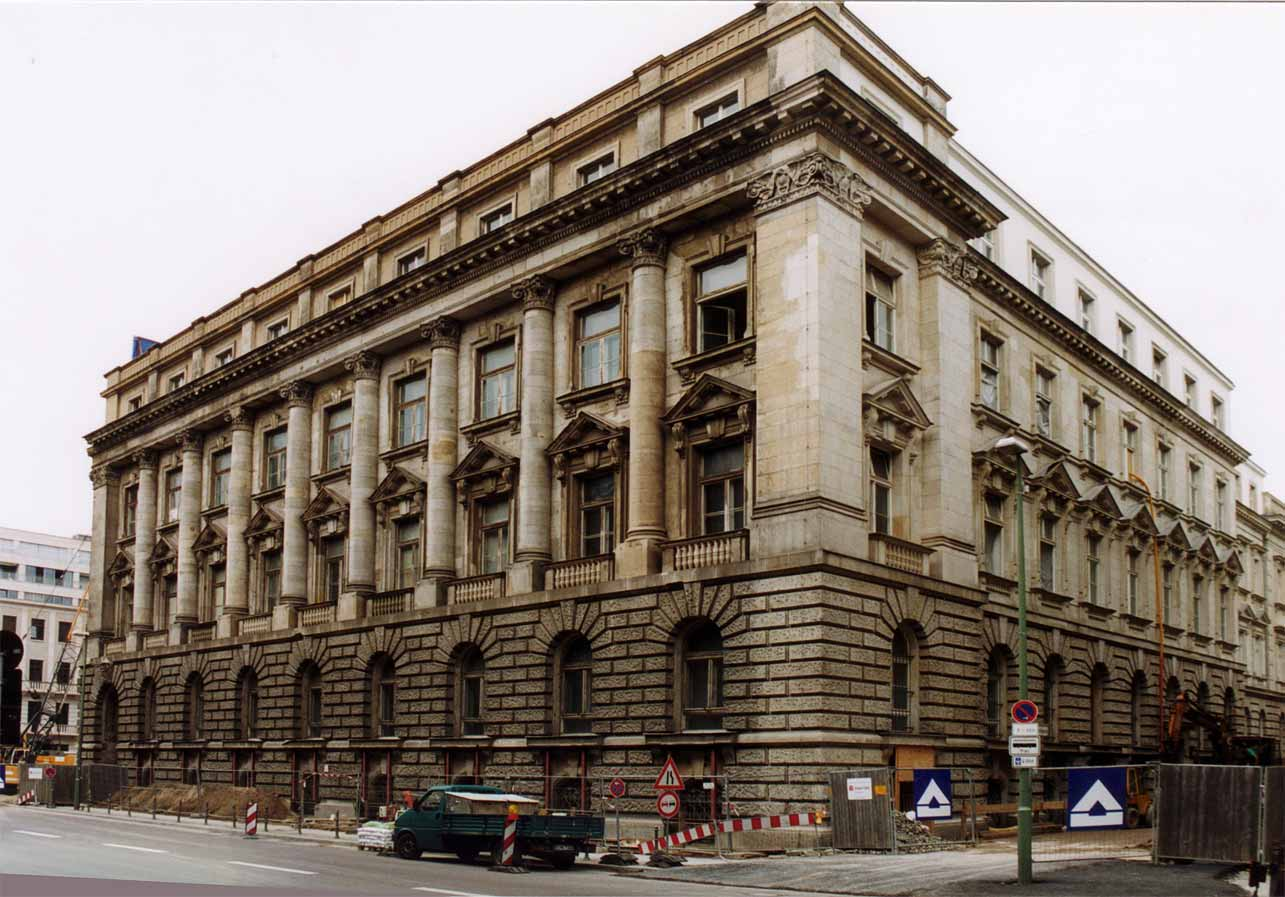
Headquarters of the East German Central Bank

The State Bank of the GDR (German: Staatsbank der DDR) was the central bank of East Germany. It was established on 1 January 1968 from the Deutsche Notenbank and took over the majority of the same tasks.

The State Bank of the GDR was responsible for the administration of the internal account settlement and banking system, the issue of money and control of money circulation within the GDR, administration of the exchange control regulations and settlement of foreign currency accounts with overseas companies and governments (Zahlungsverkehr by transfer). In addition, the bank bought and sold financial securities and administered the purchase, sale and holding of precious metals for foreign exchange purposes.

The state bank was also responsible for the account processing of the state institutions and state enterprises, (Volkseigener Betrieb), having at least one main branch in each of the 15 administrative subdivisions of the German Democratic Republic.

== The internal foreign exchange rate regime ==
Another key task of the State Bank (on which it expended considerable resources) was attempting to control the circulation of foreign exchange within the GDR. This was primarily because of concerns that the circulation of foreign exchange (particularly the Deutsche Mark) could lead to the establishment of a parallel currency that would encourage the black market, damage the East German Mark and the internal economy, and undermine the international prestige of the GDR on its own soil.

Thus citizens of the GDR who were in the possession of foreign exchange (typically Deutsche Marks sent by Western relatives or, for a small minority such as writers and artists, overseas royalties earnings) were obliged to deposit this in a dedicated foreign exchange account with the state bank. In order to encourage compliance, and thereby help “drain” the circulation of foreign currency from the economy, these accounts carried a 1% interest rate premium over the nationally determined fixed interest of 3.25% per annum paid on all other consumer saving accounts.

However, although the interest rate on these accounts was 4.25% per annum, access to the hard currency in the account was far from easy. Technically the foreign currency on deposit was only available for use during authorised travel to Western countries, and was limited to the legitimate foreign currency travel expenses in the country concerned, plus the equivalent of 15 Deutsche Marks per day for other expenses. As the GDR only granted visas to travel to the West in limited circumstances to those below pensionable age (e.g. for weddings, funerals and serious illness of close relatives, business-based attendance at international conferences and trade fairs), and then usually only for very short periods, this effectively “neutralised” the foreign exchange held in the accounts of all those under 65 years old, and limited the usefulness of larger sums to those aged 65 and older.

== Forum checks, Intershops and Genex ==
In order to overcome this obvious disincentive to compliance with the internal foreign exchange rate regime, the State Bank allowed hard currency to be exchanged for Forum checks – a form of internal currency (foreign exchange certificates) that (crucially) could be spent at an Intershop. These were a chain of special shops that offered high quality East German goods (that were otherwise difficult to obtain without joining a long waiting list) at reasonable prices and otherwise unobtainable Western consumer goods (usually at near duty-free price levels) – they were accessible only to foreign tourists with hard currency and East German citizens with Forum checks. Forum checks were purchased at the unrealistic rate of 1 East German Mark for 1 Deutsche Mark – the typical black market exchange rate varied from 5 – 10 East German Marks to the Deutsche Mark.

In addition, it was also possible for holders of a foreign exchange account to order from the hard currency mail order GENEX catalog (GENEX gift service GmbH). This had originally been established to allow Westerners to legitimately send Eastern relatives Western brand (and export quality Eastern) consumer goods, wines, jewellery, delicacies etc. in exchange for hard currency. When used by the holder of a foreign exchange account for such an “internal” GENEX purchase, the cost of the order was debited directly from the account by giro or cheque clearing methods.

== Political control of the State Bank ==
Although the State Bank was always politically subordinate to the GDR government, this was made explicit by a law of 19 December 1974 which defined the State Bank as an organ of the Council of Ministers of the German Democratic Republic and formalised the practice of the bank's president being a member of the Council of Ministers. While this stood in stark contrast to the political independence of West Germany’s Bundesbank it was common during this era for there to be political control over the nation's central bank-–though not usually to the extent found in East Germany and the other Eastern Bloc economies, where the policies and technical operation of the central bank were completely subservient to policies of the governing Socialist Unity Party of Germany.

The State Bank of the GDR was also a member of the International Bank for Economic Co-operation, a Comecon organisation founded in 1957 with its headquarters in Moscow. The nominal currencies used for trading, international clearing and settlement purposes by this organisation were transfer roubles and gold reserves.

== Post reunification ==
After German reunification the bank was privatised by Treuhand and parts of other banks were taken over (see also Deutsche Kreditbank).

== Accommodation ==
The Staatsbank occupied two adjacent urban blocks which before 1945 had been the headquarters, respectively, of Dresdner Bank and of Berliner Handels-Gesellschaft (BHG). Following German reunification, the Dresdner Bank sought restitution of its protected neo-classical building of 1889 at the Bebelplatz, but eventually built its Berlin headquarters on Pariser Platz. The new owner of the original building was determined to be a subsidiary of Commerzbank.

After 1990 the former Dresdner Bank building had mixed fortunes functioning as a local branch of the Dresdner Bank (and featured in the film Run Lola Run). In 2004 it was converted as part of the real estate project OpernCarrée by the hotelier Sir Rocco Forte into a luxury hotel (the Hotel de Rome). The hotel opened on 12 October 2006. The former BHG has become the Berlin seat of the public development bank KfW.

== Presidents of the State Bank ==
- Willy Huhn (1948–1950)
- Greta Kuckhoff (1950–1958)
- Martin Schmidt (1958–1961)
- Rolf Wetzel (1961–1964)
- Helmut Dietrich (1964–1967)
- Margarete Wittkowski (1967–1974)
- Horst Kaminsky (1974–1990)

== See also ==
- List of central banks
- List of banks in Germany
