= Deutsche Notenbank =

East German central bank

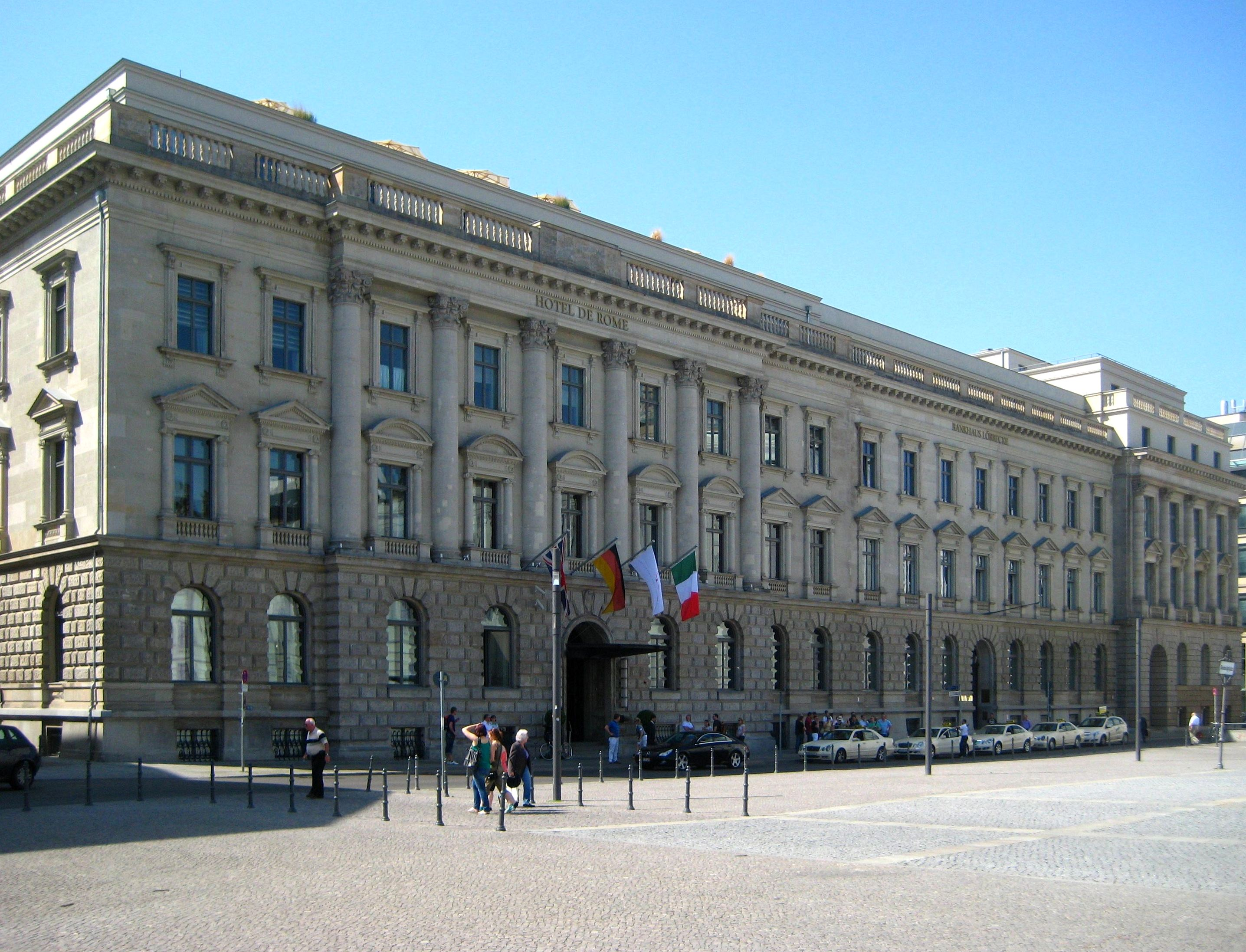
Former head office of Dresdner Bank in Berlin, the seat of the Deutsche Notenbank

The Deutsche Notenbank (lit. 'German Bank of Issue') was a central bank established in 1948 to serve East Germany. It was replaced on 1 January 1968 by the Staatsbank der DDR.

== Overview ==
In the immediate aftermath of German defeat in 1945, the Reichsbank was placed under joint Allied custodianship pending its liquidation. in the Soviet occupation zone, entities dubbed Emissions- und Girobanken were established in May 1947 in each of the zone's five Provinces, namely in Potsdam for Brandenburg, Rostock for Mecklenburg, Dresden for Saxony, Halle for Saxony-Anhalt, and Erfurt for Thuringia. Each of these was fully owned and controlled by the respective provincial authorities.

In 1947, newly appointed U.S. Military Governor Lucius D. Clay fostered the creation of a German central bank. An agreement on that concept was reached among the three Western occupying forces on 30 October 1947, resulting in the establishment on 1 March 1948 of the Bank deutscher Länder. On 21 May 1948, the Soviet occupation authorities replied by establishing a Deutsche Emissions- und Girobank in Potsdam, which was renamed the Deutsche Notenbank in July. It soon relocated to East Berlin.

In line with Soviet doctrine, the Deutsche Notenbank was part of a single-tier banking system in which the central bank had equal status in credit allocation as the other existing banks, including the state banks that had been established in 1946 in each of the occupation zone's five provinces. The early GDR banking system also included a savings bank, a cooperative bank, the Soviet military-linked Garantie- und Kreditbank, and the Berliner Stadtkontor.

== Presidents ==
Greta Kuckhoff, a figure of the German resistance to Nazism, was the President of the Deutsche Notenbank from 1950 to 1958.

- Willy Huhn (1948–1950)
- Greta Kuckhoff (1950–1958)
- Martin Schmidt (1958–1961)
- Rolf Wetzel (1961–1964)
- Helmut Dietrich (1964–1967)
- Margarete Wittkowski (1967)

== See also ==
- German mark
- Bank deutscher Länder
- List of banks in Germany
