= Margarete Wittkowski =

German economist and politician

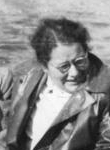
Margarete Wittkowski

Margarete "Grete" Wittkowski (18 August 1910 – 20 October 1974) was a German economist and politician (KPD / SED). Between 1961 and 1967 she served as deputy chair of the East German Council of Ministers, the only woman ever to hold this post. Between 1967 and 1974, she served as President of the East German National Bank.

== Life ==
=== Provenance and early years ===
Margarete Wittkowski was born in Posen. Her father was a businessman: her mother was a pianist. She attended school in Posen till 1926, when the family moved to Berlin. Here, between 1929 and 1932, she studied Social economics ("Volkswirtschaftslehre"). Till 1931 she was active in the Zionist Movement, after which, following "discussions with leftist friends" her political energies were increasingly focused on the Communist Party, which she joined in September 1932.

=== Nazi Germany, Swiss exile (1933-1939) ===
In January 1933 the political backdrop was transformed when the Nazi Party took power and converted Germany into a one-party dictatorship. Political activity - except in support of the Nazi Party - became illegal. At the end of February the Reichstag fire was instantly blamed on the Communists, and in March 1933 those identified as Communists began to be arrested. During 1933 Margarete Wittkowski emigrated to Switzerland, where she enrolled at Basel University and worked on her doctorate dissertation. She passed the oral element of her doctoral exam, for which she was supervised by Edgar Salin and Herman Schmalenbach, in February 1934, for work concerning the relationships between the big banks in Berlin and German industry. Some sources indicate that she received her doctorate in 1934.

She applied to the Budge Foundation for a research stipendium, but was unable to provide the necessary backup information to support a successful application. She was nevertheless able to pursue an academic career, working with Jürgen Kuczynski, a distinguished economist and, like her, a refugee from Nazi Germany. The focus of their work was a study entitled "Die Wirtschaftspolitik der Barbarei, Hitlers neue europäische Wirtschaftsordnung" ("The Economics of Barbarism: Hitler's New Economic Order in Europe"), which in the end was published in 1942, and concerned the economic policy of the fascist states. The authors attacked the widespread contention that the economy in Nazi Germany was unusually efficient. It was their view that labour output was lower and the accident rate was higher than before 1933, and that earnings growth since then was attributable to monopoly practices, reduced raw material costs, a reduction in emphasis on consumer goods and an extension of working hours. There was also a warning directed at the United States (at this stage still not militarily involved against Germany) that successful conquest by Nazi Germany of Europe and the Soviet Union would give rise to a fascist European bloc capable of flooding the world with cheap manufactured goods.

Remarkably, between 1934 and 1938, Wittkowski continued to travel to Germany, while taking care to hasten back to Switzerland when the situation appeared to be becoming too dangerous. In the spring of 1934, she moved to Berlin, where she co-produced a communist trades union newspaper with a like-minded comrade called Ullrich Fuchs. Early the next year she narrowly escaped arrest, emigrating again to Switzerland in February 1935. She worked on several newspapers for distribution to southern Germany, including an illegal newspaper aimed at farming communities. Other newspapers for which she wrote include the Süddeutsche Volksstimme and Süddeutsche Informationen. She was also involved in distribution, according to one source making "frequent trips to "the southern Baden border area where she handed over illegal publications and messages". There are references to her having at times undertaken her courier activities under the cover name "Hilde". There was also at least one visit to Paris, in October 1936, which at this time had become the de facto headquarters of the Germany Communist Party in exile.

=== British exile (1939-1946) ===
In November 1938, a few days after the "Kristallnacht" pogroms across the border, Wittkowski was arrested in Zürich and expelled from the country for her "illegal political activities". She lived - now illegally - in Basel for another six months, after which, in April 1939, she succeeded in escaping to England, where her literary collaborator Jürgen Kuczynski had been based since 1936. Sources are largely silent over her activities in England during the war years. Unlike many political refugees from Nazi Germany, there is no record of her having been interned as an enemy alien by the English when war broke out, which may well reflect her work with Kuczynski who had excellent connections with elements of the British establishment. It is on record that until 1943 she worked for the Comintern with Harry Pollitt, a leading member of the Communist Party. She appears to have been considered a leader among the exiled German communists in England.

=== Soviet occupation zone (1946-1949) ===
Margarete Wittkowski returned to Berlin in June 1946. The region surrounding the city was now administered as the Soviet occupation zone, although the contentious creation of the Socialist Unity Party ("Sozialistische Einheitspartei Deutschlands" / SED) a couple of months earlier had already created a necessary precondition for its relaunch in October 1949 as a new kind of one-party dictatorship, the German Democratic Republic (East Germany). Wittkowski joined the SED in 1946. Jürgen Kuczynski was already back in town, and together they founded a weekly newspaper called "Die Wirtschaft" ("The Economy"). She also took charge of the economics section of Neues Deutschland, the newly established mass-circulation daily newspaper of the recently established Socialist Unity Party. Sources nevertheless indicate that Wittkowski objected to being given work as a journalist because she wished to contribute more directly to rebuilding the country.

In 1947 or 1948 she joined the German Economic Commission established by the occupation forces. Working closely with Bruno Leuschner, this involved a central role in devising the planned economic model for the new socialist German state. In 1949/50 she attended a course at the Party Academy. There was a study period in Moscow. In 1950/51 she served as vice president on the German Economic Commission for what had become, in October 1949, the German Democratic Republic (East Germany).

=== German Democratic Republic (1949-1974) ===
In 1951 Wittkowski was transferred to the Consumer Co-operatives Association, an office she held till 1954. This was a demotion, attributed by one source to an emulation by Walter Ulbricht of Stalin's 1951 purge of "zionist conspirators". Others, referring to her time in England, are content to point out that during this time "those who had emigrated to the West were more likely to be considered as unreliable comrades". Whatever the reason for her removal from the German Economic Commission, it does appear that Wittkowski was respected for her formidable intellect, which unlike others she was sometimes willing to deploy in discussions involving Walter Ulbricht, the country's leader.

After Stalin died, in March 1953, the East German party leadership became slightly less nervous, and in 1954 she was reinstated as deputy president of what had now become the State Planning Commission, which gave her significant influence over national economic policy. In April 1954 Wittkowski was also elected a member of the powerful Party Central Committee, which under the Leninist power structure employed in East Germany was the real focus of political power. She also sat as a member of the national parliament ("Volkskammer") between 1952 and 1958, and again between 1963 and 1967.

Between 1956 and 1958, Wittkowski found herself increasingly out of line with the leadership, both because of differences over aspects of economic policy and because she sought to open a spirit of wider debate. In a speech delivered on 22 March 1956 to the Central Committee plenum she criticised Ulbricht over his failure to brief Central Committee members on the momentous events at the Soviet 20th Party Congress in Moscow the previous month: she urged a little more openness within the East German Central Committee. Wittkowski advocated greater priority be given to profitability and the needs of the population. At the Central Committee plenum in November 1956 she called for greater decentralisation of economic decision making. Addressing the Central Committee plenum in November 1956, she criticised the "bureaucratic" actions of many functionaries, which she characterised as discrediting the "party and the government". She also appealed for a less confrontational policy with socialists in the German Federal Republic, where a court imposed ban on the Communist Party in August 1956 failed to trigger significant protests by West German workers. There were two German states but there was only one German working class. Wittkowski might have taken a lead within the Central Committee in criticising aspects of economic policy, but she was not a lone voice. Inside the Central Committee, Karl Schirdewan and Ernst Wollweber were voicing similar sentiments. Other prominent critics of the party line were Gerhart Ziller, Fred Oelßner and Fritz Selbmann.

However, whereas Wittkowski saw in the Social Democratic Party (SPD) in West Germany a potential ally in support of workers and in opposition to the Adenauer régime, Ulbricht saw the western SPD, even before publication in 1959 of the Godesberg Program, as irredeemably counter-revolutionary. The idea that one might "do business" with them was a repudiation of valued Stalinist dogma. More generally, he was underwhelmed by her economic and other criticisms. Her advocacy of "socialist self-management" led to a charge of "Managerism". In February 1958 the Central Committee plenum endorsed the orthodox line advocated by General Secretary Ulbricht: Wittkowski underwent a "temporary demotion". (For the other critics named in the previous paragraph demotion was permanent) She was removed from her deputy presidency of the State Planning Commission and her name was no longer included on the party list for the Volkskammer election that year. She was also resigned from the Central Committee, although her name now appeared on the list of candidates for Central Committee membership, an indulgence not afforded to comrades Schirdewan and Wollweber.

She was quickly restored to the State Planning Commission vice-presidency, although now there was more than one vice-president so that her relative stature within the body was diminished. A few years later, after 1961, the economic reforms branded as the "New Economic System", reflecting a modest loosening of centralised control across the entire "Eastern Bloc" seemed to acknowledge concerns that had been expressed by Wittkowski three years before. She herself remained at this point outside the Party Central Committee Politburo, but her principal interlocutor within it was Werner Jarowinsky who had been a pupil of her old friend and literary collaborator, Jürgen Kuczynski. In February 1961 she resigned from the State Planning Commission for the last time and took up a post as a deputy chair of the Council of Ministers, where her departmental responsibilities covered Trade, Supply, and Agriculture. Over the years there were many deputy chairmen of the Council of Ministers, but Wittkowski was the only woman ever to be numbered among them. She held this post till July 1967. Meanwhile, in 1963 she was readmitted to the Party Central Committee.

Margarete Wittkowski's final big job, to which she was appointed in 1967, was the presidency of what was renamed, on 1 January 1968, the East German Central Bank (Staatsbank). She held this position until her death, which took place while she was travelling, at Singen on the southwestern edge of West Germany.
