= Forum check =

Form of hard currency in East Germany

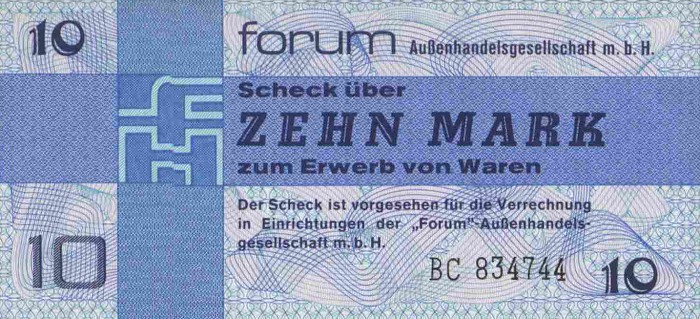
Forum check for 10 Marks

Forum checks (German: Forumscheck) were a form of hard currency in East Germany. From April 1979, all East Germans were required by law to convert any Deutsche Marks of West Germany (and other western currencies) they possessed into Forum checks at a branch of the Staatsbank der DDR immediately. A Forum check Mark was worth 1 West German Deutsche Mark, the smallest denomination was 50 Pfennigs and the highest was for 500 West German Deutsche Marks. Forum checks were accepted in Intershops as payment for western consumer goods and other products which were available in these shops only.

Forum checks were a type of foreign exchange certificate.

Foreign citizens could use western currencies in these shops.

== Denominations ==
Face value	Obverse	Reverse	Dimensions
0.50 Mark	50-Pfennig-Forumscheck (obverse)	50-Pfennig-Forumscheck (reverse)	109 × 48 mm
1 Mark	1-Mark-Forumscheck (obverse)	1-Mark-Forumscheck (reverse)	115 × 51 mm
5 Mark	5-Mark-Forumscheck (obverse)	5-Mark-Forumscheck (reverse)	121 × 54 mm
10 Mark	10-Mark-Forumscheck (obverse)	10-Mark-Forumscheck (reverse)	127 × 57 mm
50 Mark	50-Mark-Forumscheck (obverse)	50-Mark-Forumscheck (reverse)	133 × 60 mm
100 Mark	100-Mark-Forumscheck (obverse)	100-Mark-Forumscheck (reverse)	139 × 63 mm
500 Mark	500-Mark-Forumscheck (obverse)	500-Mark-Forumscheck (reverse)	145 × 66 mm

== See also ==
- Foreign exchange certificate
- Bon Towarowy PeKaO
