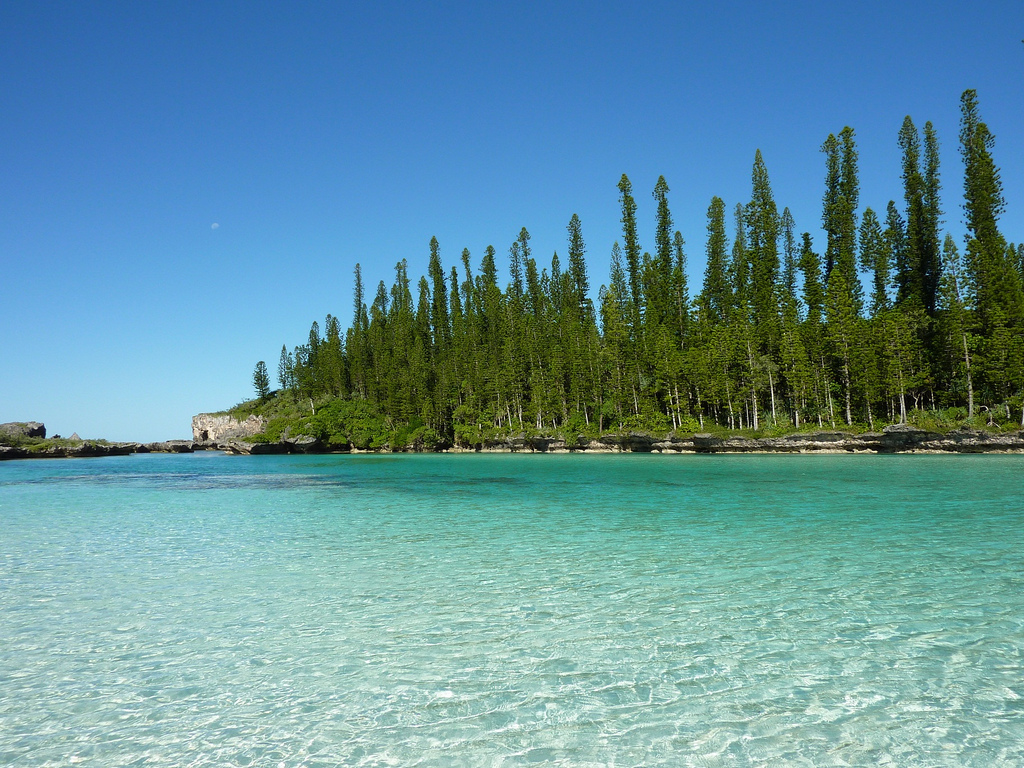

Conservation status
- Least Concern (IUCN 3.1)

Scientific classification
- Kingdom: Plantae
- Clade: Tracheophytes
- Clade: Gymnosperms
- Division: Pinophyta
- Class: Pinopsida
- Order: Araucariales
- Family: Araucariaceae
- Genus: Araucaria
- Section: A. sect. Eutacta
- Species: A. columnaris

Binomial name
- Araucaria columnaris J.R.Forst. Hook.

Synonyms
- Araucaria cookii R.Br. ex Endl.; Araucaria excelsa (Lamb.) R.Br.; Araucaria intermedia R.Br. ex Vieill.; Columbea excelsa (Lamb.) Spreng.; Cupressus columnaris J.R.Forst.; Dombeya excelsa Lamb.; Eutacta cookii Carrière; Eutacta excelsa (Lamb.) Link; Eutacta humilis Carrière; Eutacta minor Carrière; Eutassa columnaris (G.Forst.) de Laub.

= Araucaria columnaris =

Species of conifer

Araucaria columnaris, the coral reef araucaria, Cook pine (or Cook's pine), New Caledonia pine, Cook araucaria, or columnar araucaria, is a species of conifer in the family Araucariaceae.

== Distribution ==
The tree is endemic to New Caledonia in the Melanesia region of the Pacific.

It was first classified by Johann Reinhold Forster, a botanist on the second voyage of Captain James Cook to circumnavigate the globe as far south as possible. It is named directly after Cook, and not from the Cook Islands.

== Description ==
Araucaria columnaris is a distinctive narrowly conical tree growing up to 60 m (200 ft) tall in its native habit. The trees have a slender, spire-like crown. The shape of young trees strongly resembles A. heterophylla. The bark peels off in thin paper-like sheets or strips and is rough, grey, and resinous. The relatively short, mostly horizontal branches are in whorls around the slender, upright to slightly leaning trunk. The branches are lined with cord-like, horizontal branchlets. The branchlets are covered with small, green, incurved, point-tipped, spirally arranged, overlapping leaves. The young leaves are needle-like, while the broader adult leaves are triangular and scale-like.

The female seed cones are scaly, egg-shaped, and 10–15 cm (4–6 in) long by 7–11 cm (3–4 in) wide. The smaller, more numerous male pollen cones are at the tips of the branchlets and are scaly, foxtail-shaped, and 5 cm (2 inches) long.

A 2017 study found that Cook pine tends to have a tilt dependent on the hemisphere of its location, growing upright on the Equator but leaning south in the northern hemisphere and north in the southern hemisphere.

== Ornamental tree ==
It is cultivated in gardens and public landscapes in New South Wales, Queensland and Victoria in Australia, northern New Zealand, Southern California, Puerto Rico, Mexico, India, Philippines, Hawaii, South Brazil, Singapore, and Southeast Brazil. Many of the "Norfolk Island pines" that grow in Hawaii, including their descendants used as potted ornamentals on the U.S. mainland, are actually A. columnaris, the two species having been confused when introduced. The stoutest recorded, an ornamental specimen at Ulupalakua, Maui, Hawaiʻi is only 1.2 m (3 ft 11 in) in diameter at breast height.

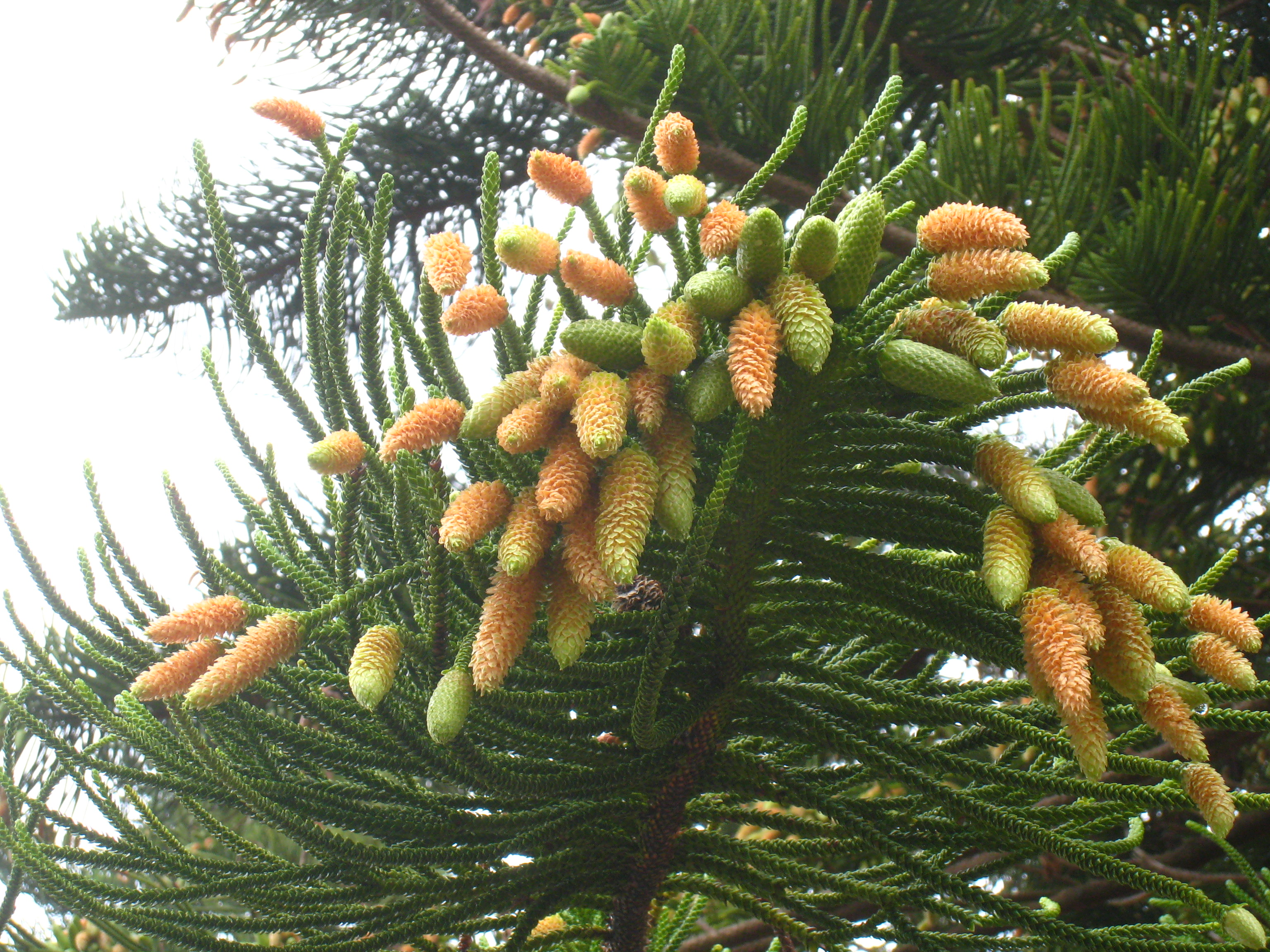
Male cones

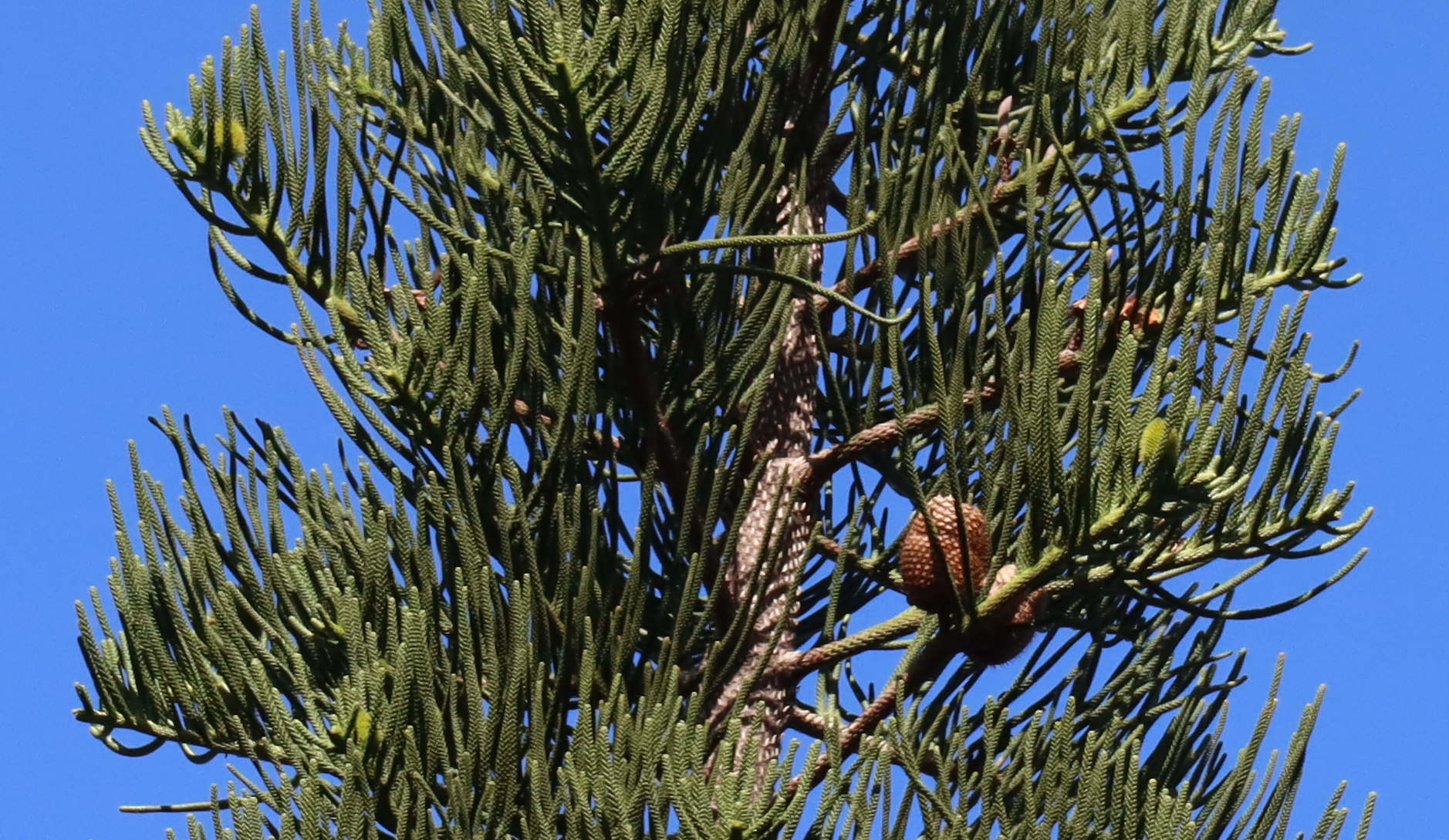
Female cones

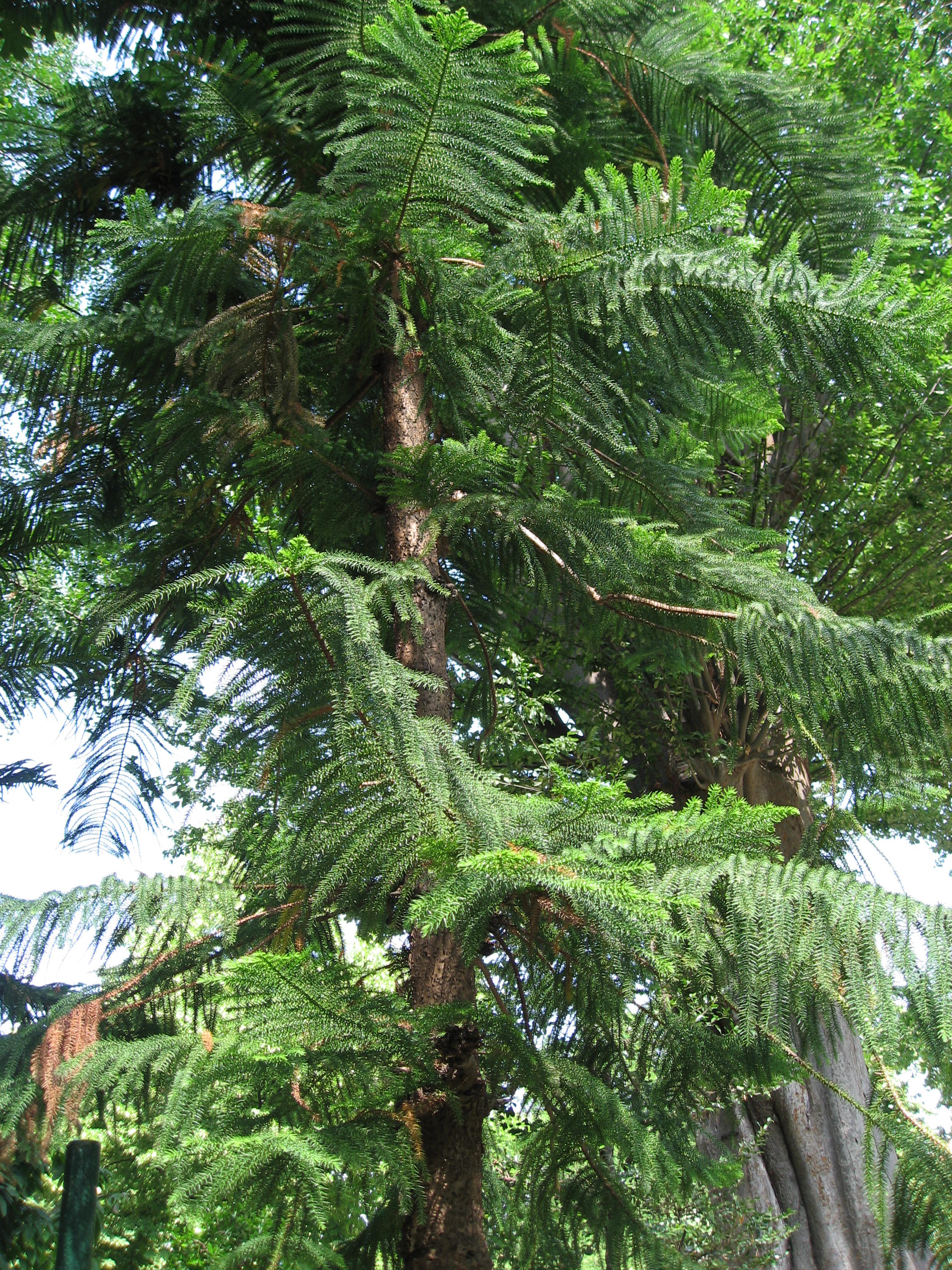
Foliage
