= Institut d'émission d'outre-mer =

French public financial institution

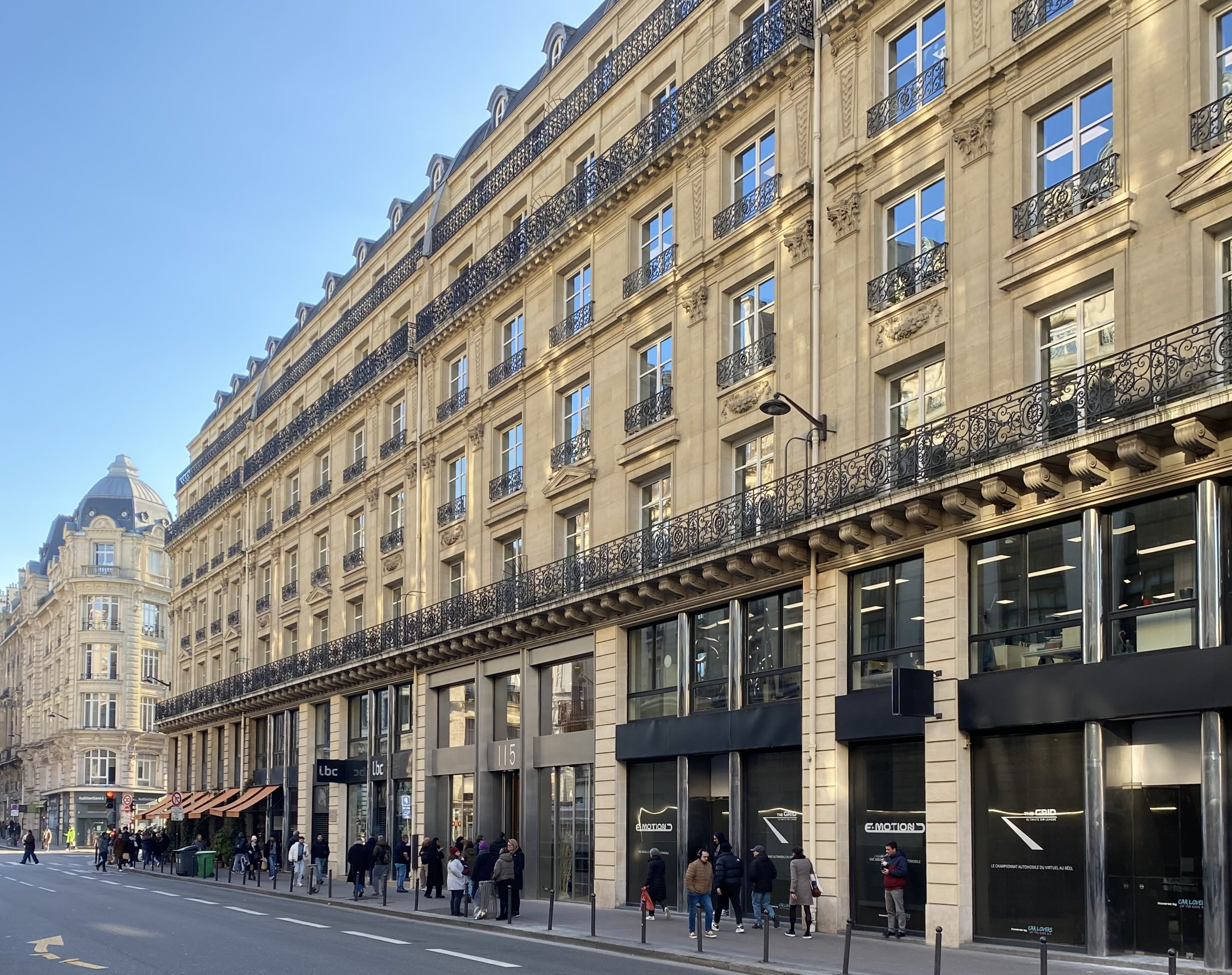
Building at 115, rue Réaumur in Paris, the head office of IEOM and IEDOM

The Institut d'émission d'outre-mer (IEOM, lit. 'overseas institution of issue') is a public bank of issue that issues the CFP franc, the currency of the French overseas collectivities French Polynesia, New Caledonia, and Wallis and Futuna.

== Overview ==
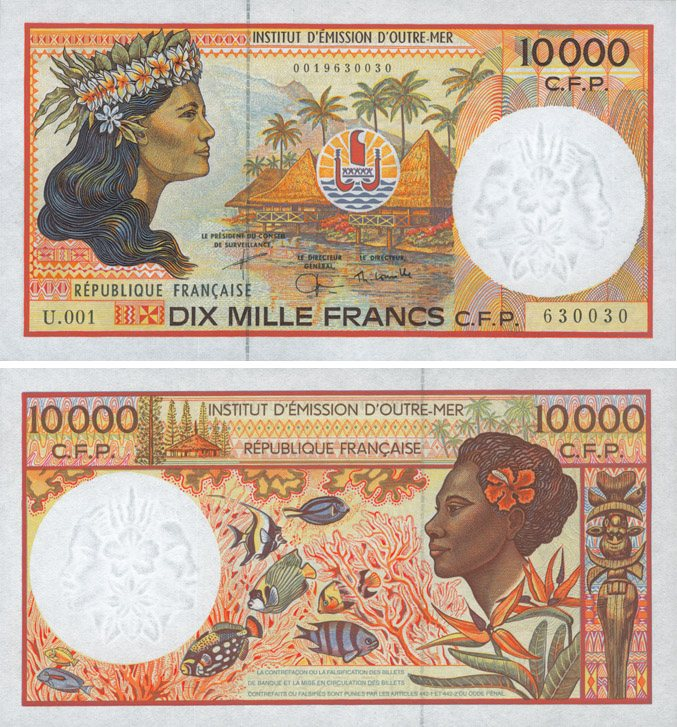
CFP franc banknote of the IEOM, 2006

The IEOM was created in late 1966 to assume the issuance role that had been held until then by the Banque de l'Indochine in France's Pacific territories. It took over that role on 1 April 1967. While it was established as an autonomous entity under public-sector law (French: établissement public), the Caisse Centrale de Coopération Économique (CCCE) was instrumental in its formation, and hosted it during the next four decades; the head of the CCCE and its successor entities (Caisse Française de Développement from 1992, then Agence Française de Développement / AFD from 1998) was also the head of the IEOM.

In 2006, that arrangement was modified as a delayed consequence of the Economic and Monetary Union of the European Union. The IEOM remained associated with the AFD in a common management framework (French: union économique et sociale), but its director-general was henceforth appointed by the Bank of France and its headquarters separated from AFD and merged with that of the Institut d'Émission des Départements d'Outre-Mer (IEDOM). In March 2018, the common management framework of IEOM and IEDOM with AFD was terminated, and the IEOM's seat was relocated (together with IEDOM) from 164, rue de Rivoli in the Louvre Saint-Honoré building to 115, rue Réaumur in central Paris. Since then, the IEOM has been operationally managed by the Bank of France (which in 2017 became the full owner of IEDOM) even though it has its own governance framework that also involves the Treasury, the Ministry of Economics, the Ministry of the Overseas, as well as representatives from the three territories and staff. It has offices in Papeete, Nouméa, and Mata Utu.

== See also ==
- Institut d'Émission
- List of central banks
