= Banque des Îles Saint-Pierre-et-Miquelon =

Former bank in Saint-Pierre-et-Miquelon, France

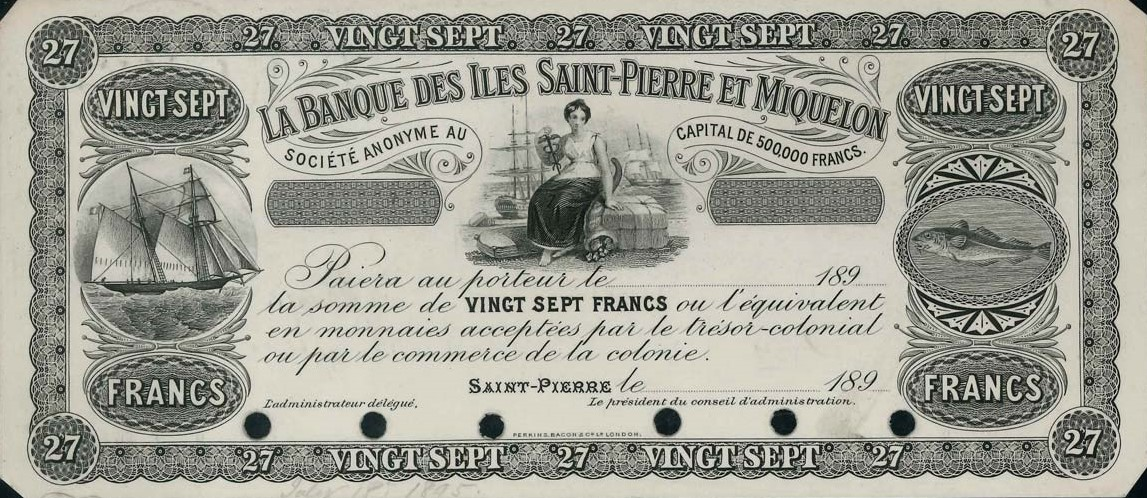
Banknote of the Banque des Îles Saint-Pierre-et-Miquelon, 1897

The Banque des Îles Saint-Pierre-et-Miquelon was a bank of issue on the islands of Saint Pierre and Miquelon, France. It was established in 1889, lost its monetary role in the late 1910s, and in 2015 became a fully owned subsidiary of Caisse d'Épargne Provence Alpes Corse (CEPAC).

== Overview ==
Unlike its older peers in Guadeloupe, French Guiana, Martinique, Réunion, or Sénégal, the Banque des Îles Saint-Pierre-et-Miquelon was born of private-sector initiative rather than as a government project. It was established in 1889 by Saint-Martin Légasse of the Légasse family of French Basque descent.

The bank lost its issuance privilege in the aftermath of World War I, when it was taken over directly by the Bank of France. The Banque des Îles Saint-Pierre-et-Miquelon survived as a commercial bank. In June 2009, it merged with the Crédit Saint-Pierrais to form the Banque de Saint-Pierre-et-Miquelon (BDSPM). In 2015, BDSPM was taken over by the Caisse d'Épargne Provence-Alpes-Corse (CEPAC), an entity of Groupe BPCE based in Marseille. The CEPAC fully absorbed the BDSPM in 2016, at the same time as it did with the former Banque des Antilles Françaises and Banque de la Réunion.

== See also ==
- Saint Pierre and Miquelon franc
- Banque de l'Indochine
- Banque de Madagascar
- List of banks in France
