= Saint Pierre and Miquelon franc =

The Saint Pierre and Miquelon franc was the currency of Saint Pierre and Miquelon during a short time.

== History ==
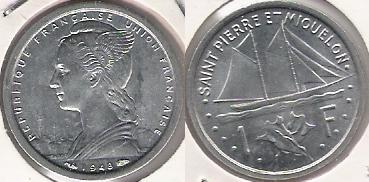
A 1948 Aluminum Franc coin

Before 1890, the French franc and Canadian dollar both circulated on the islands. These were supplemented with local banknotes of the Banque des Îles Saint-Pierre-et-Miquelon from 1890. The exchange rate of 5.4 francs = 1 dollar was used on the island, although the exchange rate from the two gold standards was 5.1826 francs = 1 dollar. After the franc left the gold standard, only the franc circulated.

During the Second World War, a full set of banknotes was introduced for the islands. In 1945, Saint Pierre and Miquelon adopted a franc tied to the CFA franc, thus avoiding some of the devaluation imposed on the metropolitan currency (cf. Réunion franc). Coins were issued for the islands in 1948.

In 1960, Saint Pierre and Miquelon adopted the new franc, with 50 old francs = 1 new franc. Local banknotes were used until 1965, when the islands began using French currency along with Canadian currency. The islands continue to use both French and Canadian currencies, with the euro replacing the franc in 2002.

== Coins ==
Saint Pierre and Miquelon's only coins were aluminium 1 and 2 francs coins struck in 1948.

== Banknotes ==
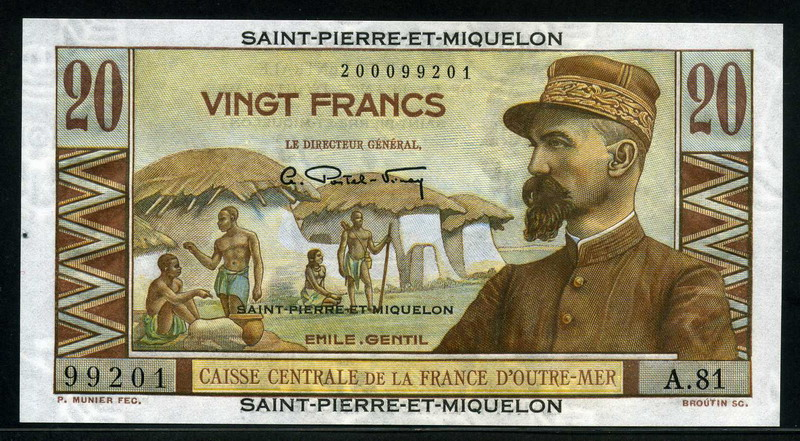
Saint Pierre and Miquelon 20 Francs banknote

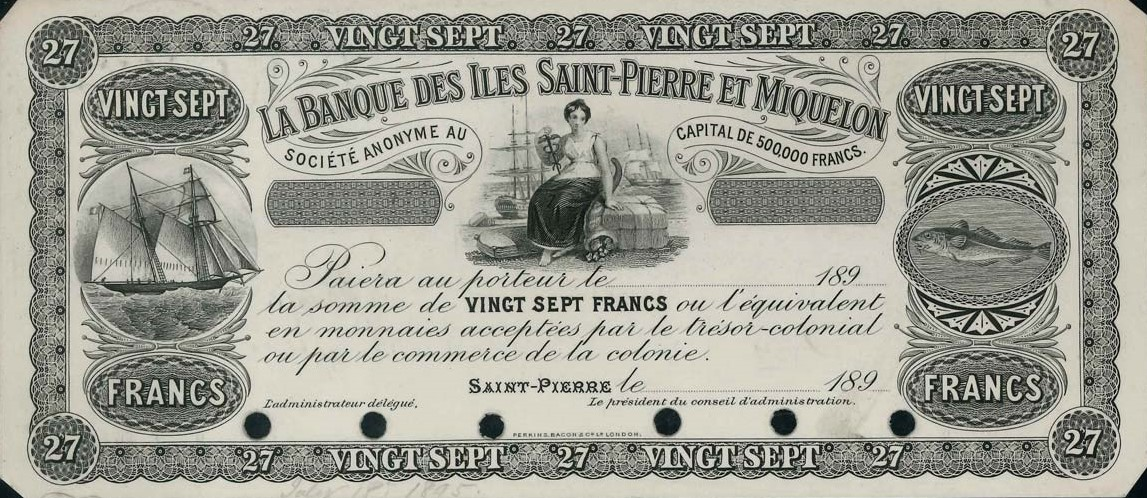
Banknote of 27 francs of 1897

Between 1890 and 1895, the Banque des Isles Saint-Pierre et Miquelon issued 27 and 54 francs notes. These unusual denominations were equivalent to 5 and 10 Canadian dollars. In 1920, the Chamber of Commerce introduced notes in denominations of 0.05, 0.1, 0.25, 0.5, 1 and 2 francs.

In 1943, the Caisse Centrale de la France Libre introduced notes in denominations of 5, 10, 20, 100 and 1000 francs. These were followed from 1945 by issues of the Caisse Centrale de la France d'Outre-Mer in denominations of 5, 20 and 1000 francs, followed by 10 francs in 1946, 50 francs in 1947 and 100, 500 and 5000 francs in 1950.

From 1960, notes were issued overprinted with the value in new francs. These were in denominations of 1, 2, 10, 20 and 100 new francs, overprinted on 50, 100, 500, 1000 and 5000 francs notes. It was subdivided into 100 centimes.
