= Franc =

Name of several currency units

Franc

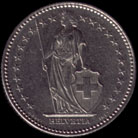
1 Swiss franc 1983 obverse

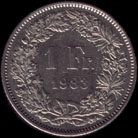
1 Swiss franc 1983 reverse

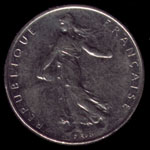
1 French franc 1991 coin obverse

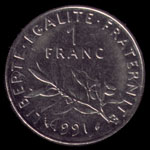
1 French franc 1991 coin reverse

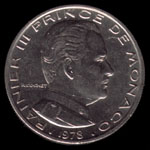
1 Monaco franc 1978 coin obverse

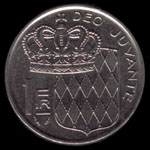
1 Monaco franc 1978 coin reverse

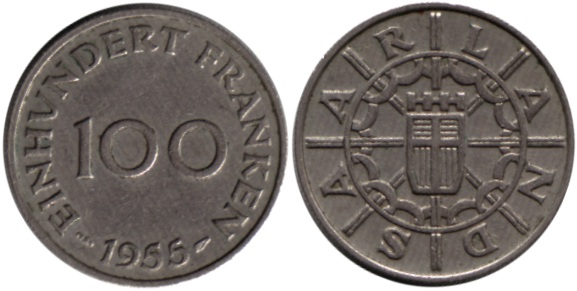
100 Saar francs reverse and obverse

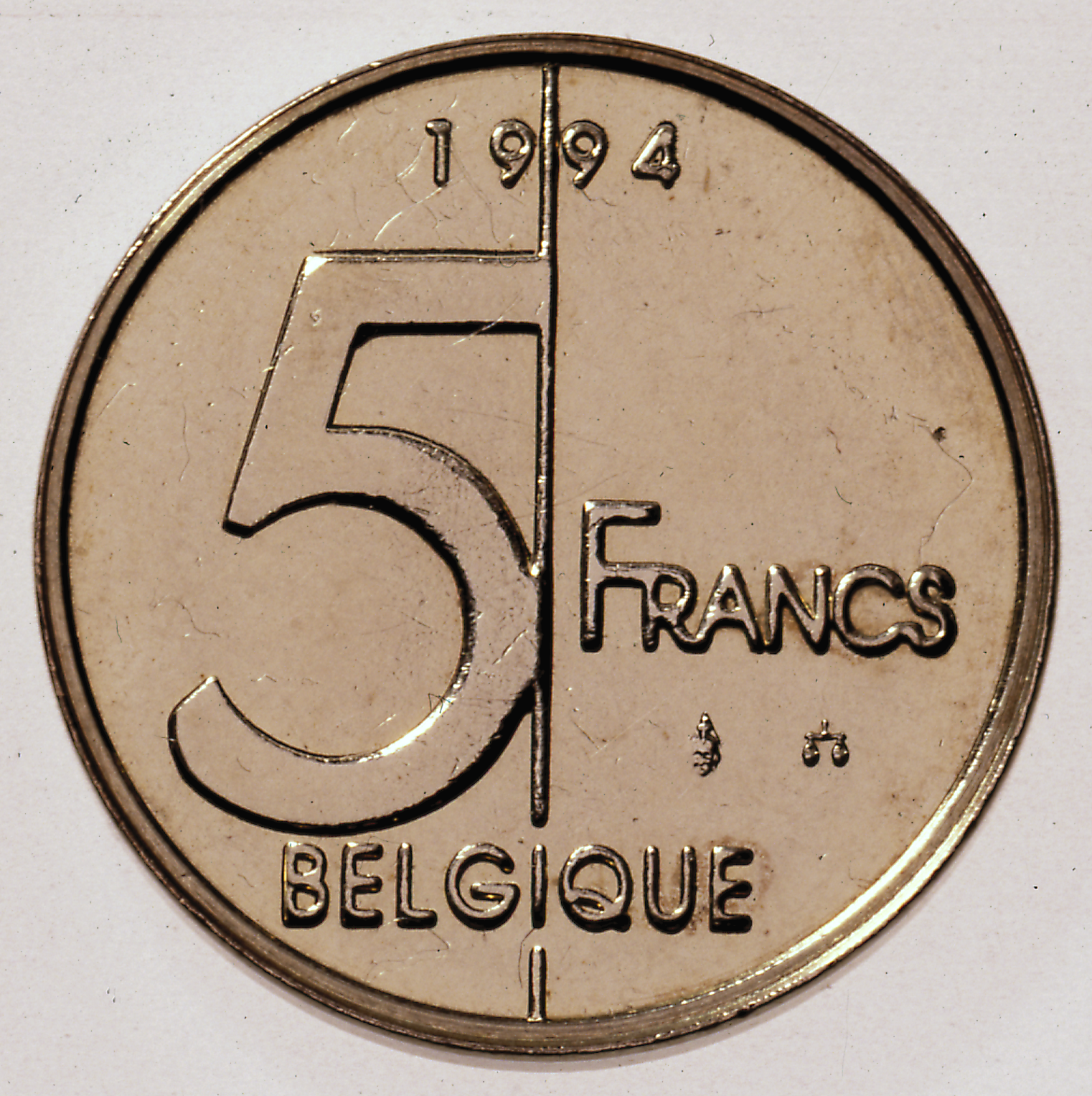
5 Belgian franc 1994 coin reverse

The franc is any of various units of currency. One franc is typically divided into 100 centimes. The name is said to derive from the Latin inscription francorum rex (King of the Franks) used on early French coins and until the 18th century, or from the French franc, meaning "frank".

The countries that use francs today include Switzerland, Liechtenstein, and most of Francophone Africa. The Swiss franc is a major world currency today due to the prominence of Swiss financial institutions.

Before the introduction of the euro on 1 January 1999, francs were also used in France, Belgium and Luxembourg, while Andorra and Monaco accepted the French franc as legal tender (Monégasque franc). The franc was also used in former French colonies including Algeria and Cambodia. The franc is sometimes Italianised or Hispanicised as the franco, for instance in Luccan franco.

== Origins ==
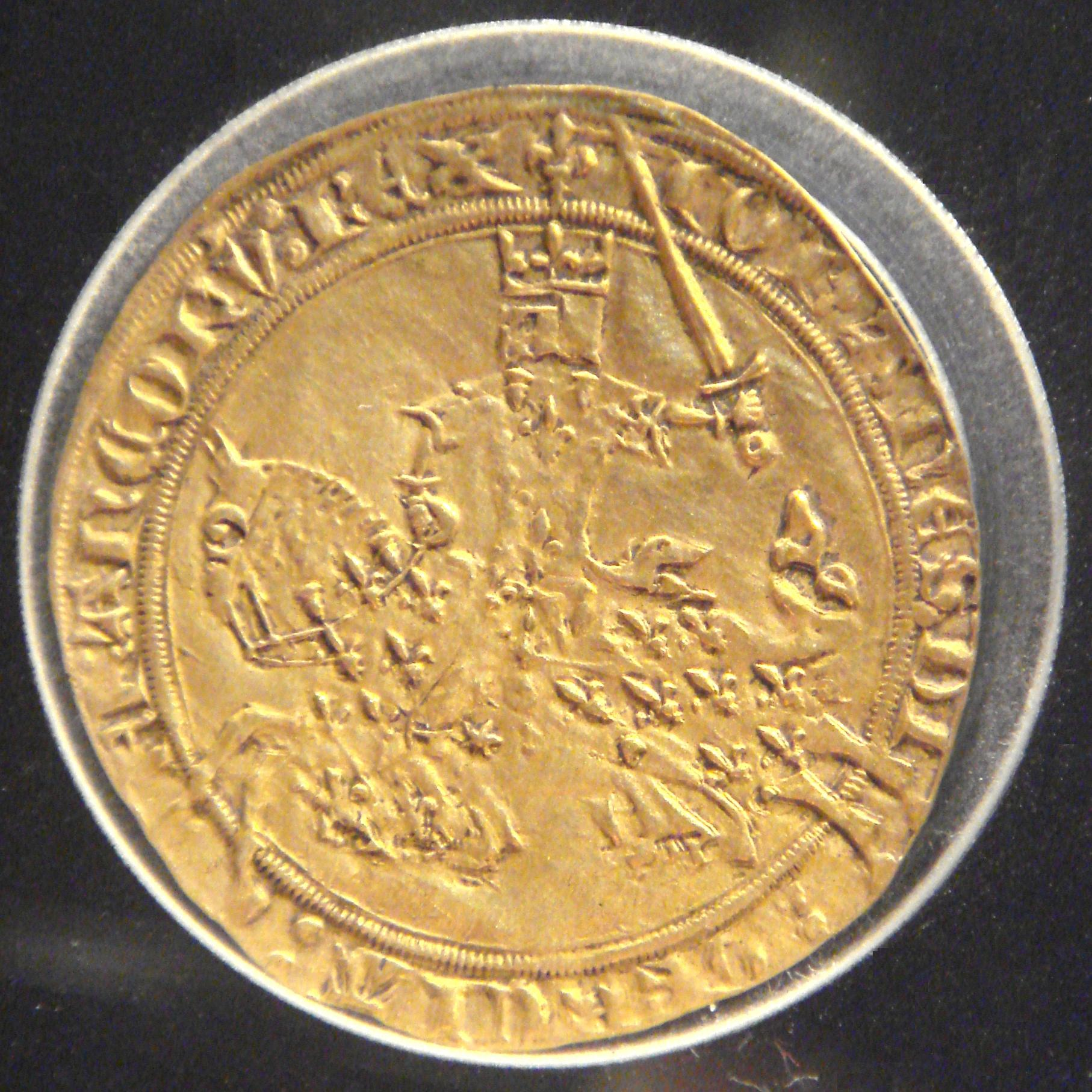
The first franc ever minted, the franc à cheval, was minted upon Jean le Bon's return from captivity from 5 December 1360, and featured combative imagery. Gold, 24 karats, 3.73 g. It conveniently coincided with the account value of one livre tournois.

The franc was originally a French gold coin of 3.87 g minted in 1360 on the occasion of the release of King John II ("the Good"), held by the English since his capture at the Battle of Poitiers four years earlier. It was equivalent to one livre tournois (Tours pound).

== French franc ==
The French franc was originally a gold coin issued in France from 1360 until 1380, then a silver coin issued between 1575 and 1641. The franc finally became the national currency from 1795 until 1999 (franc coins and notes were legal tender until 2002). Though abolished as a legal coin by King Louis XIII in 1641 in favor of the gold louis and silver écu, the term franc continued to be used in common parlance for the livre tournois. The franc was also minted for many of the former French colonies, such as Morocco, Algeria, French West Africa, and others. Today, after independence, many of these countries continue to use the franc as their standard denomination.

The value of the French franc was locked to the euro at 1 euro = 6.55957 FRF on 31 December 1998, and after the introduction of the euro notes and coins, ceased to be legal tender after 28 February 2002, although they were still exchangeable at banks until 19 February 2012.

== CFA and CFP francs ==
Fourteen African countries use the franc CFA (in west Africa, Communauté financière africaine; in equatorial Africa, Coopération financière en Afrique centrale), originally (1945) worth 1.7 French francs and then from 1948, 2 francs (from 1960: 0.02 new franc) but after January 1994 worth only 0.01 French franc. Therefore, from January 1999, 1 CFA franc is equivalent to €0.00152449.

A separate (franc CFP) circulates in France's Pacific territories, worth €0.0084 (formerly 0.055 French franc).

== Comorian franc ==
In 1981, the Comoros established an arrangement with the French government similar to that of the CFA franc. Originally, 50 Comorian francs were worth 1 French franc. In January 1994, the rate was changed to 75 Comorian francs to the French franc. Since 1999, the currency has been pegged to the euro.

== Belgian franc and Luxembourg franc ==
The conquest of most of western Europe by Revolutionary and Napoleonic France led to the franc's wide circulation. Following independence from the Kingdom of the Netherlands, the new Kingdom of Belgium in 1832 adopted its own Belgian franc, equivalent to the French one, followed by Luxembourg adopting the Luxembourgish franc in 1848 and Switzerland in 1850. Newly unified Italy adopted the lira on a similar basis in 1862.

In 1865, France, Belgium, Switzerland and Italy created the Latin Monetary Union (to be joined by Spain and Greece in 1868): each would possess a national currency unit (franc, lira, peseta, drachma) worth 4.5 g of silver or 0.290322 g of gold (fine), all freely exchangeable at a rate of 1:1. In the 1870s the gold value was made the fixed standard, a situation which was to continue until 1914.

In 1926, Belgium as well as France experienced depreciation and an abrupt collapse of confidence, leading to the introduction of a new gold currency for international transactions, the belga of 5 francs, and the country's withdrawal from the monetary union, which ceased to exist at the end of the year. The 1921 monetary union of Belgium and Luxembourg survived and formed the basis for full economic union in 1932.

Like the French franc, the Belgian and Luxembourg francs ceased to exist on 1 January 1999, when they became fixed at 1 EUR = 40.3399 BEF/LUF, thus a Belgian or Luxembourg franc was worth €0.024789. Old franc coins and notes lost their legal tender status on 28 February 2002.

One Luxembourg franc was equal to one Belgian franc. Belgian francs were legal tender inside Luxembourg, and Luxembourg francs were legal tender in the whole of Belgium. (In reality, Luxembourg francs were only accepted as means of payment by shops and businesses in the Belgian province of Luxembourg adjacent to the independent Grand Duchy of Luxembourg, this for historical reasons.)

The equivalent name of the Belgian franc in Dutch and German, Belgium's other official languages, was frank. In Luxembourg the franc was called Frang (plural Frangen) in Luxembourgish.

== Swiss franc and Liechtenstein franc ==
The Swiss franc (ISO code: CHF or 756; German: Franken; Italian: franco), which appreciated significantly against the new European currency from April to September 2000, remains one of the world's strongest currencies, worth as of August 2023 just over one euro. The Swiss franc is used in Switzerland and in Liechtenstein. Liechtenstein retains the ability to mint its own currency, the Liechtenstein franc, which it does from time to time for commemorative or emergency purposes.

The name of the country "Swiss Confederation" is found on some of the coins in Latin (Confoederatio Helvetica), as Switzerland has four official languages, all of which are used on the notes. The denomination is abbreviated "Fr." on the coins which is the abbreviation in all four languages.

== Saar franc ==
The Saar franc, linked at par to the French franc, was introduced in the Saar Protectorate in 1948. On 1 January 1957, the territory joined the Federal Republic of Germany, nevertheless, in its new member state of Saarland, the Saar franc continued to be the currency until 6 July 1959.

The name of the Saar franc in German, the main official language in the Protectorate, was Franken. Coins displaying German inscriptions and the coat of arms of the Protectorate were circulated and used together with French francs. As banknotes, only French franc bills existed.

== Countries that use a franc ==
=== Countries using a franc ===
==== As of 2023 ====
Countries	Currency	ISO 4217 code
Benin	West African CFA franc	XOF
Burkina Faso	West African CFA franc	XOF
Burundi	Burundian franc	BIF
Cameroon	Central African CFA franc	XAF
Central African Republic	Central African CFA franc	XAF
Chad	Central African CFA franc	XAF
Republic of the Congo	Central African CFA franc	XAF
Democratic Republic of the Congo	Congolese franc	CDF
Comoros	Comorian franc	KMF
Djibouti	Djiboutian franc	DJF
Equatorial Guinea	Central African CFA franc	XAF
Gabon	Central African CFA franc	XAF
Guinea	Guinean franc	GNF
Guinea-Bissau	West African CFA franc	XOF
Ivory Coast	West African CFA franc	XOF
Liechtenstein	Swiss franc	CHF
Mali	West African CFA franc	XOF
Niger	West African CFA franc	XOF
Rwanda	Rwandan franc	RWF
Senegal	West African CFA franc	XOF
Switzerland	Swiss franc	CHF
Togo	West African CFA franc	XOF

===== Collectivities franc =====
Countries	Currency	ISO 4217 code
French Polynesia	CFP franc	XPF
New Caledonia	CFP franc	XPF
(France) Wallis and Futuna	CFP franc	XPF

==== Selected obsolete ====
Countries	Former currency	Replaced by	Since
Algeria	Algerian franc	Algerian dinar	1964
Andorra	French franc and Spanish peseta	euro	2002
Belgium	Belgian franc	euro	2002
France (Overseas collectivities)	French franc	euro	2002
Luxembourg	Luxembourgish franc	euro	2002
Madagascar	Malagasy franc	Malagasy ariary	2005
Mauritania	CFA franc	Mauritanian ouguiya	1973
Monaco	French franc and Monégasque franc	euro	2002
Morocco	Moroccan franc	Moroccan dirham	1960
Saar	Saar franc (used from 1947 -1959)	Deutsche Mark	1959
Tunisia	Tunisian franc	Tunisian dinar	1958

== See also ==
- Cape Verdean escudo
- Latin Monetary Union
- The Latverian franc is the currency of the fictional country of Latveria.
- Special settlement currencies
  - UIC franc
  - Gold franc
- Livre tournois (French pound)
- Roman currency
- New Hebrides franc
- Westphalian frank
- Reunion franc
