= Institut d'émission des départements d'outre-mer =

French public financial institution

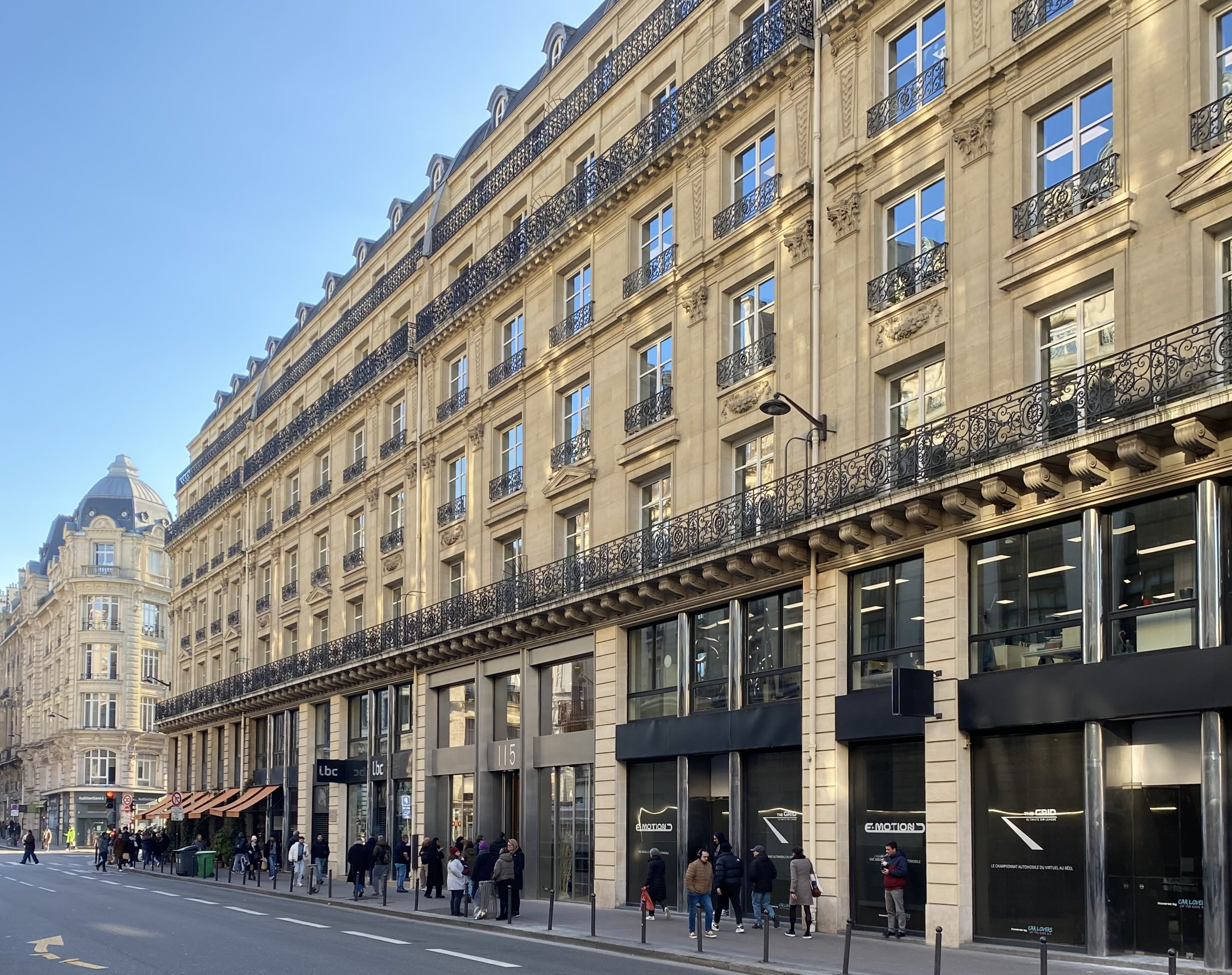
- Building at 115, rue Réaumur in Paris, the head office of IEDOM and IEOM
- Company type: State-owned enterprise
- Industry: Financial services
- Predecessor: Caisse centrale de coopération économique
- Founded: 1959; 67 years ago
- Headquarters: Paris, France
- Area served: Overseas collectivity
- Products: Central banking
- Parent: Bank of France
- Website: www.iedom.fr

The Institut d'émission des départements d'outre-mer (IEDOM, lit. 'Institution of Issue for Overseas Departments') is a French public financial institution based in Paris which serves overseas departments and overseas communities, namely Guadeloupe, Guyana, Martinique, Mayotte, Réunion, Saint Barthélemy, Saint Martin, and Saint-Pierre-et-Miquelon.

Initially established in 1959 as spin-off bank of issue from the Caisse centrale de coopération économique (CCCE), it was gradually brought into the orbit of the Bank of France of which it has been a fully owned subsidiary since 2017. The IEDOM has thus self-described as a "delegated central bank". It is managed jointly with the Institut d'Émission d'Outre-Mer (IEOM), which is still a bank of issue and serves the French Pacific territories.

== History ==
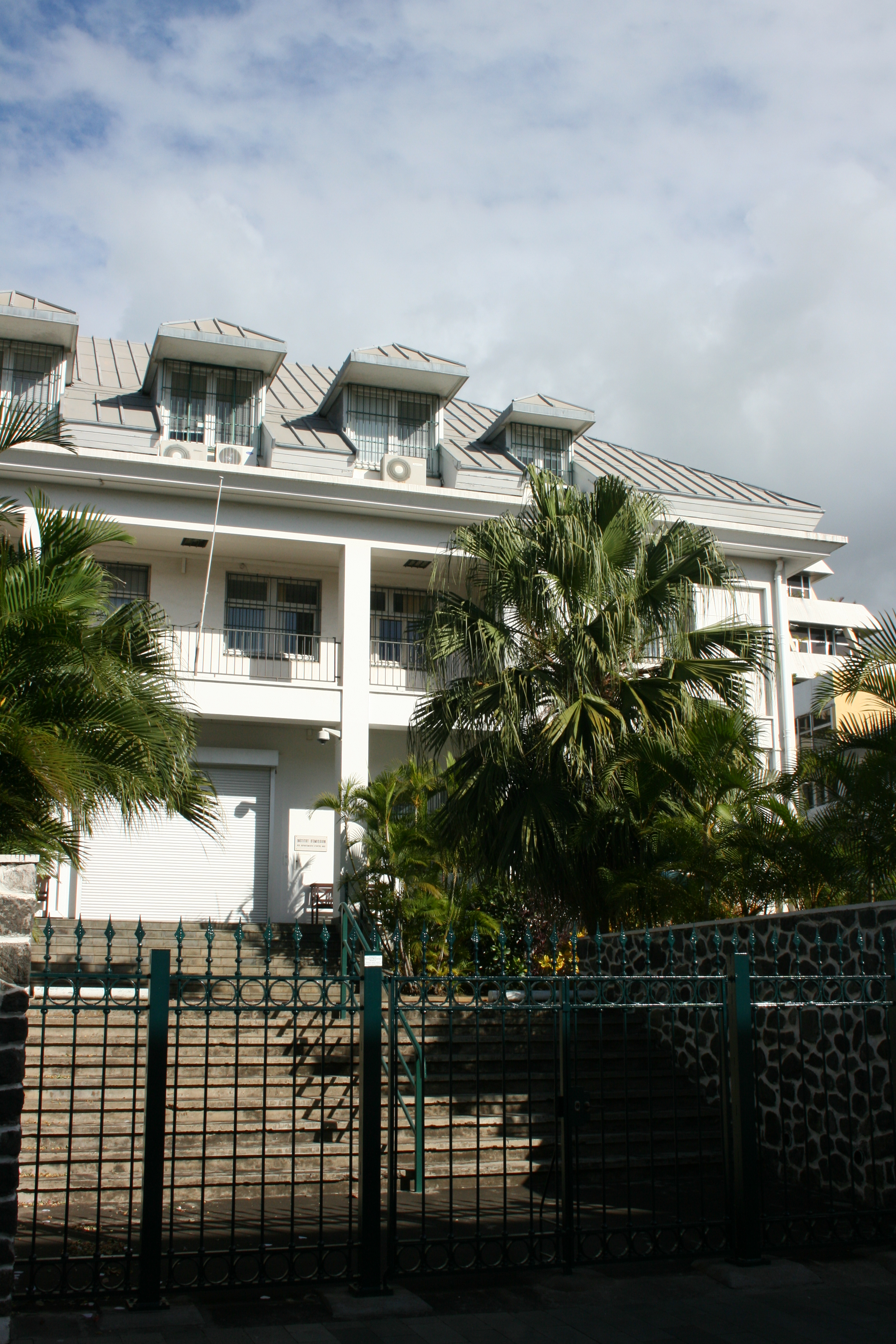
IEDOM branch in Saint-Denis, Réunion

Before World War II, monetary issuance in France's overseas territories was carried out by chartered private banks, namely the Banque de la Guadeloupe in Pointe-à-Pitre, Banque de la Guyane in Cayenne, Banque de la Martinique in Fort-de-France, and Banque de la Réunion in Saint-Denis. Their monetary role was taken over on 1 July 1944 by the Caisse Centrale de la France d'Outre-Mer, renamed in 1958 the Caisse Centrale de Coopération Économique, which issued French francs in Guadeloupe, Guyana and Martinique, and CFA francs in Réunion and also in Saint-Pierre-et-Miquelon.

The IEDOM was spun off from the CCCE in January 1959 to serve Guadeloupe, Guyana, Martinique, and Réunion, still issuing CFA francs in the latter. It was established as a stand-alone government agency under public law (French: établissement public), with human resources and other functional areas managed jointly with the CCCE. On 1 January 1975, the IEDOM ceased to print its own French franc notes and instead distributed the Bank of France's notes; on the same date, the French franc replaced the CFA franc in Réunion. On 1 January 1978, IEDOM extended its scope of activity to Saint-Pierre-et-Miquelon.

In 1998 in preparation for Economic and Monetary Union of the European Union, legislation was enacted to ensure independence of the IEDOM's monetary policy and alignment with the European System of Central Banks. The legislation stipulated that IEDOM would operate "in the name, on behalf of and under the authority of the Bank of France". Later in 1998, its geographical scope was extended to Mayotte, with effect on 1 January 1999. Since then, the chief executive (French: président) of IEDOM has been appointed by the governor of the Bank of France, even though the IEDOM was still managed in a joint framework (French: union économique et sociale) together with the Agence Française de Développement (successor to the CCCE) and the IEOM. Since September 2006, IEDOM and IEOM have shared a single headquarters (siège) in Paris, with integrated management of common functional areas.

In 2016, new legislation complemented the 1998 reform by bringing IEDOM fully into the orbit of the Bank of France. In order to preserve its personnel policies that favor hiring locals in the relevant territories, IEDOM was not fully merged into the Bank of France but instead was purchased by the Bank of France and transformed into a fully owned joint-stock company (French: société par actions simplifiée). This change was endorsed by the European Central Bank as further aligning the French framework with monetary policy independence, and became effective on 1 January 2017.

In May 2018, the seat of IEDOM (and IEOM) was relocated from 164, rue de Rivoli in the Louvre Saint-Honoré building to 115, rue Réaumur in central Paris.

== Leadership ==
- Alain Vienney, Director-General 2007–2008
- Yves Barroux, Director-General 2008–2011
- Nicolas de Sèze, Director-General 2011–2015
- Hervé Gonsard, Director-General 2015–2017
- Marie-Anne Poussin-Delmas, Director-General 2017–2023
- Ivan Odonnat, Director-General since April 2023

== See also ==
- Institut d'Émission
- List of central banks
