= French Camerounian franc =

The franc was the currency of French Cameroun. It was subdivided into 100 centimes and was equal in value to the French franc.

== History ==
Following the occupation of eastern Cameroon by French forces, the French franc was introduced as currency to replace the German mark. This was augmented from 1922 by local issues of paper money and by local coins from 1924. In 1958, the coins of French Equatorial Africa were issued with the name "Cameroun" added to the legend. Since then, the CFA franc of the Equatorial, then Central African States has circulated, first in French Cameroun, then the whole of Cameroon following unification with the British Southern Cameroons.

== Coins ==
In 1924, aluminium-bronze 50 centimes, 1 and 2 francs coins were introduced and were struck until 1926. These were the only coins issued until 1943, when the Free French issued bronze 50 centimes and 1 franc. Aluminium 1 and 2 francs were issued in 1948. The joint coinage of French Equatorial Africa and French Cameroun issued in 1958 included aluminium-bronze coins of 5, 10 and 25 francs.

Since the introduction of the CFA franc, Cameroon has issued 50 francs in 1960, 100 francs since 1966 and 500 francs since 1985.

== Banknotes ==
In 1922, 50 centimes and 1 franc notes were issued by the government. These were the only notes issued specifically for French Cameroun.

In 1961, the Central Bank issued notes in denominations of 1000 and 5000 francs, followed in 1962 by 100, 500 and 10,000 francs. From 1974, the Bank of the Central African States has issued notes in the name of Cameroon.
