= Virtual University of Côte d'Ivoire =

- Université Virtuelle de Côte d'Ivoire
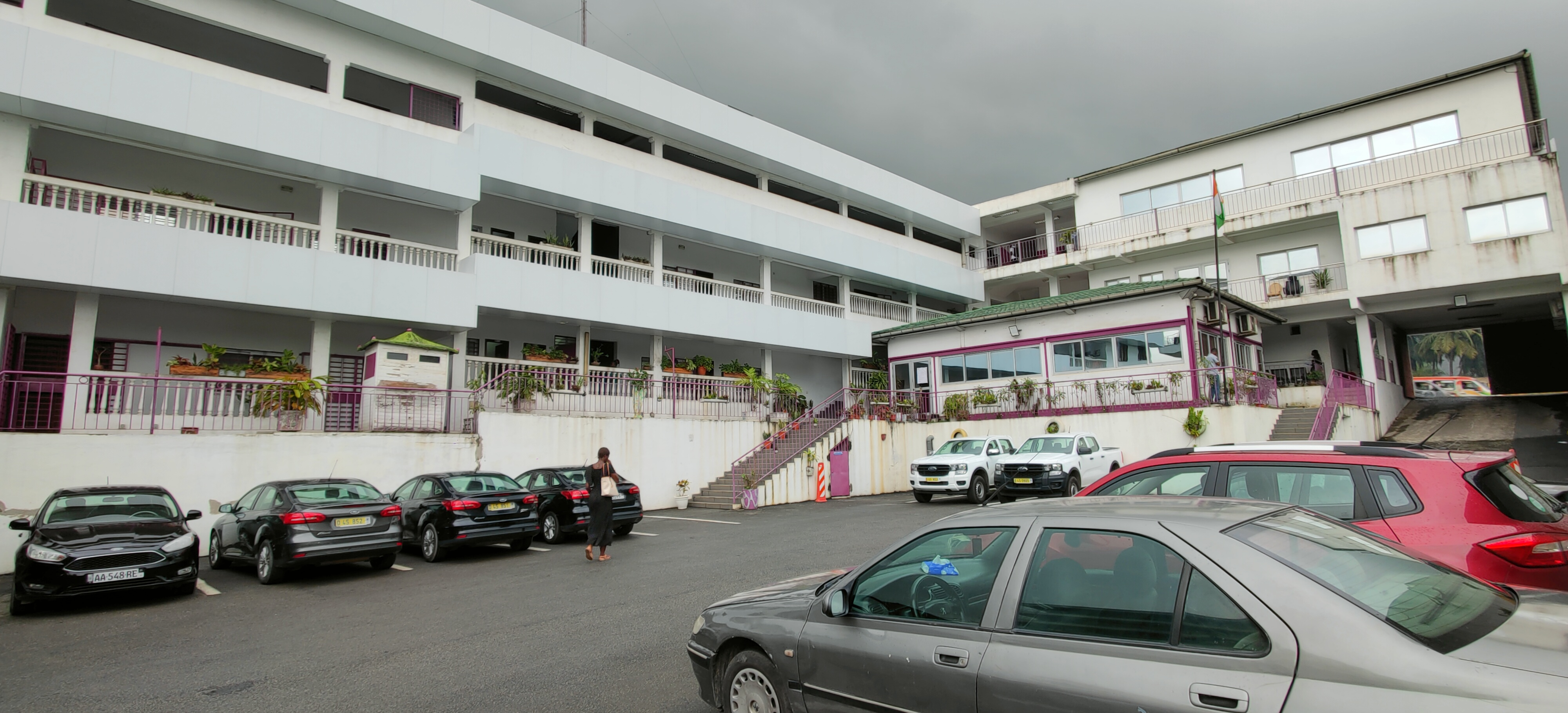
- Image of L'Université Virtuelle de Côte d'Ivoire
- Motto: Mon université avec moi, partout et à tout moment
- Type: Public university
- Established: 2015
- Budget: 20 billion CFA francs
- Students: ~5,000
- Location: Abidjan, Côte d'Ivoire; 5°21′00″N 4°01′00″W
- Language: French
- Website: www.uvci.edu.ci

The Virtual University of Côte d'Ivoire (UVCI) is a public university in Côte d'Ivoire specializing in distance education, located in Abidjan.

Established by decree No. 2015-755 on 09 December 2015 and announced in September 2015, the virtual university was allocated a budget of 20 billion CFA francs, including provision of computers to students and public universities with Wi-Fi equipment. The government aims for this virtual university to address the deficit in higher education in Côte d'Ivoire. The teaching team comprises twelve groups of professors selected through project calls, implementing Massive Open Online Courses (MOOCs).

The Virtual University has demonstrated its ability to collaborate with European Union organizations on current issues and to take regional leadership, as evidenced by the ceremony it organized to distribute books on solar energy to Ivorian universities. In partnership with IT companies such as CISCO, Microsoft, Mediasoft Lafayette, and Orange CI, it offers professional certifications.

== Objectives ==
The university aims to:

- Develop and promote distance learning
- Support institutions offering face-to-face education in developing open distance learning programs
- Promote digital culture.
