= Banque de la Réunion =

Former bank in Réunion, France

- Industry: Financial services
- Founded: 1853
- Defunct: 2015
- Fate: Acquired
- Successor: Caisse d'Épargne Provence Alpes Corse (CEPAC)
- Headquarters: Réunion
- Area served: Réunion
- Products: Bank of issue, banking services

The Banque de la Réunion was a bank of issue on the island of Réunion, France. It was established in 1853, lost its monetary role in 1944, it continued as a commercial bank and in 2015 became a fully owned subsidiary of Caisse d'Épargne Provence Alpes Corse (CEPAC).

== History ==
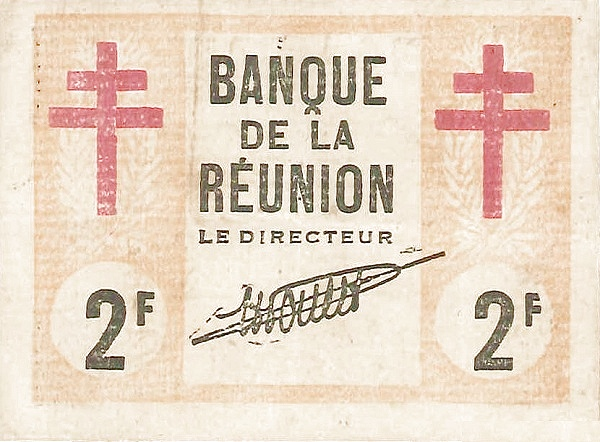
Banknote of the Banque de la Réunion, 1943

The French law of 30 April 1849 that marked the end of slavery in France established (Article 7) "the compensation granted to the colonists following the liberation of slave labor" and stipulated that "One eighth of the portion relating to the colonists of Guadeloupe, Martinique and Réunion will be taken to serve for the establishment of a loan and discount bank in each of these colonies." Two years later, the law of 1 July 1851 mandated that "Each of the banks to which this law relates is authorized, to the exclusion of all other establishments, to issue in each of the colonies where it is established, bearer notes of five hundred, one hundred and twenty-five francs. [...] These notes are repayable on sight, at the headquarters of the bank that issued them. They will be received as legal tender throughout each colony, by the public coffers, as well as by individuals." Like peers such as the Banque de l'Algérie and Banque du Sénégal, the Banque de la Martinique was both a commercial bank and a bank of issue. It opened on 4 July 1853 in Saint-Denis, Réunion, with Jean Desse as its first chief executive (French: directeur) and 10 staff in total. In 1859, it inaugurated a new head office building, known as the Hôtel de la Banque.

The Banque de la Réunion listed on the Paris Stock Exchange on 4 November 1878. It opened a branch in Saint-Pierre on 12 May 1904.

The bank lost its issuance privilege in the turmoil of World War II, when the Caisse Centrale de la France d'Outre-Mer (CCFOM) was designated as monetary authority for the island as well as French Caribbean territories on 1 July 1944. In late 1945, the CFA franc was introduced as the currency of Réunion, and the CCFOM issued it for the island. The Banque de la Réunion survived as a commercial bank.

In 1955, the bank merged with its local peer the Société Bourbonnaise de Crédit, and Crédit Lyonnais took 50 percent of the capital of the combined entity, initially known as Banque de la Réunion et Société Bourbonnaise de Crédit Réunies, reverting a few years later to Banque de la Réunion. By 1994, the bank had 360 employees, 16 branches, and recorded a consolidated balance sheet of 4.9 billion francs, the second-largest on the island with a 17 percent market share.

On 4 December 1998, the Caisse d'Épargne Provence Alpes Corse (CEPAC), a cooperative member bank of Groupe BPCE based in Marseille, took over the Banque de la Réunion by acquiring 52.2 percent of its equity. In 2002, the Banque de la Réunion became part of Financière Océor, which brought together the overseas banks of the Caisse d'Epargne group. In 2005, the bank had 20 branches in Réunion and 3 in Mayotte. In 2009-2010, Financière Océor was restructured following heavy losses and Banque de la Réunion became a majority-owned subsidiary of BPCE IOM, an entity of Groupe BPCE. In 2015, BPCE IOM acquired the shares of Banque de la Réunion which it did not already own and became the bank's full owner, then sold it later that year to CEPAC. The Banque de la Réunion brand was phased out in November 2016.

== See also ==
- Réunion franc
- Banque de l'Indochine
- Banque de Madagascar
- List of banks in France
