= French Guianan franc =

Currency of French Guiana until 2002

The franc was the currency of French Guiana until 2002. The French franc circulated alongside banknotes issued specifically for French Guiana between 1888 and 1961 and notes issued for French Guiana, Guadeloupe and Martinique (collectively referred to as the French Antilles) between 1961 and 1975.

As an integral part of France, French Guiana is part of the European Union and the Eurozone, and starting in 2002, its currency is the euro.

== Banknotes ==
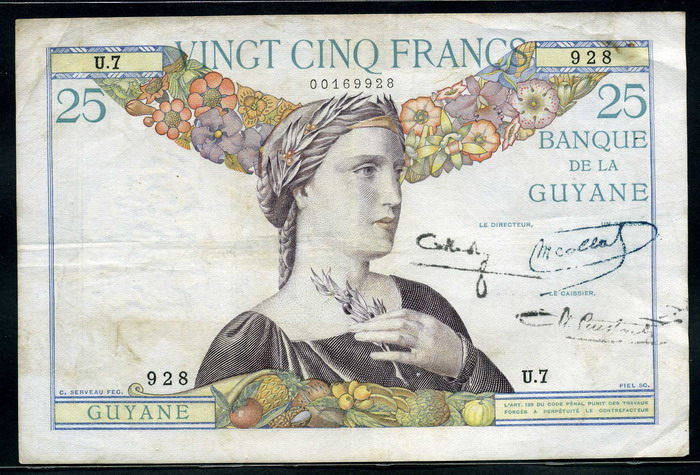
French Guiana 25 Francs

In 1888 the Banque de la Guyane introduced 100 and 500 francs notes, followed by 25 francs in 1910. Emergency issues of 1 and 2 francs notes were made between 1917 and 1919 with regular-type 5 francs notes introduced in 1922. Further emergency issues of 1 and 2 francs were made between 1942 and 1945. 1000 francs notes were introduced in 1942.

In 1941, the Caisse Centrale de la France Libre began issuing paper money, in denominations of 100 and 1000 francs. These were followed, in 1944, by similar notes in the same denominations issued by the Caisse Centrale de la France d'Outre-Mer (CCFOM). In 1947, the CCFOM took over the issuance of all paper notes; 50, 100, 500, 1000 and 5000. These notes shared their designs with the notes issued for Guadeloupe and Martinique.

In 1961, 100, 500, 1000 and 5000 francs notes were overstamped with their values in nouveaux francs (new francs): 1, 5, 10 and 50 nouveaux francs. The same year, a new series of notes was introduced with the names of French Guiana, Guadeloupe and Martinique on them. In 1963, the Institut d'Émission des Départements d'Outre-Mer took over paper money production in the three departments, issuing 10 and 50 nouveaux francs notes. These were followed in 1964 by notes for 5, 10, 50 and 100 francs, the word nouveaux having been dropped.

== See also ==
- Guadeloupe franc
- Martinique franc
- Economy of French Guiana
