= Centime =

Fraction currency in several Francophone countries

20 French Centime with Marianne on Obverse.
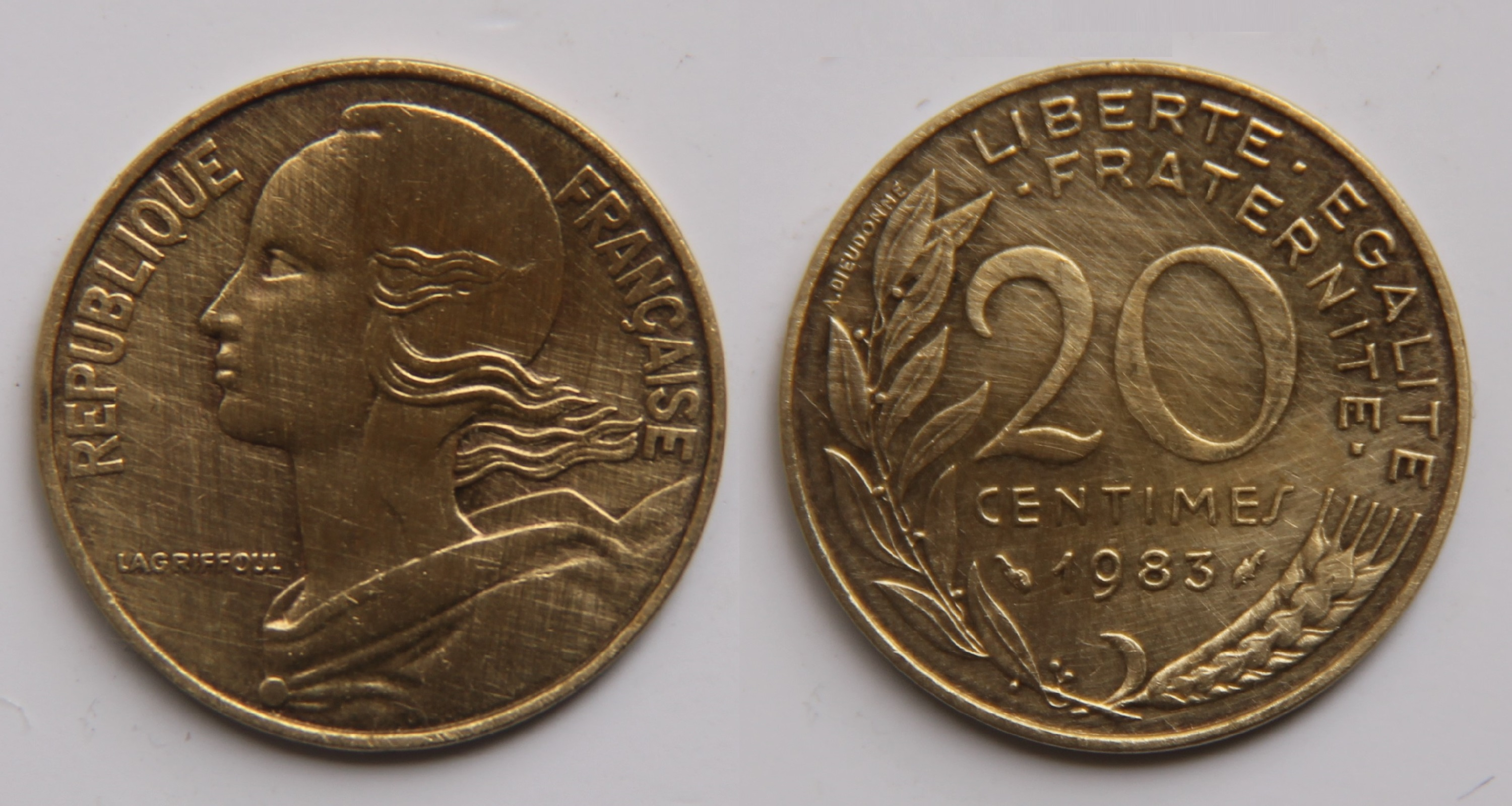
First side of the image: Obverse: Marianne wearing the Phrygian cap of liberty.
Second side of the image: Reverse: Face value and French motto: "Liberté, égalité, fraternité".
This coin was minted from 1962 to 2001.

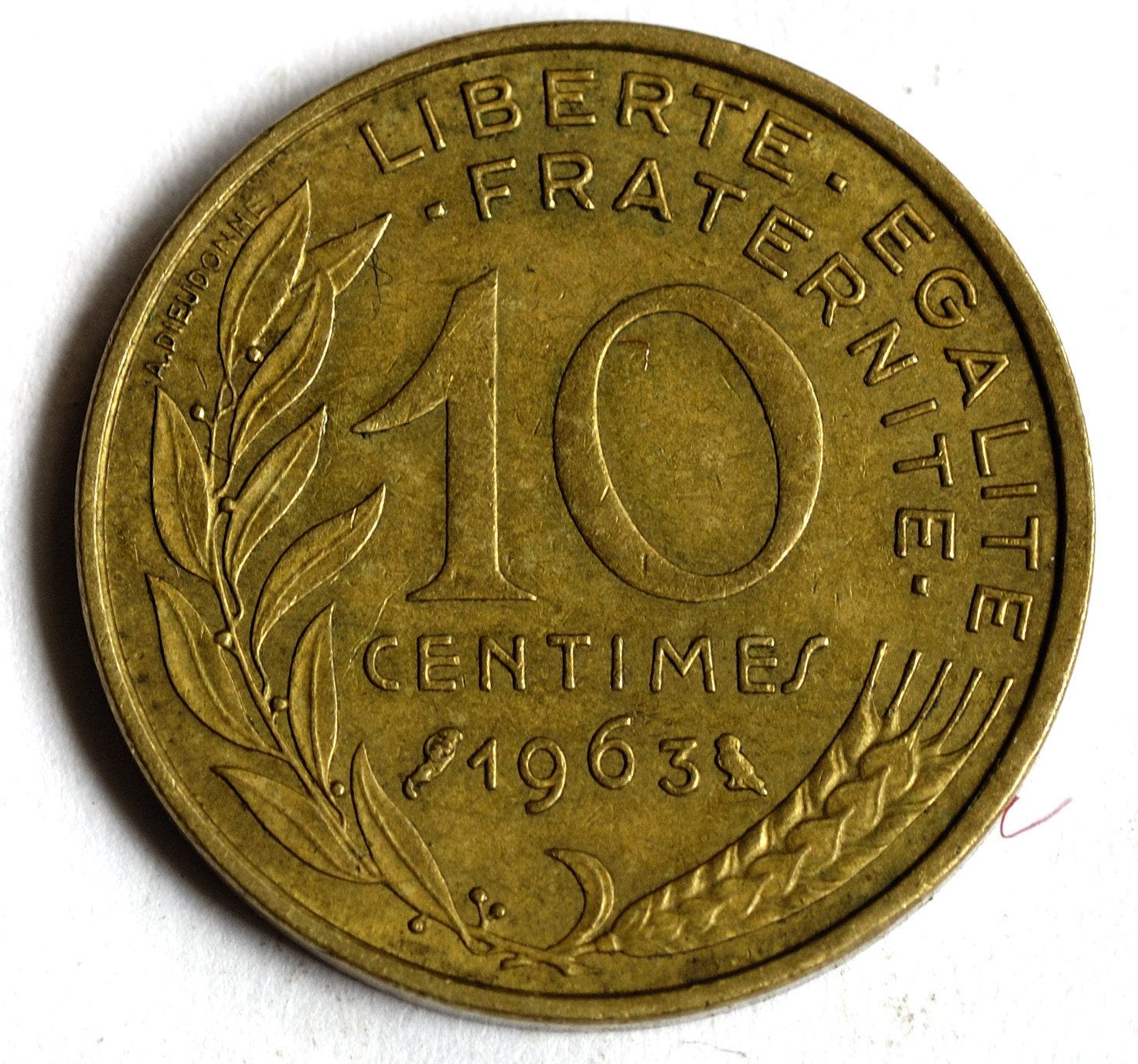
10 French centimes (1963)

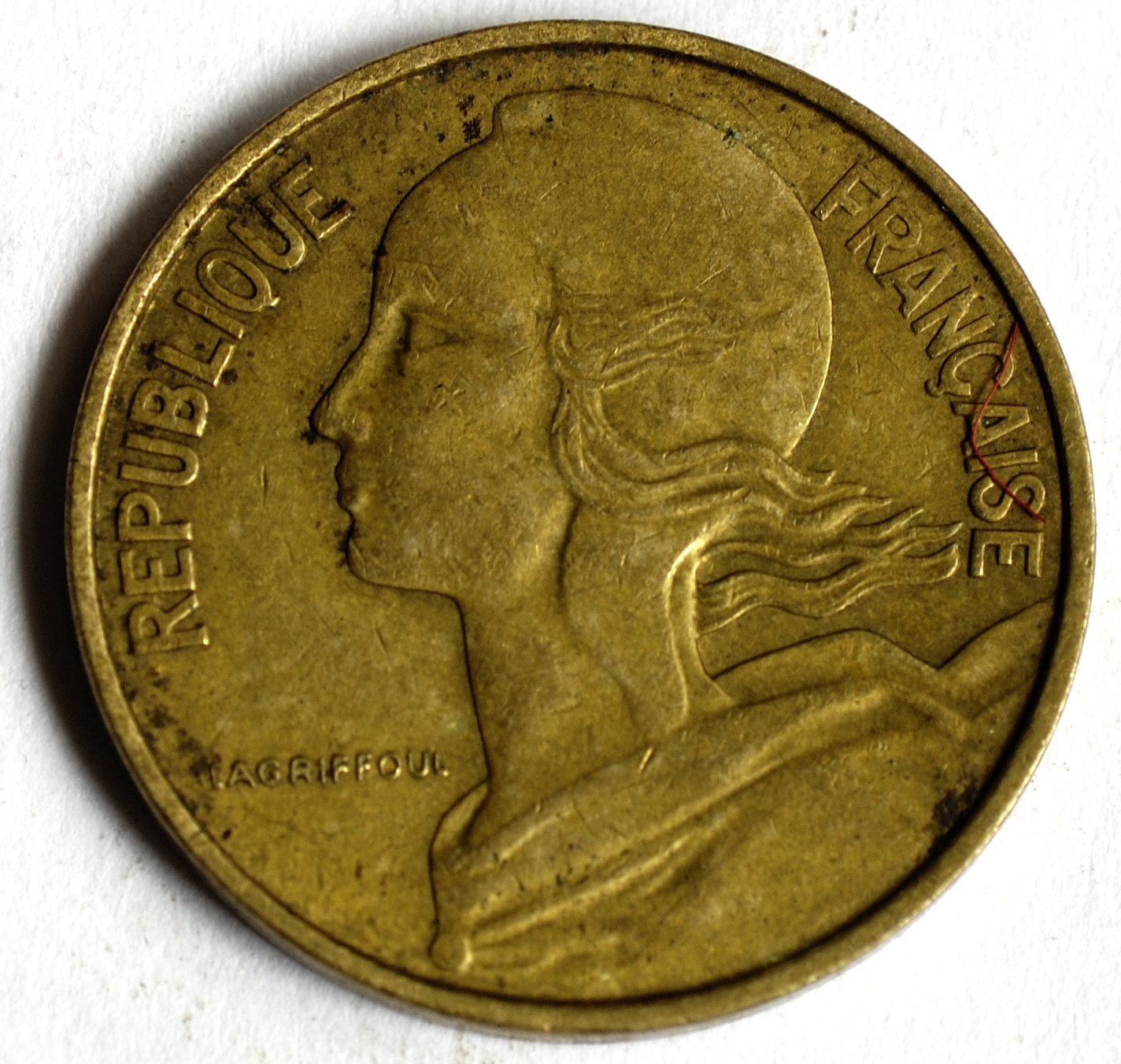
10 French centimes (1963)

A centime (from Latin: centesimus) is a fractional monetary unit. It equals one-hundredth of a franc in Switzerland, one-hundredth of a dinar in Algeria, and one-hundredth of a dirham in Morocco. It was formerly worth one-hundredth of a franc in other Francophone countries, such as Belgium and France, until the adoption of the euro.

In France, the usage of centime goes back to the introduction of the decimal monetary system under Napoleon. This system aimed at replacing non-decimal fractions of older coins. A five-centime coin was known as a sou, i.e. a solidus or shilling.

In Francophone Canada 1/100 of a Canadian dollar is officially known as a cent (pronounced /sɛnt/) in both English and French. However, in practice, the form of cenne (pronounced /sɛn/) has completely replaced the official cent. Spoken and written use of the official form cent in Francophone Canada is exceptionally uncommon. In the Canadian French vernacular sou, sou noir (noir means "black" in French), cenne, and cenne noire are all widely known, used, and accepted monikers when referring to either 1/100 of a Canadian dollar or the 1¢ coin (colloquially known as a "penny" in North American English).

== Subdivision of euro ==
In the European community, cent is the official name for one hundredth of a euro. However, in French-speaking countries, the word centime is the preferred term. The Superior Council of the French language of Belgium recommended in 2001 the use of centime, since cent is also the French word for "hundred". An analogous decision was published in the Journal officiel in France (2 December 1997).

In Morocco, dirhams are divided into 100 centimes and one may find prices in the country quoted in centimes rather than in dirhams. Sometimes centimes are known as francs or, in former Spanish areas, pesetas.

== Usage ==
A centime is one-hundredth of the following basic monetary units:

=== Current ===
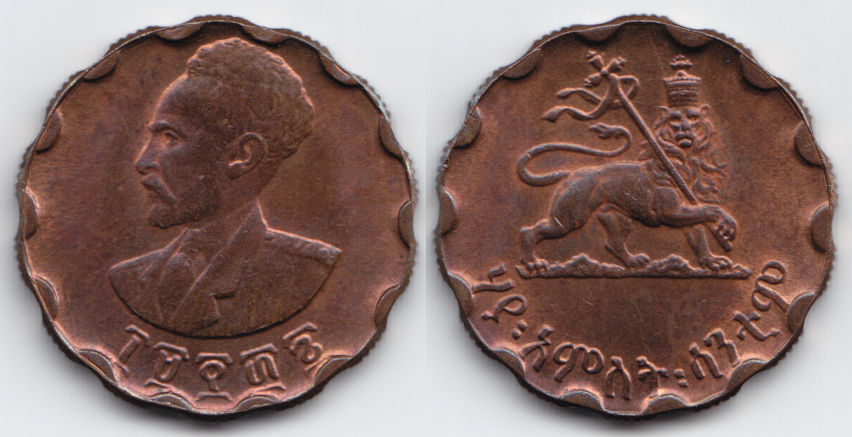
Ethiopia, 25 centimes 1944

- Algerian dinar
- Burundian franc
- CFP franc
- CFA franc
- Comorian franc
- Congolese franc
- Djiboutian franc
- Ethiopian birr (as santim)
- Guinean franc
- Haitian gourde
- Moroccan dirham
- Rwandan franc
- Swiss franc (by French and English speakers only; Italian speakers use centesimo. See Rappen)

=== Obsolete ===
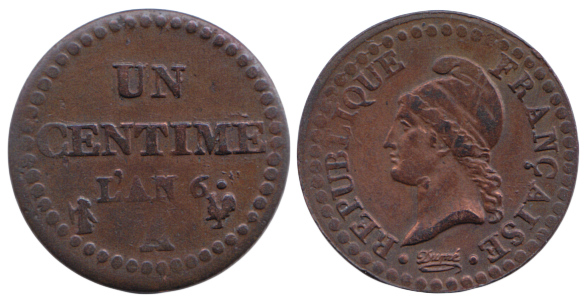
Centime 1797–98, French First Republic. First year of release.

- Algerian franc
- Belgian franc (Dutch: centiem)
- Cambodian franc
- French Camerounian franc
- French Guianan franc
- French franc
- Guadeloupe franc
- Katangese franc
- Latvian lats (Latvian: santīms)
- Luxembourgish franc
- Malagasy franc
- Malian franc
- Martinique franc
- Monégasque franc
- Moroccan franc
- New Hebrides franc
- Réunion franc
- Spanish Peseta
- Tunisian franc
- Westphalian frank
