= Malian franc =

Historical currency of Mali (1962 - 1984)

franc malien (French)

ISO 4217
- Code: MLF

Unit
- Symbol: MAF

Denominations
- Subunit
- 1/100: centime
- Banknotes: 50, 100, 500, 1000, 5000, 10,000 francs
- Coins: 5, 10, 25, 50, 100 francs

Demographics
- Date of introduction: 1962
- Replaced: West African CFA franc (1 XOF = 1 MLF)
- Date of withdrawal: 1984
- Replaced by: West African CFA franc (2 MLF = 1 XOF)
- User(s): Mali

Issuance
- Central bank: Central Bank of Mali

Valuation
- Pegged with: French franc = 100 Malian francs
- This infobox shows the latest status before this currency was rendered obsolete.

The Malian franc was the independent currency of Mali between 1962 and 1984. Although technically subdivided into 100 centimes, no subdivisions were issued.

== History ==
Until 1962, Mali used the West African CFA franc. The Malian franc was introduced that year at par with the CFA franc, but devalued relative to it in 1967 due to greater inflation in the country than had occurred in the CFA franc zone. In 1984, Mali readopted the CFA franc, with 2 Malian francs = 1 CFA franc.

=== Exchange rates ===
- 1 July 1962 to 4 May 1967: Peg with the French franc (1 MLF = 0.02 FRF = 1 XOF).
- 5 May 1967 to 31 May 1984: Devalued by 50% (1 MLF = 0.01 FRF = 0.50 XOF) due to greater inflation in Mali than in countries using the CFA franc.

On 1 June 1984, Mali readopted the CFA franc, worth two Malian francs.

== Coins ==
In 1962, aluminium coins were issued (dated 1961) in denominations of 5, 10 and 25 francs. A second issue of aluminium and nickel-brass were issued between 1975 and 1977 in denominations of aluminium 10, 25, nickel-brass 50 and 100 francs coins.

== Banknotes ==
Banknotes dated 22 SEPTEMBRE 1960 were issued by the Banque de la République du Mali (Bank of the Republic of Mali) in 1962 in denominations of 50, 100, 500, 1,000 and 5,000 francs. A second issue with new designs were issued in 1967 in the same denominations as the previous series. Following Modibo Keita's overthrow on 19 November 1968, the Banque Centrale du Mali (Central Bank of Mali) was established, and took over note production with the 1971 introduction of a third series of 100, 500, 1000, 5000 and 10,000 francs notes.

Preceded by: CFA franc Reason: independence Ratio: at par	Currency of Mali; 1962 – 1984	Succeeded by: West African CFA franc Reason: rejoining in the monetary union Ratio: 1 CFA franc = 2 Malian francs
