= Banque de la Guyane =

Former bank in French Guiana

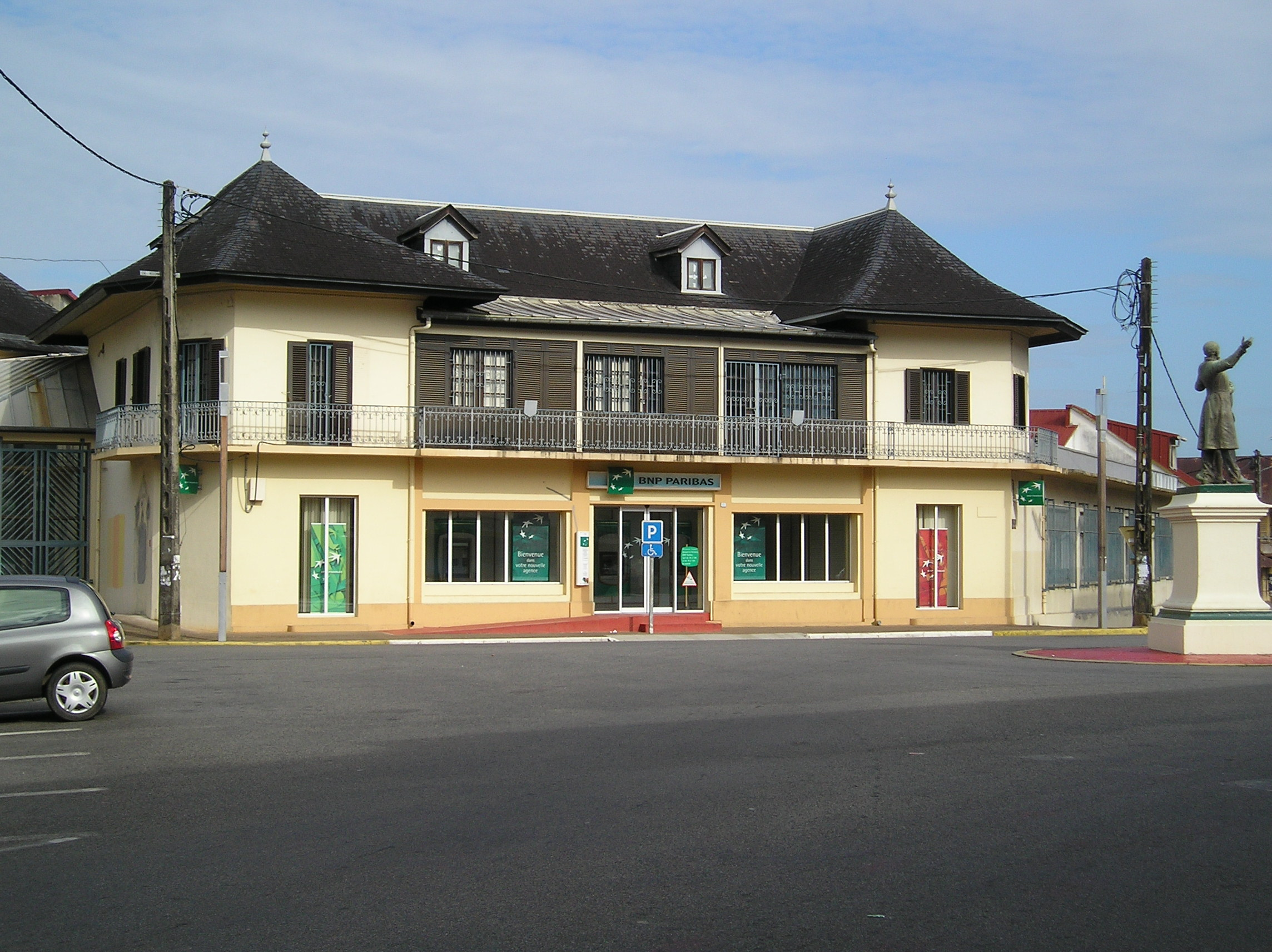
- Head office building on Place Victor-Schoelcher, Cayenne, with Schoelcher's statue on the right
- Industry: Financial services
- Founded: 1855
- Defunct: 1964
- Fate: Acquired
- Successor: Banque Nationale pour le Commerce et l'Industrie (BNCI)
- Headquarters: Cayenne, French Guiana
- Area served: French Guiana
- Products: Bank of issue, banking services

The Banque de la Guyane was a bank of issue in the territory of French Guiana. It was established in 1855, lost its monetary role in 1944, continued as a commercial bank and was rebranded as BNP Paribas in 2000.

== History ==
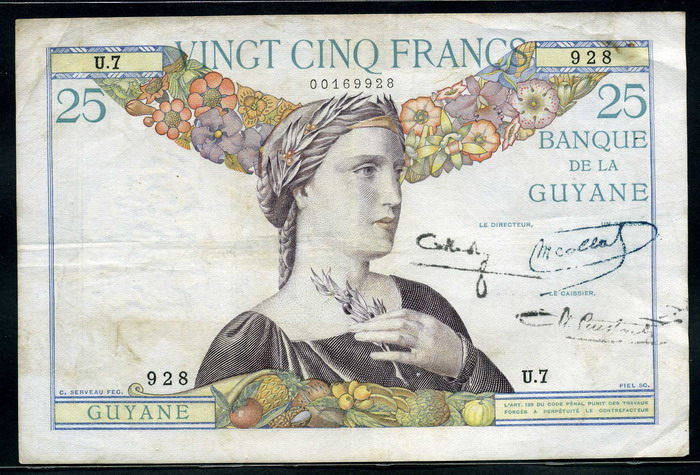
Banknote of the Banque de la Guyane, second quarter of the 20th century

Like peers such as the Banque de l'Algérie and Banque du Sénégal, the Banque de la Guyane was both a commercial bank and a bank of issue. It opened in 1855, with head office in Cayenne. Its first chief executive (French: directeur) was Jean-Baptiste Bellamy, who in 1857 moved on to head the Banque de la Martinique.

In the 1890s, the bank erected a new head office building in central Cayenne, which was remodeled in 1975. In 1920, the bank opened a branch in Saint-Laurent-du-Maroni.

The bank lost its issuance privilege in the turmoil of World War II, when the Caisse Centrale de la France d'Outre-Mer (CCFOM) was designated as monetary authority for the island and other French Caribbean territories on 1 July 1944. In practice, the Banque de la Guyane kept issuing the French Guianan franc until 1952 by delegation of the CCFOM. It remained in activity as a commercial bank, the only one in French Guiana until the Banque Française Commerciale opened there in the late 1970s. In 1964, it came under the control of the Banque Nationale pour le Commerce et l'Industrie (BNCI), which became Banque Nationale de Paris (BNP) in 1966 then BNP Paribas in 2000.

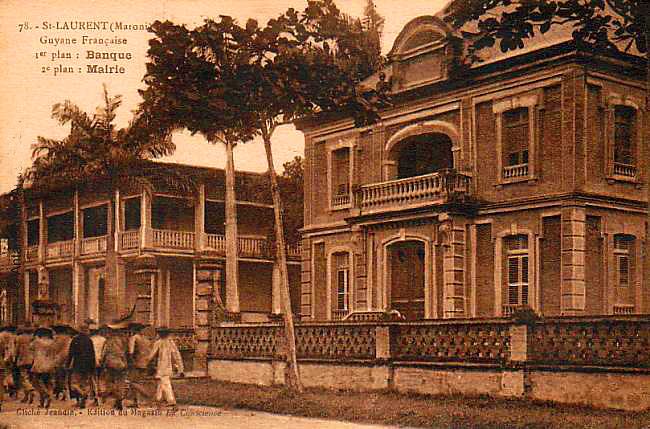
Branch of the bank in Saint-Laurent-du-Maroni (right), 1920s postcard

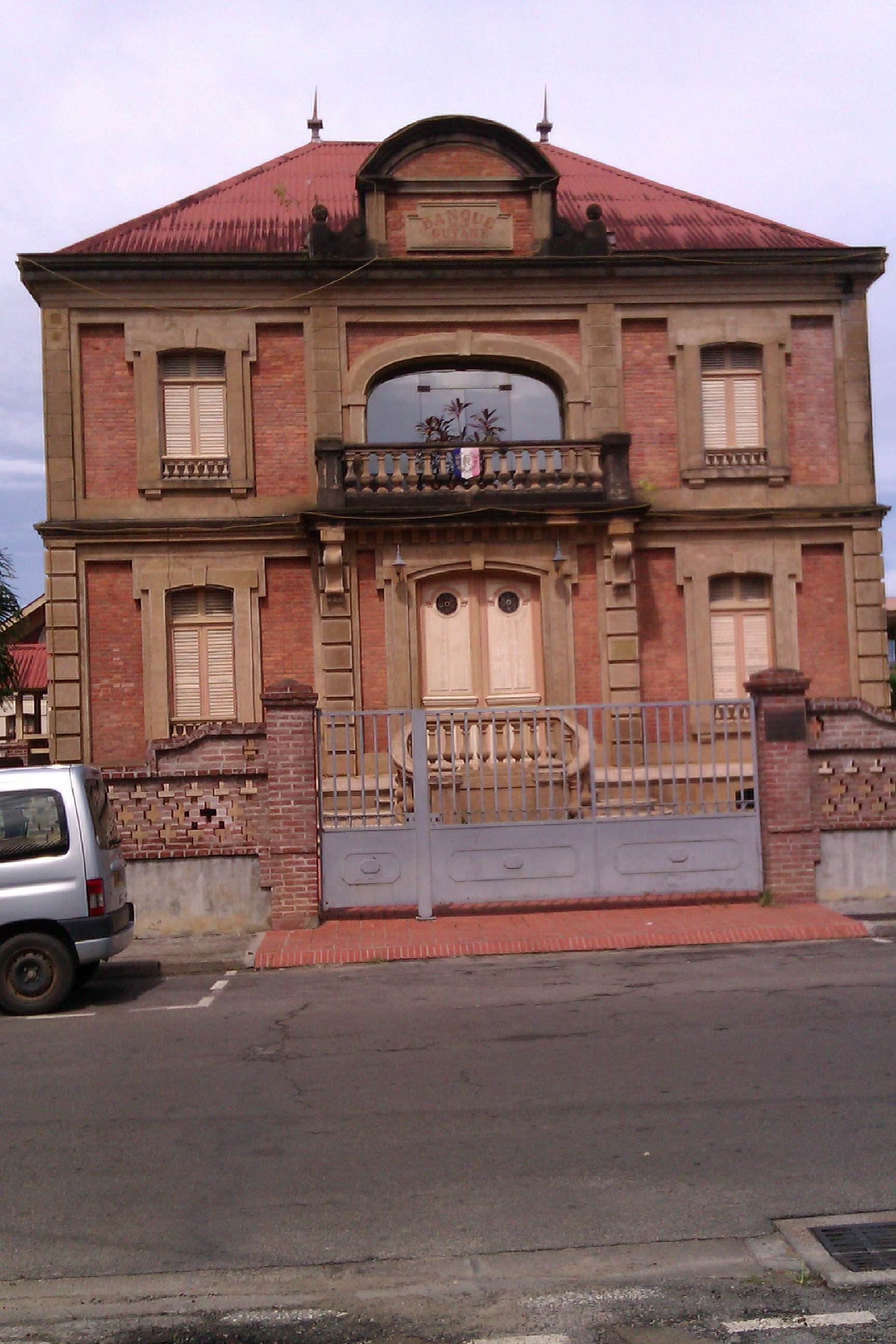
The same building in 2011

== See also ==
- French Guianan franc
- Banque de l'Indochine
- Banque de Madagascar
- List of banks in France
