= Réunion franc =

Currency of Reunion

The franc was the currency of Réunion until 1999. Before 1975, Réunion had its own franc, distinct from that of France. After 1975, the French franc circulated. Réunion now uses the euro. The Réunion franc was subdivided into 100 centimes.

== History ==
The French franc circulated on Réunion alone (except for a single coin issue) until 1874, when distinct issues of currency commenced. Initially, notes of the Banque de la Réunion and the Colonial Treasury circulated alongside French currency. In 1896, coins were issued, followed by bank tokens in 1920. In 1945, the CFA franc was created and was adopted in Réunion, with distinct coins introduced in 1948. Although Réunion's paper money was stamped with the equivalent value in new francs from 1960, the new franc did not replace the Réunion franc until 1975, when French currency replaced Réunion's at a rate of 1 French (new) franc = 50 Réunion (CFA) francs.

== Coins ==
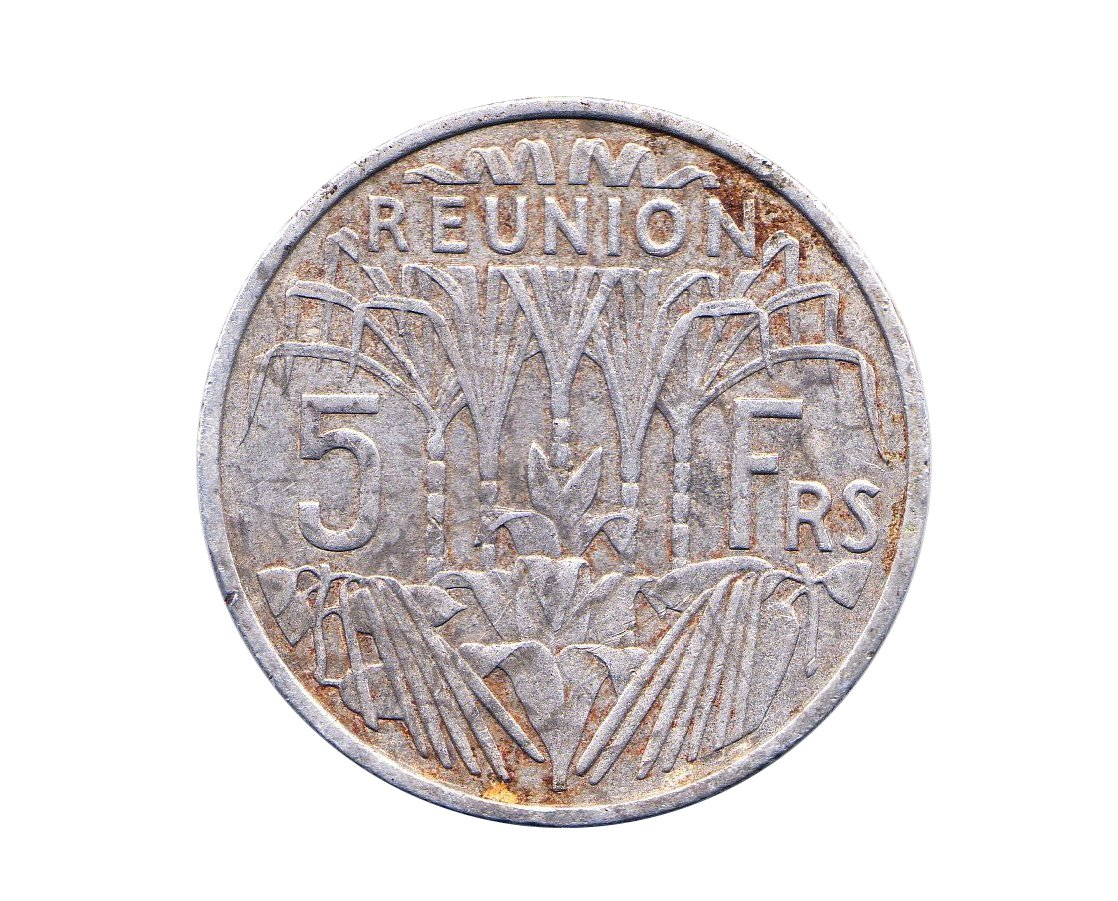
5 Francs coin of 1955

- 1779/80 - 3 sols "Isles de France et de Bourbon"
- 1781 - 3 sous "Isles de France et de Bourbon"
- 1816, billon 10 centimes were struck in the name of the Isle de Bourbon (as Réunion was then known). In 1896, cupro-nickel 50 centimes and 1 franc coins were issued.
- 1920, aluminium 5, 10 and 25 centime bank tokens were issued, which circulated until 1941.
- 1948, aluminium 1 and 2 francs coins were introduced
- 1955 aluminium 5 francs and aluminium-bronze 10 and 20 francs.
- 1962 and 1964 Nickel 50 and 100 francs.

All denominations were issued until 1975.

Coins of the Réunion franc
Image	Value	Technical parameters				Description			Date of minting
Image	Value	Diameter	Thickness	Mass	Composition	Edge	Obverse	Reverse	Date of minting
	1 franc	23 mm	1.6 mm	1.3 grams	Aluminum	Plain/Smooth	Profile of Marianne with four ships in the background	Sugar cane plants dividing the denomination	1948-1973
	2 francs	27 mm	2.03 mm	2.2 grams	Aluminum	Plain/Smooth	Profile of Marianne with four ships in the background	Sugar cane plants dividing the denomination	1948-1973
	5 francs	30 mm		3.5 grams	Aluminum	Plain/Smooth	Profile of Marianne with four ships in the background	Sugar cane plants dividing the denomination	1948-1973
	10 francs	20 mm		3.0 grams	Aluminum-bronze	Plain/Smooth	Profile of Marianne with four ships in the background	Crowned shield (coat of arms of Saint-Denis de la Réunion) dividing the denomination	1955-1964
	10 francs	20 mm		3.0 grams	Aluminum-nickel-bronze	Plain/Smooth	Profile of Marianne with four ships in the background	Crowned shield (coat of arms of Saint-Denis de la Réunion) dividing the denomination	1969-1973
	20 francs	23.5 mm	1.3 mm	4.0 grams	Aluminum-bronze	Plain/Smooth	Profile of Marianne with four ships in the background	Crowned shield (coat of arms of Saint-Denis de la Réunion) dividing the denomination	1955-1964
	20 francs	20 mm		3.0 grams	Aluminum-nickel-bronze	Plain/Smooth	Profile of Marianne with four ships in the background	Crowned shield (coat of arms of Saint-Denis de la Réunion) dividing the denomination	1969-1973
	50 francs	24 mm		6.0 grams	Nickel	Reeded/grained	Profile of Marianne with four ships in the background	Crowned shield (coat of arms of Saint-Denis de la Réunion) dividing the denomination	1962-1973
	100 francs	26.5 mm	1.96 mm	8.54 grams	Nickel	Reeded/grained	Profile of Marianne with four ships in the background	Crowned shield (coat of arms of Saint-Denis de la Réunion) dividing the denomination	1964-1973

== Banknotes ==
The Banque de la Réunion introduced notes for 5, 10, 25, 100 and 500 francs between 1873 and 1876. Between 1884 and 1886, the Colonial Treasury (Trésor Colonial) issued notes for 50 centimes, 1, 2 and 3 francs.

In 1917, the Banque de la Réunion issued emergency small change notes for 5 and 10 centimes. The Bank introduced 1000 francs notes in 1937 and 5000 francs in 1940. During the Second World War, the Bank issued 50 centimes, 1 and 2 francs notes, first under the auspices of Vichy France, then of the Free French. The Banque de la Réunion ceased note issuing in 1944.

In 1943, the Caisse Centrale de la France Libre issued 5, 100 and 1000 francs notes of the same type as issued in French Equatorial Africa for use in Réunion. In 1944, the Caisse Centrale de la France d'Outre-Mer (CCFOM) issued 100 and 1000 francs notes in the same way. In 1947, the CCFOM issued French Equatorial African notes for 5, 10, 20, 50, 100, 500, 1000 and 5000 francs overprinted with "La Réunion".

In 1962, the Institut d'Émission des Départements d'Outre-Mer took over paper money issue, with notes for 100, 500, 1000 and 5000 francs, overprinted with either "La Réunion" or "Département de la Réunion". In 1960, 500 1000 and 5000 francs notes were issued overprinted with the denomination in new francs (10, 20 and 100 nouveaux francs).

== See also ==
- CFA franc

Preceded by: None	Currency of Réunion; 1920 – 1975	Succeeded by: French franc Reason: Withdrawal of the Réunion franc from circulation, and replacing it with circulating coins and banknotes of the New French franc. Ratio: 1 New French franc = 50 Réunion (CFA) francs

Preceded by: French franc Reason: Withdrawal of the Réunion franc from circulation, and replacing it with circulating coins and banknotes of the New French franc. Ratio: 1 New French franc = 50 Réunion (CFA) francs	Currency of Réunion; 1975 – 2002	Succeeded by: Euro; Reason: Introduction of the Euro as legal tender throughout the European Union, which is also applied to the French overseas department of Réunion.
