= Banque de la Guadeloupe =

Former bank in Guadeloupe, France

- Industry: Financial services, bank of issue
- Founded: 30 April 1849
- Defunct: 1967
- Fate: Merged
- Successor: Banque des Antilles Françaises (BDAF)
- Headquarters: Guadeloupe
- Products: Issuing banknotes, banking services

The Banque de la Guadeloupe was a bank of issue on the island of Guadeloupe, France. It was established in 1853, lost its monetary role in 1944, and merged in 1967 with the Banque de la Martinique to form the Banque des Antilles Françaises (BDAF).

== History ==
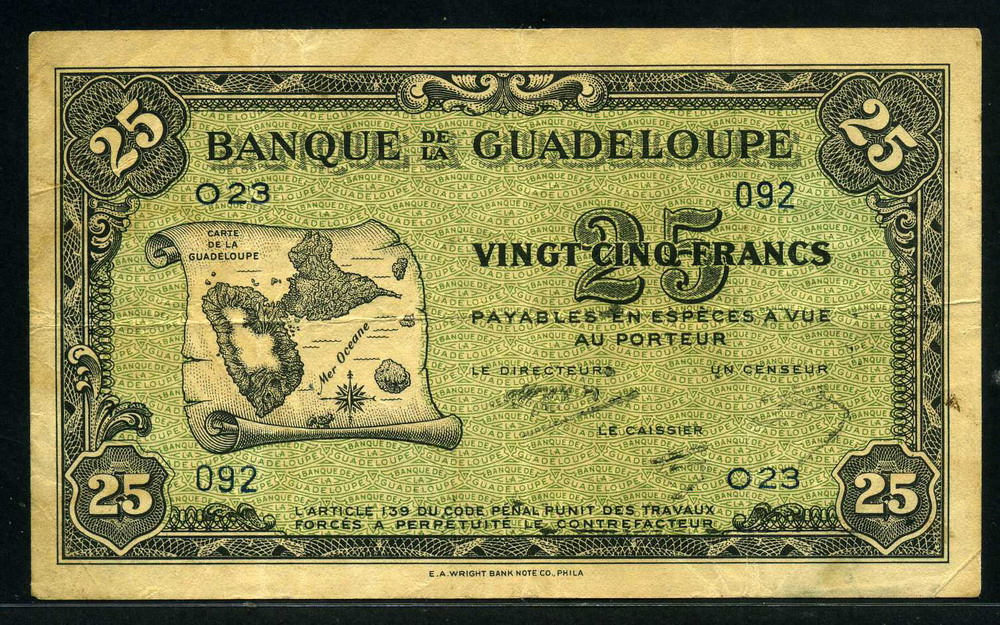
Banknote of the Banque de la Guadeloupe printed in Philadelphia, 1942

The Second French Republic enacted legislation on 11 July 1851 that created a framework for the establishment of colonial banks, partly as a response to the economic consequences of the end of slavery in France in 1848. Like peers such as the Banque de l'Algérie and Banque du Sénégal, it was both a commercial bank and a bank of issue. In correspondence with the Comptoir National d'Escompte de Paris in mainland France, the bank was long controlled by the dominant local group of white creole businesspeople known as usiniers as they controlled the sugar factories (French: usines à sucre) that were the core of the island's economy.

The bank lost its issuance privilege in the turmoil of World War II, when the Caisse Centrale de la France d'Outre-Mer (CCFOM) was designated as monetary authority for the island and other French Caribbean territories on 1 July 1944. In practice, the Banque de la Guadeloupe kept issuing the Guadeloupe franc until 1952 by delegation of the CCFOM. It remained in activity as a commercial bank.

In 1967, the Banque de la Guadeloupe merged with its peer in Martinique and with Union-Banque.

In stages between 2014 and 2016, the BDAF was taken over by the Caisse d'Épargne Provence Alpes Corse (CEPAC), a cooperative member bank of Groupe BPCE based in Marseille, of which it became a fully owned subsidiary.

== See also ==
- Guadeloupe franc
- Banque de l'Indochine
- Banque de Madagascar
- List of banks in France
