= Westphalian frank =

Former currency of the Kingdom of Westphalia

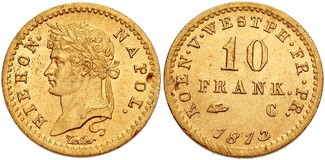
A gold 10 Franken coin

The Westphalian frank was a currency of the Kingdom of Westphalia between 1808 and 1813. It circulated alongside the Thaler, was equal to the French franc, and was subdivided into 100 Centimen.

The currency was dissolved upon being recaptured by Prussian forces and its allies in the Napoleonic Wars in 1813.
