= Banque de la Martinique =

Former bank in Martinique, France

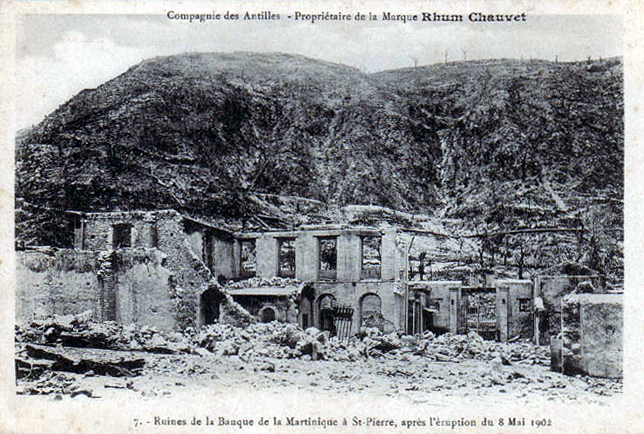
Ruined head office of the Banque de la Martinique, 1902

The Banque de la Martinique was a bank of issue on the island of Martinique, France. It was established in 1853, lost its monetary role in 1944, and merged in 1967 with the Banque de la Guadeloupe to form the Banque des Antilles Françaises (BDAF).

== Overview ==
The French law of 30 April 1849 that marked the end of slavery in France established (Article 7) "the compensation granted to the colonists following the liberation of slave labor" and stipulated that "One eighth of the portion relating to the colonists of Guadeloupe, Martinique and Réunion will be taken to serve for the establishment of a loan and discount bank in each of these colonies." Two years later, the law of 1 July 1851 mandated that "Each of the banks to which this law relates is authorized, to the exclusion of all other establishments, to issue in each of the colonies where it is established, bearer notes of five hundred, one hundred and twenty-five francs. [...] These notes are repayable on sight, at the headquarters of the bank that issued them. They will be received as legal tender throughout each colony, by the public coffers, as well as by individuals." Like peers such as the Banque de l'Algérie and Banque du Sénégal, the Banque de la Martinique was both a commercial bank and a bank of issue. It opened in 1853, with its first branch in Saint-Pierre opposite the town hall.

The 1902 eruption of Mount Pelée devastated the city of Saint-Pierre and destroyed the bank's head office building, even though its gold and cash reserves were left intact in the basement. The head office was thus relocated to Fort-de-France.

The bank lost its issuance privilege in the turmoil of World War II, when the Caisse Centrale de la France d'Outre-Mer (CCFOM) was designated as monetary authority for the island and other French Caribbean territories on 1 July 1944. In practice, the Banque de la Martinique kept issuing the Martinique franc until 1952 by delegation of the CCFOM. It remained in activity as a commercial bank.

In 1967, the Banque de la Martinique merged with its peer in Guadeloupe and with Union-Banque into the BDAF.

In stages between 2014 and 2016, the BDAF was taken over by the Caisse d'Épargne Provence Alpes Corse (CEPAC), a cooperative member bank of Groupe BPCE based in Marseille, of which it became a fully owned subsidiary.

== Leadership ==
- Octave Danican-Philidor, Director 1874 - 1879
- Adolphe Trillard, Director 1879 - 1900
- Gustave Alizard, Director 1900 - 1920
- Charles Dinslage, Director 1920 - 1929
- René Didellot, Director 1929 - 1944
- Charles Garcin, Director 1944 - 1945

== See also ==
- Martinique franc
- Banque de l'Indochine
- Banque de Madagascar
- List of banks in France
