= Caisse centrale de la France libre =

Former French public financial institution

- Successor: Institut d'émission des départements d'outre-mer

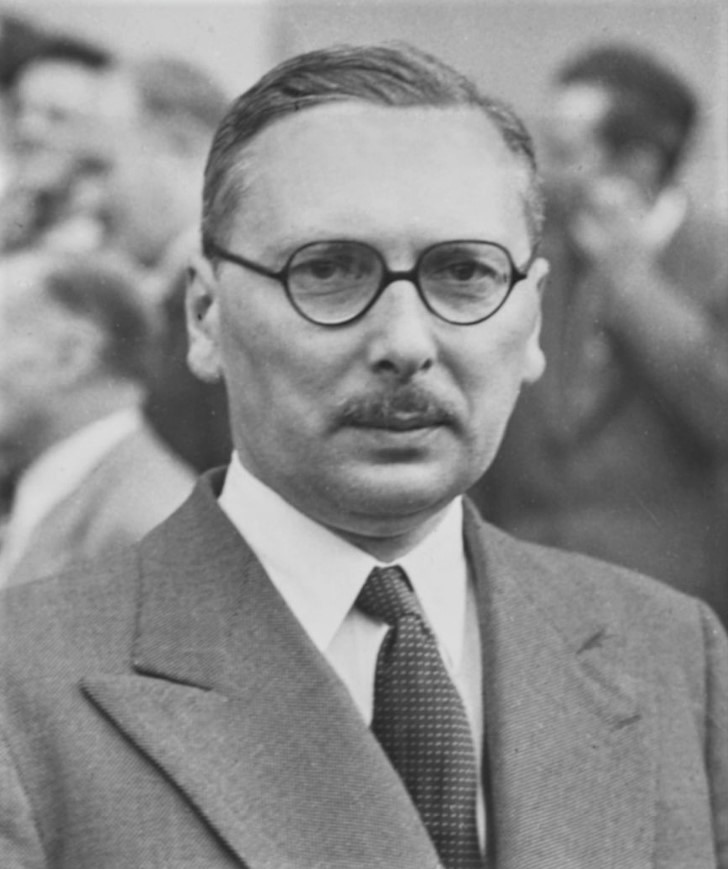
René Pleven (1901-1993) was the founding chairman of CCFL

The Caisse centrale de la France libre (CCFL, lit. 'Central Bank of Free France') was a bank of issue established by Free France in London in 1941, serving French Equatorial Africa and Cameroon following their de facto secession from Vichy France. It soon evolved into a specialized note-issuing and development bank for French overseas territories and was renamed the Caisse centrale de la France d'outre-Mer (CCFOM, lit. 'Central Bank of Overseas France') in early 1944, then the Caisse centrale de coopération économique (CCCE, lit. 'Central Fund for Economic Cooperation') in 1958.

It was the predecessor institution of the Bank of Central African States (BEAC), France's Institut d'Émission des Départements d'Outre-Mer (IEDOM) and French Development Agency (AFD), and national development banks in several African countries.

== Background ==
In late August 1940, the initiative of Félix Éboué rallied French Equatorial Africa and Cameroon to Charles de Gaulle's Free France, whereas French West Africa remained loyal to Vichy. The Vichy government consequently terminated the note-issuing privilege of the Banque de l'Afrique occidentale (BAO) over the rebel territories. In March 1941, the British authorities established a fixed exchange rate between the pound sterling and the French francs circulating in Free France's African lands in the form of BAO notes, similarly to the policy they had adopted two months earlier for the Congo franc. As this situation was plainly unsustainable in the absence of a counterpart bank of issue, the Bank of England started working with De Gaulle's financial aide in London, Pierre Denis, to establish a dedicated monetary authority.

== Caisse centrale de la France libre ==
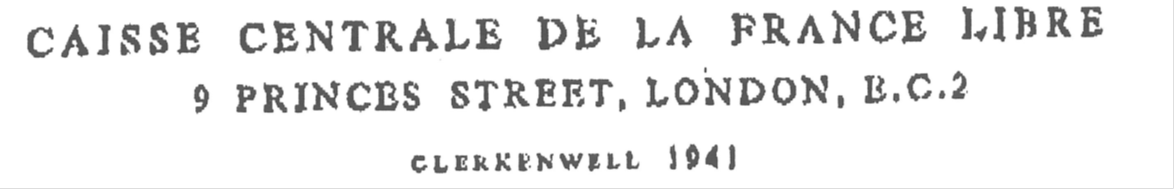
Letterhead of the CCFL, 1941

The CCFL was created by an ordinance of De Gaulle on 2 December 1941 in London, which transformed the prior financial service (French: service des finances) of Free France into a more formal institution. The institution's role was defined as bank of issue and public treasury, and the ordinance gave it the responsibility for "issuing and taking charge of banknotes in the territories of Free France". It had its first supervisory board meeting in early 1942, attended by De Gaulle and René Pleven. Its missions were complemented with foreign exchange controls by ordinance of 24 July 1942. Its offices were on 9 Prince's Street, across the street from the Bank of England's headquarters, in a building that was subsequently damaged by a German V-1 flying bomb and no longer exists.

Following the takeover of French North Africa in November 1942 (Operation Torch), the French Committee of National Liberation (CFLN) was formed in June 1943 and formally succeeded Free France. The CCFL's head office subsequently moved from London to Algiers at 12, boulevard Laferrière (later renamed boulevard Mohamed-Khemisti). The CFLN simultaneously relied on the monetary infrastructure of the Banque de l'Algérie, which it leveraged for example to supply banknotes during the liberation of Corsica in October 1943.

== Caisse centrale de la France d'outre-mer ==
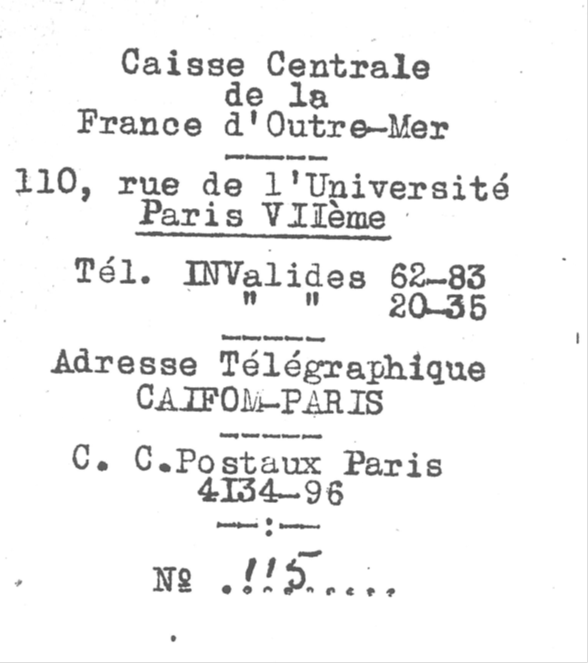
Letterhead of the CCFOM, 1944

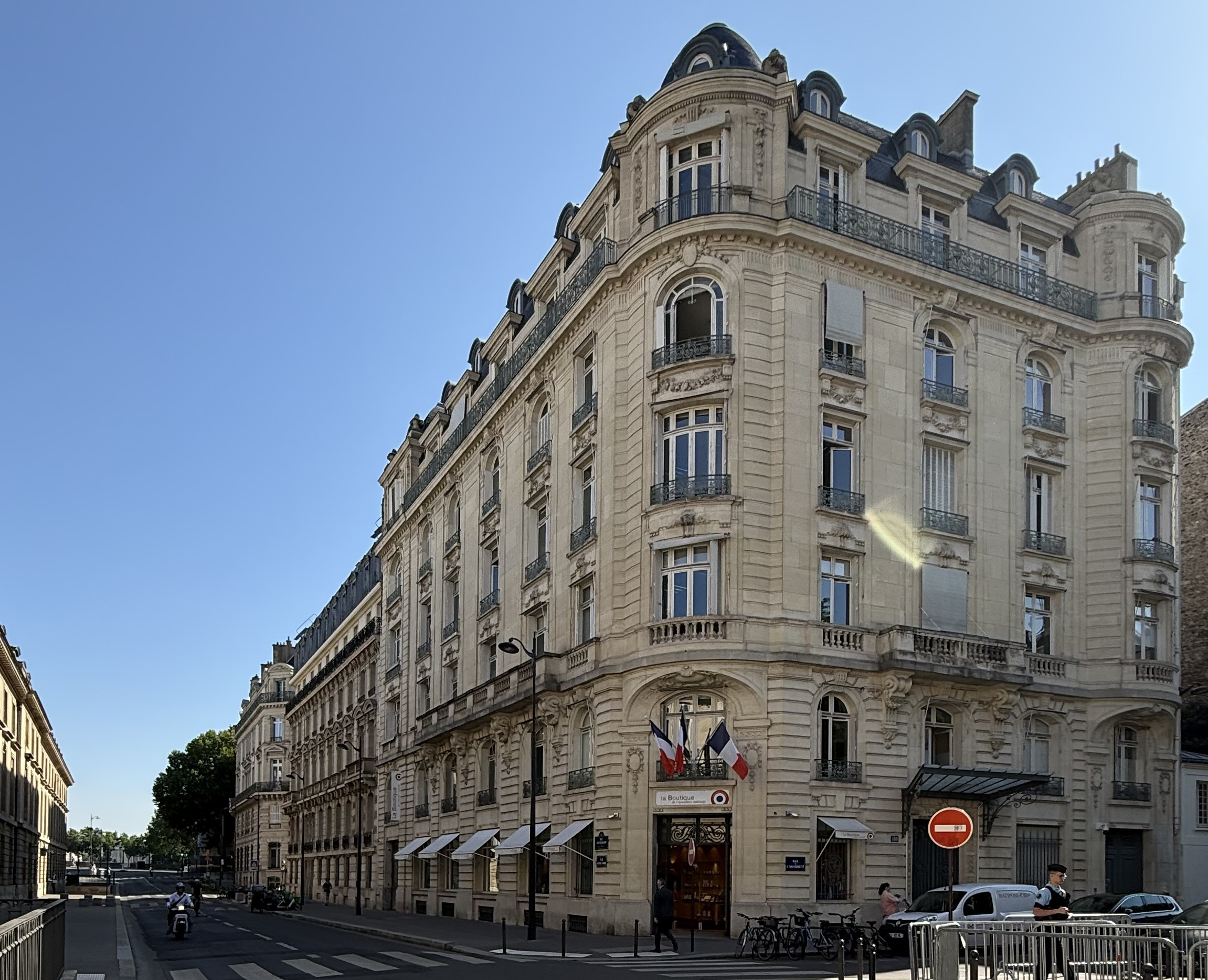
Former CCFOM head office at 110, rue de l'Université in Paris

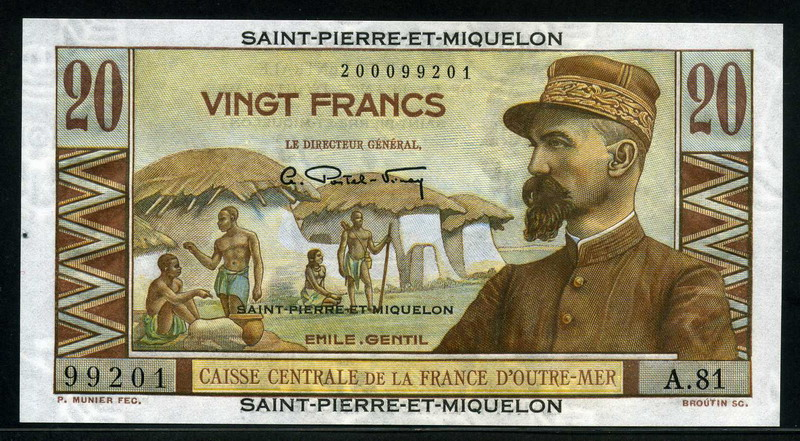
1950s banknote of the CCFOM (Saint-Pierre-et-Miquelon)

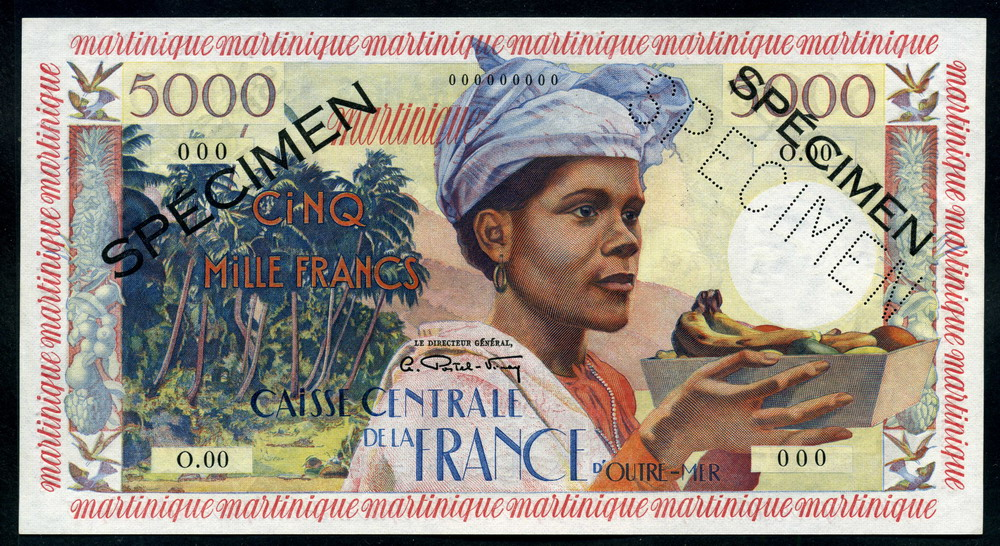
1960 banknote of the CCFOM (Martinique)

Instead of being phased out as its initial role was coming to an end, however, the Caisse Centrale was given renewed impetus as the Brazzaville Conference in early 1944 initiated a drive for economic and social development of the French colonies. While the conference was underway, the commissioner for finances within the CFLN, Pierre Mendès France, repurposed the CCFL towards financing economic and social development of the French overseas territories, and had it renamed it the Caisse Centrale de la France d'Outre-Mer (CCFOM) by ordinance of 2 February 1944. Even so, the CCFOM was still the bank of issue for some of France's overseas territories, including French Equatorial Africa, Cameroon, Guadeloupe, Guyana, Martinique, Réunion, and Saint-Pierre-et-Miquelon.

With the liberation of France, the CCFOM relocated from Algiers to Paris in early September 1944. New measures were implemented on both the monetary and development fronts. In late 1945, the CFA franc was created with a modified parity to the French franc, resulting in the CCFOM issuing French francs for the newly established overseas departments of Guadeloupe, Guyana and Martinique, and CFA francs for French Equatorial Africa, Cameroon, the department of Réunion, and Saint-Pierre-et-Miquelon.

A few months later, French law 46-860 of 30 April 1946 created the Fonds d'Investissement pour le Développement Économique et Social des Territoires d'Outre-Mer (FIDES, lit. 'Fund for Investment and Economic and Social Development for the Overseas Territories') and entrusted its management to the CCFOM. The FIDES represented the first-ever explicit acknowledgement by the French government of fiscal expenditure for its African colonies' economic development, in contrast to earlier policies that only allowed for loans. In 1952, a separate fund, the Fonds d'Investissement des Départements d'Outre-Mer (FIDOM) was created for the overseas departments.

In 1955, at the initiative of the CCFOM's head André Postel-Vinay, the French government transferred the CCFOM's monetary role in French Equatorial Africa to a new entity, the Institut d'Émission de l'Afrique Équatoriale Française et du Cameroun (IEAEFC), simultaneously as the BAO was also deprived of its longstanding issuance privilege in French West Africa. The IEAEFC would be renamed in 1959 as the Banque Centrale des États de l'Afrique Équatoriale et du Cameroun (BCEAEC), which itself later became the BEAC.

The CCFOM created development finance subsidiaries in the French colonies, some of which would continue as national development banks following the respective countries' independence: these included the Crédit de l'Afrique Équatoriale Française (est. 1949), Banque du Bénin and Crédit de Madagascar (1954), Crédit de Côte d'Ivoire and Crédit de Guinée (1955), Crédit du Sénégal (1956), Crédit de la Haute Volta, Crédit du Niger, Crédit du Soudan (in Mali), and Crédit du Togo (1957).

== Caisse centrale de coopération économique ==
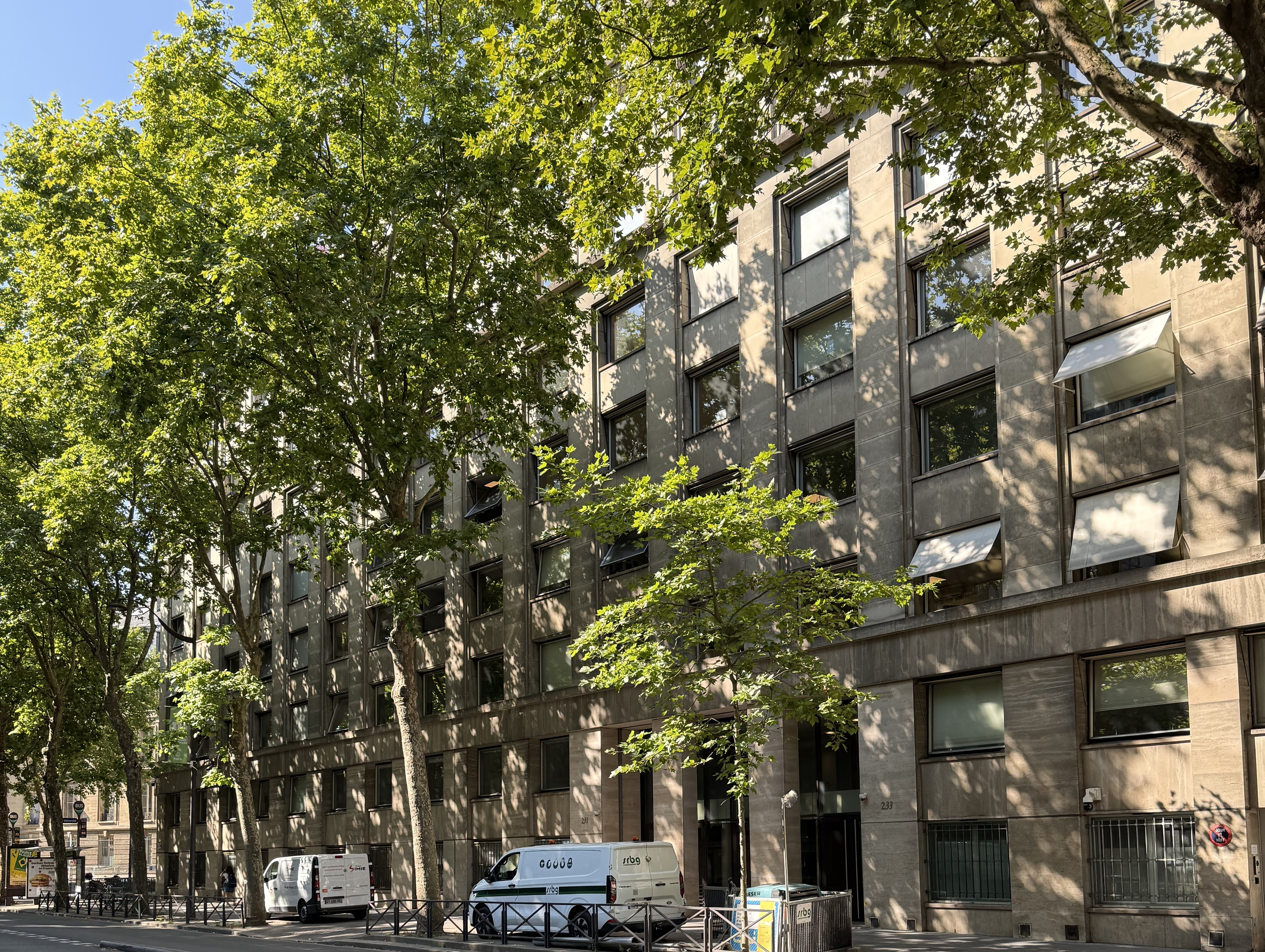
Former CCCE head office at 233, boulevard Saint-Germain in Paris, lately seat of the Assemblée parlementaire de la Francophonie

In 1960, several of France's African colonies gained independence. The CCFOM had its name changed to Caisse centrale de coopération économique (CCCE) by ordinance of 30 December 1958, while the FIDES was to be substituted in the newly sovereign countries by a new Fonds d'aide et de coopération (FAC, lit. 'Fund for Assistance and Cooperation'). Thus the CCCE would manage the FIDOM in French overseas departments, the FIDES in overseas territories, and the FAC in the former colonies. A few days later, the ordinance of 7 January 1959 established the IEDOM and transferred to it the CCCE's monetary authority in Guadeloupe, Guyana, Martinique and Réunion. The CCCE was also instrumental in the creation in 1967 of the separate Institut d'Émission d'Outre-Mer (IEOM), which took over the issuance privilege formerly held by the Banque de l'Indochine for French territories in the Pacific.

In early 1968, the CCCE absorbed the French development agency for Algeria (Caisse d'équipement pour le développement de l'Algérie / CEDA, est. 1959) whose activity was being pared down. It kept issuing CFA notes for Saint-Pierre-et-Miquelon, until these were replaced by the IEDOM's French francs on 1 January 1973. In 1977, the CCCE created a subsidiary to promote private-sector development, the Société de Promotion et de participation pour la coopération économique, known as Proparco. In 1992, the CCCE was renamed the Caisse Française de Développement, and in 1998, Agence Française de Développement.

The network of the CCFOM's national development subsidiaries kept evolving under the CCCE, as the Crédit de l'AEF was broken up in 1960 into the Crédit du Cameroun, Banque Nationale de Développement du Congo, and Banque Gabonaise de Developpement. More creations followed in the former Indian Ocean territories, namely the Banque Nationale Malagasy (1968), Société de crédit pour le développement des Comores or Credicom (1974), Caisse de développement de Djibouti (1982) and, also in 1982, the Banque de développement des Comores.

The CCCE had its head office at 233, boulevard Saint-Germain in Paris, then in the 1980s relocated to the Cité du Retiro off the prestigious rue du Faubourg Saint-Honoré.

== Leadership ==
- René Pleven, Chairman (président) of CCFL 1941-1944
- Pierre Denis, Director-General of CCFL 1941-1944 then Chairman (président du conseil de surveillance) of CCFOM 1945-1951
- André Diethelm, Director-General of CCFL 1941-1944
- James Leclerc, Chairman of CCFOM 1944-1945
- André Postel-Vinay, Director-General of CCFOM 1944-1958 then of CCCE 1958-1973
- François Bloch-Lainé, Chairman of CCFOM 1951-1958 then of CCCE 1958-1964
- Guillaume Guindey, Chairman of CCCE 1964-1972
- Pierre Calvet, Chairman of CCCE 1972-1976
- Claude Panouillot, Director-General of CCCE 1973-1979
- Robert Julienne, Chairman of CCCE 1976-1978
- André Valls, Chairman of CCCE 1978-1981
- Yves Roland-Billecart, Director-General of CCCE 1979-1989
- Philippe Huet, Chairman of CCCE 1981-1984
- Jacques Campet, Chairman of CCCE 1984-1992
- Philippe Jurgensen, Director-General of CCCE 1989-1992

== See also ==
- List of central banks
- List of development aid agencies
- List of banks in France
