= CFA franc =

Two common currencies of 14 African countries

Usage of: West African CFA franc (XOF) Central African CFA franc (XAF)

CFA franc (French: franc CFA, [fʁɑ̃ seɛfɑ]) is the name of two currencies used by 227 million people (as of 2026) in fourteen African countries:

- West African CFA franc (where "CFA" stands for Communauté Financière Africaine, i.e. "African Financial Community" in English), used in eight West African countries, with ISO currency code XOF;
- Central African CFA franc (where "CFA" stands for Coopération Financière en Afrique centrale, i.e. "Financial Cooperation in Central Africa" in English), used in six Central African countries, with ISO currency code XAF.

Although the two currencies are commonly called CFA franc and (currently) have the same value, they are not interchangeable. It is therefore not a common monetary zone but two juxtaposed zones.

Both CFA francs have a fixed exchange rate (peg) to the euro guaranteed by France: €1 = F.CFA 655.957 exactly. To ensure this convertibility guarantee, member countries were required to deposit half of their foreign exchange reserves with the French Treasury, but this requirement was dropped in 2019 (effective in 2021) for the West African CFA franc. This requirement remains unchanged for the Central African CFA franc, which was not reformed in 2019.

These currencies have been criticized for restricting the sovereignty of the African member states, effectively putting their monetary policy in the hands of the European Central Bank. Others argue that countries using CFA franc are all equal and that CFA franc "helps stabilize the national currencies of Franc Zone member-countries and greatly facilitates the flow of exports and imports between France and the member-countries".

On 22 December 2019, it was announced that the West African currency would be reformed and replaced by an independent currency to be called Eco. In May 2020, the French National Assembly agreed to end the French engagement in the West African CFA franc, including the foreign reserve deposit requirements, thereby facilitating the transition to the Eco. Despite initial plans for a monetary union by late 2020, setbacks including the COVID-19 pandemic, global geopolitical uncertainties, and failure to meet criteria resulted in continuous postponements, with the fifth launch target date set for July 2027.

== Usage ==
CFA francs are used in fourteen countries: twelve nations formerly ruled by France in West and Central Africa (excluding Guinea and Mauritania, which withdrew), plus Guinea-Bissau (a former Portuguese colony), and Equatorial Guinea (a former Spanish colony). These fourteen countries have a combined population of 210.4 million people (as of 2023), and a combined annual GDP of US$313.7 billion (as of 2023).

== Name ==
Between 1945 and 1958, CFA stood for Colonies françaises d'Afrique ("French colonies of Africa"); then for Communauté française d'Afrique ("French Community of Africa") between 1958 (establishment of the French Fifth Republic) and the independence of these African countries at the beginning of the 1960s. Since independence, CFA is taken to mean Communauté Financière Africaine (African Financial Community) or Coopération financière en Afrique centrale (see Institutions below).

== History ==
=== Creation ===
The CFA franc was created on 26 December 1945, along with the CFP franc. The reason for their creation was the weakness of the French franc immediately after World War II. When France ratified the Bretton Woods Agreement in December 1945, the French franc was devalued in order to set a fixed exchange rate with the US dollar. New currencies were created in the French colonies to spare them the strong devaluation, thereby making it easier for them to import goods from France (simultaneously making it harder for them to export goods to France). French officials presented the decision as an act of generosity. René Pleven, the French Minister of Finance, was quoted as saying:

In a show of her generosity and selflessness, metropolitan France, wishing not to impose on her far-away daughters the consequences of her own poverty, is setting different exchange rates for their currency.

=== Exchange rate ===
The CFA franc was created with a fixed exchange rate versus the French franc. This exchange rate was changed only twice, in 1948 and in 1994 (besides nominal adaptation to the new French franc in 1960 and the Euro in 1999).

Exchange rate:

- 26 December 1945 to 16 October 1948 – F.CFA 1 = 1.70 French franc. This 70 centime premium is the consequence of the creation of the CFA franc, which spared the French African colonies the devaluation of December 1945 (before December 1945, 1 local franc in these colonies was worth 1 French franc).
- 17 October 1948 to 31 December 1959 – F.CFA 1 = 2 French francs (the CFA franc had followed the French franc's devaluation versus the US dollar in January 1948, but on 18 October 1948, the French franc devalued again and this time the CFA franc was revalued against the French franc to offset almost all of this new devaluation of the French franc; after October 1948, the CFA followed all the successive devaluations of the French franc)
- 1 January 1960 to 11 January 1994– F.CFA 1 = NF 0.02 (1 January 1960: the French franc redenominated, with 100 old francs becoming 1 new franc)
- 12 January 1994 to 31 December 1998– F.CFA 1 = F 0.01. An overnight 50% devaluation.
- 1 January 1999 onwards – F.CFA 100 = €0.152449 or €1 = F.CFA 655.957. (1 January 1999: the euro replaced FRF at the rate of 6.55957 FRF for 1 euro)

The 1960 and 1999 events merely reflect changes of currency in use in France: the actual relative value of the CFA franc versus the French franc/euro only changed in 1948 and 1994.

=== Changes in countries using the franc ===
In 1960, the period of global decolonization began, marking the end of European empires on the African continent. France disappeared from the map, leaving behind the CFA franc, a legacy of colonization, which circulates in almost all former French possessions in Africa. Over time, the number of countries and territories using the CFA franc has changed as some countries began introducing their own separate currencies. A couple of nations in West Africa have also chosen to adopt the CFA franc since its introduction, despite the fact that they had never been French colonies.

- 1960: Guinea leaves and begins issuing Guinean francs.
- 1962: Mali leaves and begins issuing Malian francs.
- 1973: Madagascar leaves (in 1972, according to another source) and begins issuing its own francs, the Malagasy franc, which ran concurrently with the Malagasy ariary (1 ariary = 5 Malagasy francs).
- 1973: Mauritania leaves, replacing the franc with the Mauritanian ouguiya (1 ouguiya = 5 CFA francs).
- 1974: Saint-Pierre and Miquelon leaves for French franc, which changed later to the Euro.
- 1975: Réunion leaves for French franc, which changed later to the Euro.
- 1976: Mayotte leaves for French franc, which changed later to the Euro.
- 1984: Mali rejoins (1 CFA franc = 2 Malian francs).
- 1985: Equatorial Guinea joins (1 franc = 4 bipkwele).
- 1997: Guinea-Bissau joins (1 franc = 65 pesos).

=== European Monetary Union ===
In 1998, in anticipation of Economic and Monetary Union of the European Union, the Council of the European Union addressed the monetary agreements France had with the CFA Zone and Comoros and ruled that:

- The agreements are unlikely to have any material effect on the monetary and exchange rate policy of the Eurozone.
- In their present forms and states of implementation, the agreements are unlikely to present any obstacle to a smooth functioning of economic and monetary union.
- Nothing in the agreements can be construed as implying an obligation for the European Central Bank (ECB) or any national central bank to support the convertibility of the CFA and Comorian francs.
- Modifications to the existing agreements will not lead to any obligations for the European Central or any national central bank.
- The French Treasury will guarantee the free convertibility at a fixed parity between the euro and the CFA and Comorian francs.
- The competent French authorities shall keep the European Commission (EC), the European Central Bank and the Economic and Financial Committee informed about the implementation of the agreements and inform the Committee prior to changes of the parity between the euro and the CFA and Comorian francs.
- Any change to the nature or scope of the agreements would require Council approval on the basis of a Commission recommendation and ECB consultation.

=== Criticism in France ===
The yellow vest movement in France includes in its brochure the demand for the end of the CFA franc in Central and West Africa. The yellow vest movement, perceives the CFA franc as a tool of French imperialism and a catch-all on African economies.

=== Currency printed in France ===
The Banque de France is responsible for producing CFA franc notes and coins in its Chamalières factory, which is seen by some critics as a lack of sovereignty for African states.

=== Currency devaluation ===
The countries of the CFA franc zone are seen as the preserve of the former guardian power, France, which leads to situation that sometimes fuels rumors of a devaluation of the CFA franc. The CFA franc is too strong a currency, overvalued by about 10%. Even if in the short term, the option of a devaluation seems to be excluded.

=== Symbolism ===
For some African economists, the debate on economic realities should be prioritized over the symbols of the CFA franc.

=== Stability ===
For supporters of the CFA Franc, the economic stability that the CFA Franc provides lies in monetary cooperation. The underdevelopment of the countries in the franc zone is attributed to factors independent of their monetary and exchange rate policies.

=== Criticism and replacement in West Africa ===
The currency has been criticized for making national monetary policy for the developing countries of French West Africa all but impossible, since the CFA's value is pegged to the euro (whose monetary policy is set by the European Central Bank). Others disagree and argue that the CFA "helps stabilize the national currencies of Franc Zone member-countries and greatly facilitates the flow of exports and imports between France and the member-countries". The European Union's 2008 assessment of the CFA's link to the euro noted that "benefits from economic integration within each of the two monetary unions of the CFA franc zone, and even more so between them, remained remarkably low" but that "the peg to the French franc and, since 1999, to the euro as exchange rate anchor is usually found to have had favourable effects in the region in terms of macroeconomic stability".

Critics point out that the currency is controlled by the French treasury, and in turn African countries channel more money to France than they receive in aid and have no sovereignty over their monetary policies. In January 2019, Italian ministers accused France of impoverishing Africa through the CFA franc, and criticism continued from various African organizations. On 21 December 2019, President Alassane Ouattara of the Ivory Coast and President Emmanuel Macron of France announced an initiative to replace the West African CFA Franc with the Eco. Subsequently, a reform of the West African CFA franc was initiated. In May 2020, the French National Assembly agreed to end the French engagement in the West African CFA franc. The countries using the currency will no longer have to deposit half of their foreign exchange reserves with the French Treasury. In December 2024, in a report adopted by the French Foreign Affairs Committee, it was published that the reform of the CFA franc in 2019 had been incomplete, largely due to the reluctance of African heads of state to complete it.

In November 2024, the 'Tournons la Page' network and the Sciences Po Center for International Research (CERI) published a survey on relations between West African and Central African countries from former French possessions. Nearly 95% of West Africans surveyed expressed their desire to leave.

The broader Economic Community of West African States (ECOWAS), which includes the members of UEMOA, plans to introduce its own common currency for its member states by 2027, for which they have also formally adopted the name Eco.

=== Debate on ending the Central African CFA ===
On April 25, 2023, the subject of the CFA franc was discussed at the ministerial meeting of the Economic and Monetary Community of Central Africa (CEMAC) and France. The French perceive the guarantee provided to the CFA franc, and the assurance of its convertibility, as a pillar of economic stability for the region. France remains “open” and “available” to CEMAC proposals to reform monetary cooperation in Central Africa, as has happened in West Africa.

=== Activism against the CFA Franc ===
In May 2025, activists, economists and civil society representatives opposed to the use of the CFA franc will organize conferences and meetings across African capitals.

== Institutions ==
There are two different currencies called the CFA franc: the West African CFA franc (ISO 4217 currency code XOF), and the Central African CFA franc (ISO 4217 currency code XAF). They are distinguished in French by the meaning of the abbreviation CFA. These two CFA francs have the same exchange rate with the euro (1 euro = 655.957 XOF = 655.957 XAF), and they are both guaranteed by the French treasury (Trésor public), but the two currencies are only legal tender in their respective member countries.

=== West African ===
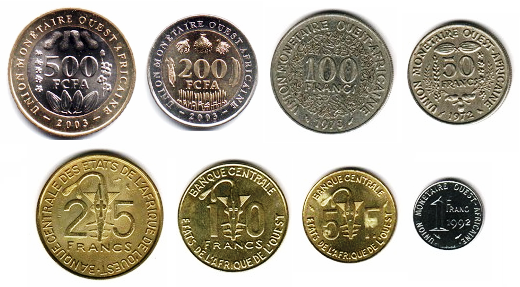
West African CFA franc coins

The West African CFA franc (XOF) is known in French as the Franc CFA, where CFA stands for Communauté financière d'Afrique ('Financial Community of Africa') or Communauté Financière Africaine ("African Financial Community"). It is issued by the BCEAO (Banque Centrale des États de l'Afrique de l'Ouest, i.e., "Central Bank of the West African States"), located in Dakar, Senegal, for the eight countries of the UEMOA (Union Économique et Monétaire Ouest Africaine, i.e., "West African Economic and Monetary Union"):

- Benin
- Burkina Faso
- Guinea-Bissau
- Ivory Coast
- Mali
- Niger
- Senegal
- Togo

These eight countries have a combined population of 147.6 million people (as of 2023), and a combined GDP of US$199.4 billion (as of 2023).

=== Central Africa ===
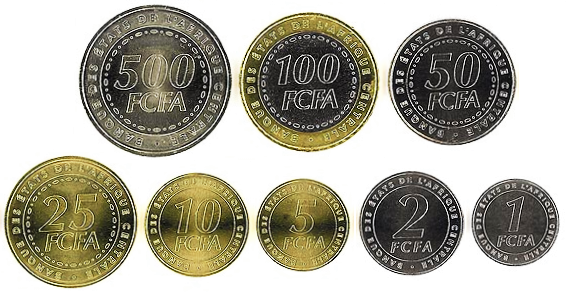
Central African CFA franc coins

The Central Africa CFA franc (XAF) is known in French as the Franc CFA, where CFA stands for Coopération financière en Afrique centrale ("Financial Cooperation in Central Africa"). It is issued by the BEAC (Banque des États de l'Afrique Centrale, i.e., "Bank of the Central African States"), located in Yaoundé, Cameroon, for the six countries of the CEMAC (Communauté Économique et Monétaire de l'Afrique Centrale, i.e., "Economic and Monetary Community of Central Africa"):

- Cameroon
- Central African Republic
- Chad
- Equatorial Guinea
- Gabon
- Republic of the Congo

These six countries have a combined population of 62.8 million people (as of 2023), and a combined GDP of US$114.3 billion (as of 2023).

In 1975, Central African CFA banknotes were issued with an obverse unique to each participating country, and common reverse, in a fashion similar to euro coins.

Equatorial Guinea, the only former Spanish colony in the zone, adopted the CFA in 1984.

== Gallery ==
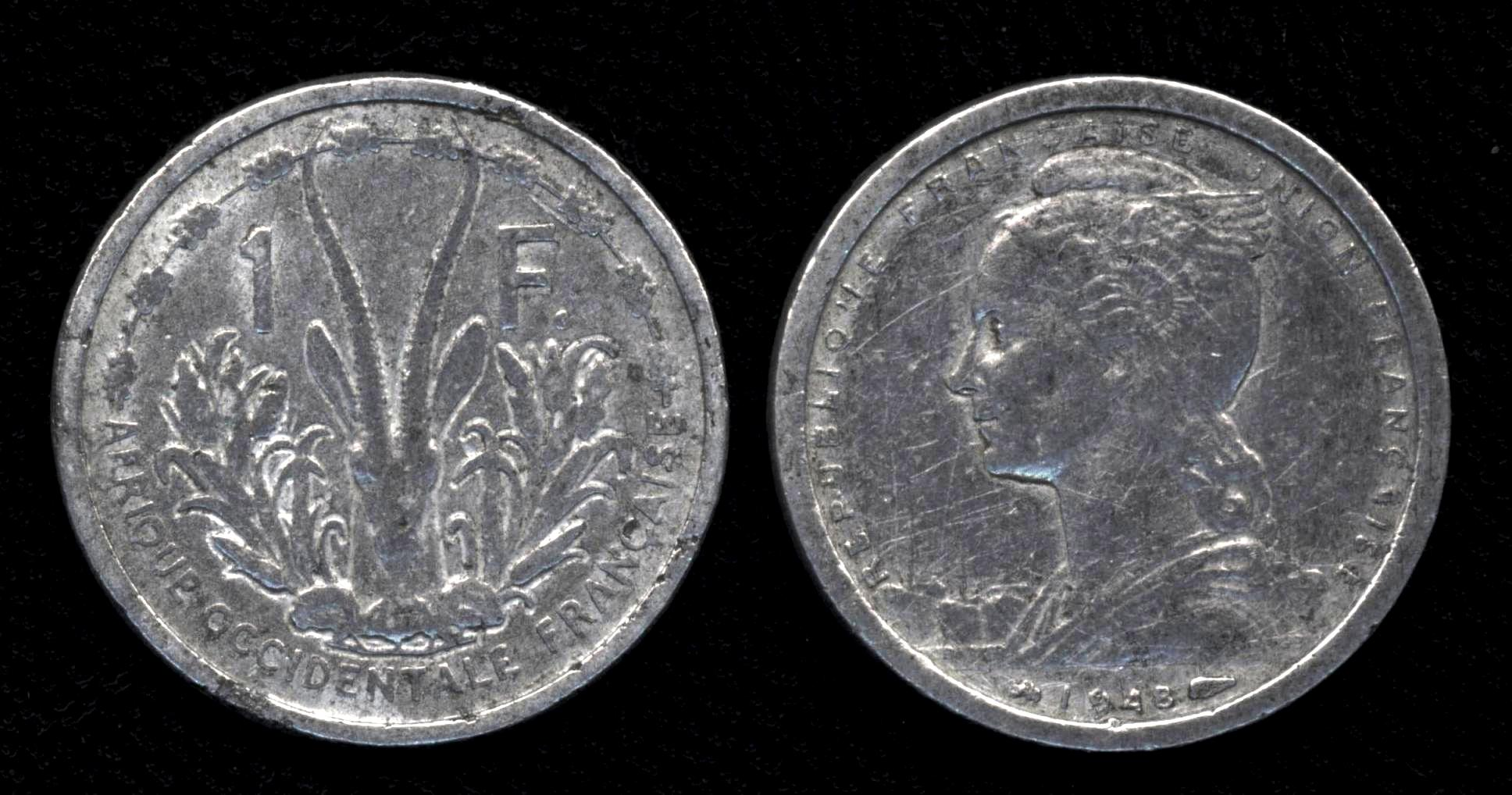
An F.CFA 1 coin

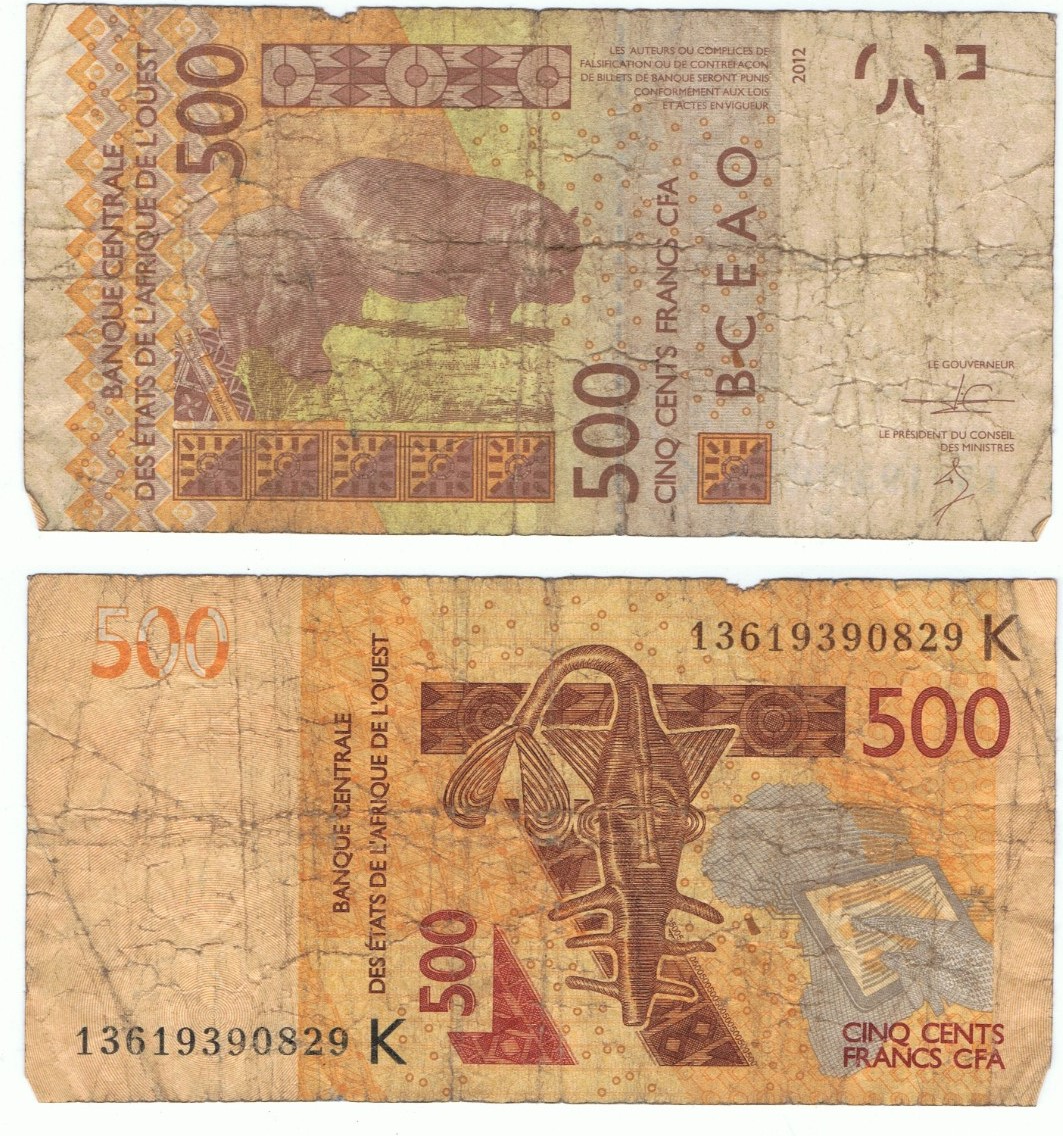
500 West African CFA francs

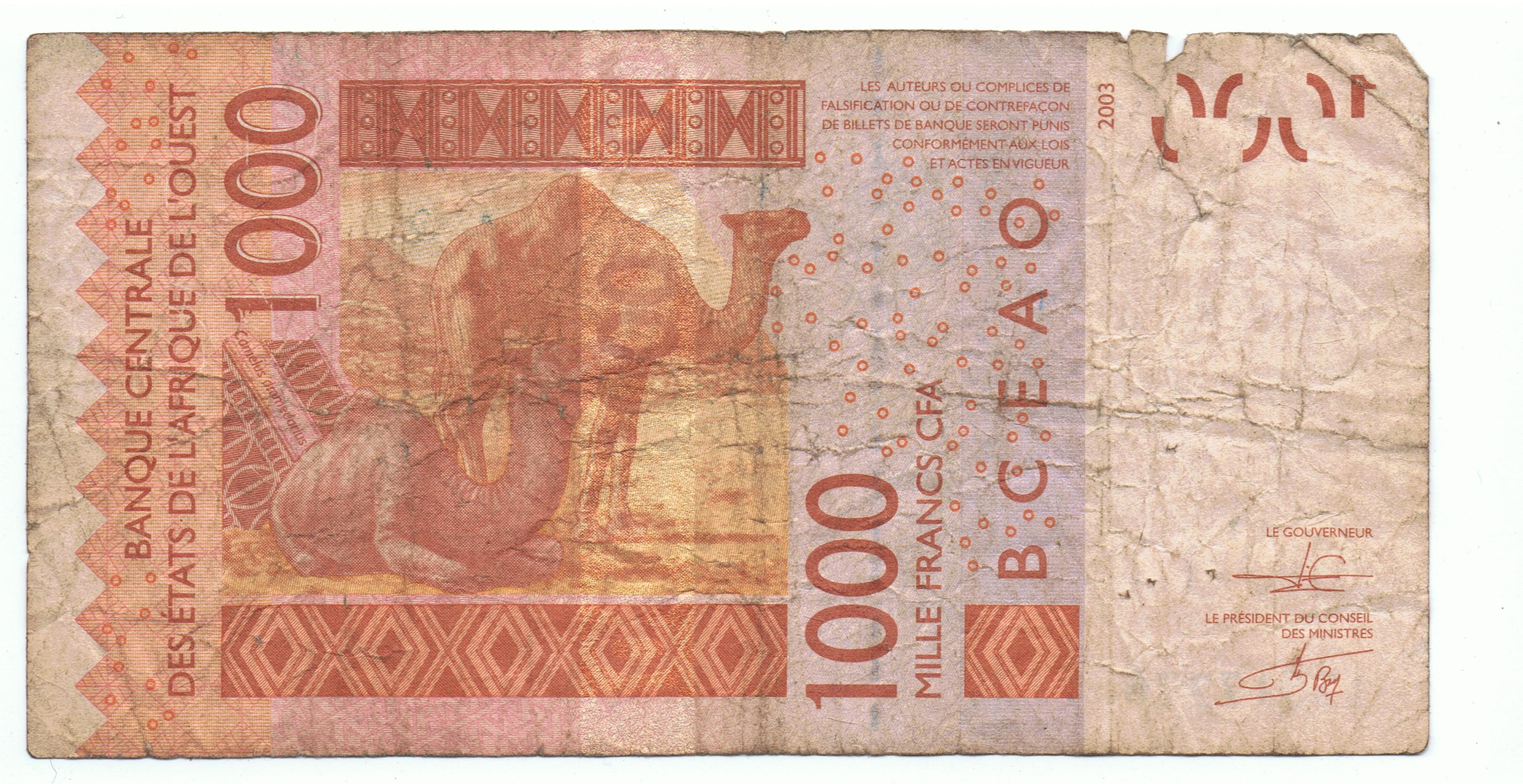
1000 West African CFA francs

== See also ==
- AM-Franc
- Comorian franc
- Congolese franc
- Currencies related to the euro
- French Indochinese piastre
- South Vietnamese đồng
- CFP franc
- Djiboutian franc
- Réunion franc
- Reichsmark
- Swiss franc
- Eco (currency)
- Euro
