= Economy of East Africa =

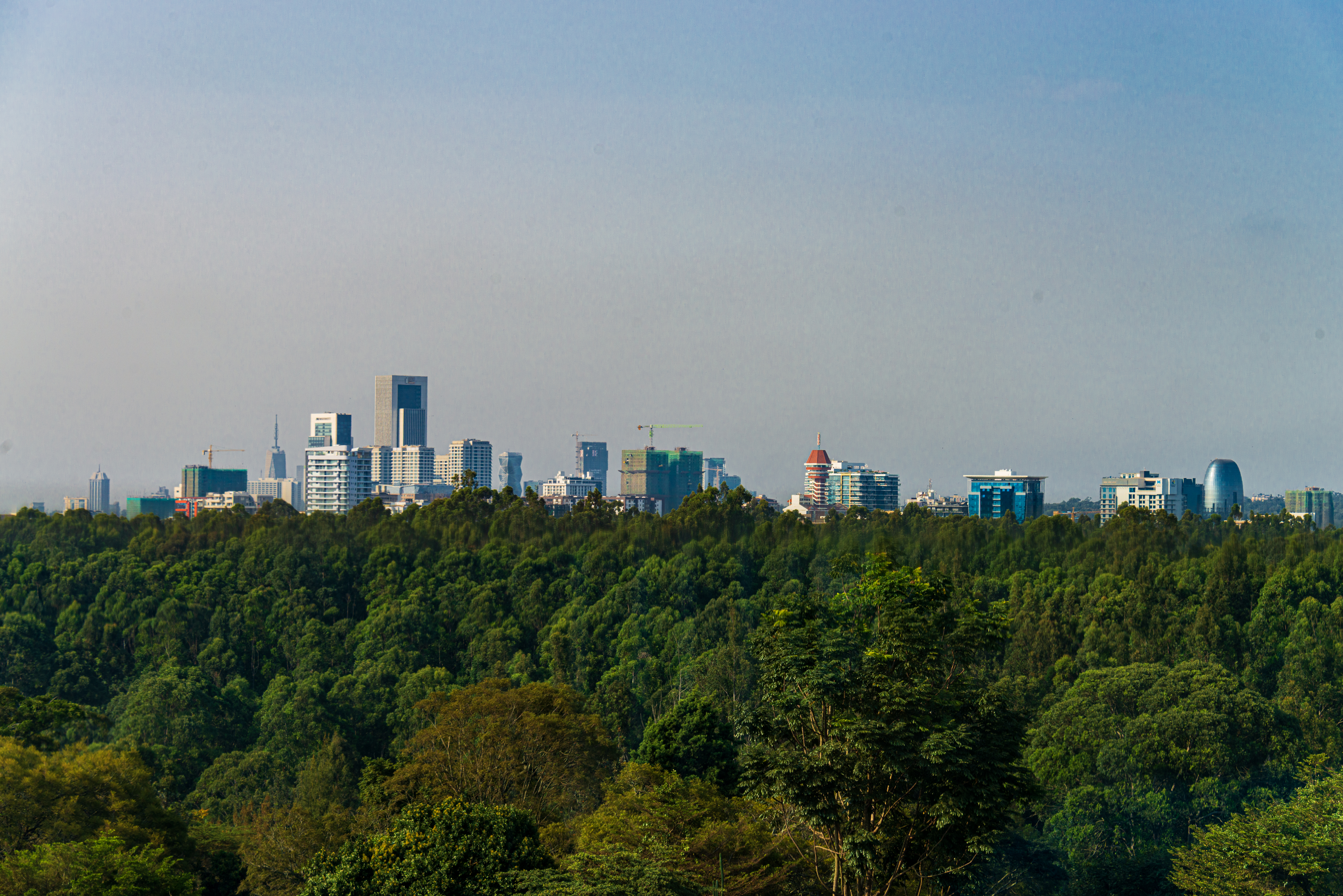
- Nairobi, A key financial hub of the region
- Currency: List: Burundian franc; Comorian franc; Djiboutian franc; Eritrean nakfa; Ethiopian birr; Kenyan shilling; Malagasy ariary; Mauritian rupee; Rwandan franc; Seychellois rupee; Somali shilling; South Sudanese pound; Sudanese pound; Tanzanian shilling; Ugandan shilling
- Trade organisations: East African Community; Common Market for Eastern and Southern Africa; Southern African Development Community; African Continental Free Trade Area
- Country group: Emerging markets; Developing economies; Least developed countries

Statistics
- Population: 439.31 million
- GDP: ▲$1.935 trillion (PPP; 2026); ▲$575.83 billion (nominal; 2026)
- GDP growth: 5.9% (2026 est.)
- GDP per capita: ▲$4,408 (PPP; 2026); ▲$1,311 (nominal; 2026)

External
- Exports: $49.129 billion
- Imports: $106.761 billion
- Gross external debt: 64.0%
- Some of the statistics in this infobox/article are aggregates of data from individual countries. Definition of East Africa in this article is as per African union with inclusion of Burundi as per African Development Bankand other regional organizations such as the East African Community All values, unless otherwise stated, are in US dollars.

The economy of East Africa is a diverse and rapidly developing regional economy, with agriculture playing a pivotal role as a backbone of the economy. As of 2026, East Africa has a GDP of around US$575.83 billion (nominal) and US$1.935 trillion (PPP) accounting for approximately 18% of Africa's total GDP. The region has an average growth rate of 5.9%, making it the fastest-growing region in Africa and placing it among the continent's strongest-performing regions.Kenya and Ethiopia are the largest national economies, together contributing roughly 48% of the regional economy. Nairobi and Addis Ababa are the main economic hubs, while other major economic centres include Dar es Salaam, Kampala, Mombasa, and Kigali.

As of 2026, East Africa’s economies varied significantly in size and wealth with the region having both the most wealthiest countries and most poorest countries in Africa. Kenya was the largest state economy, with a GDP of $151 billion, followed by Ethiopia at $127 billion and Tanzania at $96 billion. On the other hand, Comoros ($1.73 billion) and Seychelles ($2.37 billion) had the smallest economies. In terms of GDP per capita, the island countries of Seychelles ($17,675) and Mauritius ($13,812) were the wealthiest states in East Africa and among the wealthiest in Africa overall. On mainland East Africa, Djibouti ($4,421) and Kenya ($2,714) had the highest GDP per capita. East Africa was also the fastest-growing region, with Ethiopia (9.2%), Uganda (7.2%), and Rwanda (7.1%) pioneering this growth. Sudan recorded the lowest growth, with real GDP contracting by -4.2% due to the Sudanese Civil War.

Despite its overall economic growth, East Africa continues to face persistent challenges, including political instability, insecurity, natural disasters, and climate change. The ongoing war in Sudan and the al-Shabaab insurgency in Somalia have caused widespread displacement and disrupted livelihoods, while climate change has intensified droughts and floods across the region. Heavy reliance on rain-fed agriculture leaves millions vulnerable to unpredictable rainfall, crop failures, food insecurity, and climate-induced migration. Meanwhile, macroeconomic pressures persist, with currency depreciation in countries such as Tanzania increasing import costs and inflation, while Kenya’s and South sudan debt burden has raised debt-servicing costs and limited fiscal space for public investment.

== GDP ==
GDP (In USD billions)
Year	GDP	±
1980	57.700	—
1985	55.143	−4.43%
1990	55.991	+1.54%
1995	57.314	+2.36%
2000	74.488	+29.96%
2005	123.678	+66.04%
2010	227.770	+84.16%
2015	339.177	+48.91%
2020	391.843	+15.53%
2025	524.207	+33.78%

Gross Domestic Product in East Africa (1980 - April 2026)

East Africa's nominal GDP has expanded significantly, rising from US$227 billion in 2010 to US$575.83 billion in 2026, accounting for approximately 18% of Africa's total GDP, with an average growth rate of 5.8%. Kenya has the largest economy at US$151.15 billion, followed by Ethiopia at US$127.15 billion and Tanzania at US$96.18 billion. Uganda (US$72.24 billion) and Sudan (US$30.86 billion) follow. By PPP, Ethiopia has the region's largest economy at US$561.35 billion, followed by Kenya at US$436.13 billion. Seychelles and Mauritius have the highest nominal GDP per capita in East Africa, at US$17,675 and US$13,812 respectively, ranking among the highest in Africa. Among mainland countries, Djibouti has the highest GDP per capita at US$4,421, followed by Kenya at US$2,714. At the lower end, South Sudan (US$488), Burundi (US$546) and Eritrea (US$656) have the lowest GDP per capita in the region, also ranking among the lowest in Africa. The three smallest economies are Comoros at US$1.73 billion, Eritrea at US$2.28 billion and Seychelles at US$2.37 billion. Collectively, East Africa's economy has a PPP GDP of US$1.935 trillion.

East Africa Countries by GDP

Rank	Country	Nominal GDP	Share	GDP (PPP)	GDP per capita (nominal USD)	GDP per capita (PPP USD)
East Africa		575.83 B	100.00%	1.935 T	1,323	4,394
1	Kenya	151.15 B	26.25%	436.13 B	2,714	8,020
2	Ethiopia	127.15 B	22.08%	561.35 B	1,081	4,974
3	Tanzania	96.18 B	16.70%	322.69 B	1,362	4,607
4	Uganda	72.24 B	12.55%	206.68 B	1,476	4,192
5	Sudan	30.86 B	5.36%	133.24 B	864	2,451
6	Madagascar	20.98 B	3.64%	68.66 B	665	2,106
7	Rwanda	18.67 B	3.24%	67.32 B	1,198	4,524
8	Mauritius	16.94 B	2.94%	43.92 B	13,812	35,713
9	Somalia	14.82 B	2.57%	34.46 B	813	1,956
10	South Sudan	7.98 B	1.39%	19.67 B	488	1,540
11	Burundi	7.61 B	1.32%	15.44 B	546	1,031
12	Djibouti	4.87 B	0.85%	10.75 B	4,421	10,166
13	Seychelles	2.37 B	0.41%	4.59 B	17,675	35,855
14	Eritrea	2.28 B	0.40%	6.37 B	656	-
15	Comoros	1.73 B	0.30%	3.90 B	1,951	4,223

Real GDP growth in East Africa

East Africa is the fastest-growing region, with an annual GDP growth rate of 5.8%. Ethiopia records the highest growth at 9.2%, reflecting its economic reform programme, increased investment, mining expansion and rising electricity production. Uganda and Rwanda follow at 7.5% and 7.2%, respectively, with Uganda benefiting from strong domestic demand, private-sector credit and developing oil production, while Rwanda's expansion is being driven by investment in infrastructure, construction and services. Djibouti (6.0%) and Tanzania (5.9%) also maintain strong expansion, followed by Kenya at 4.5%, South Sudan and Comoros at 4.1%, and Burundi at 3.8%. Madagascar (3.6%), Mauritius (3.4%), Eritrea (2.8%) and Somalia (2.6%) record more moderate growth. At the lower end, Seychelles grows by 1.5%, affected by disruptions to international air connectivity and tourism, while Sudan records just 0.7%, largely reflecting the severe economic disruption caused by the ongoing conflict.

== Agriculture ==
Agriculture to GDP in East Africa

Market in Kenya

Agriculture is the backbone of East Africa's economy, serving as a major source of livelihoods , employment and export revenue across the region. On average, agriculture contributes about 20–30% of total GDP although the share differs considerably between countries ranging from 2.3% of GDP in Djiboutito 45.6% in Somalia.Farming also supports a large part of the rural population where it remains an important source of household income. Most agriculture is carried out on small farms although commercial and plantation farming are also significant in some countries. Common food crops include maize, rice, potatoes, bananas, cassava and beans, while coffee, tea, cotton, sugarcane and horticultural products are important cash crops and agricultural exports.

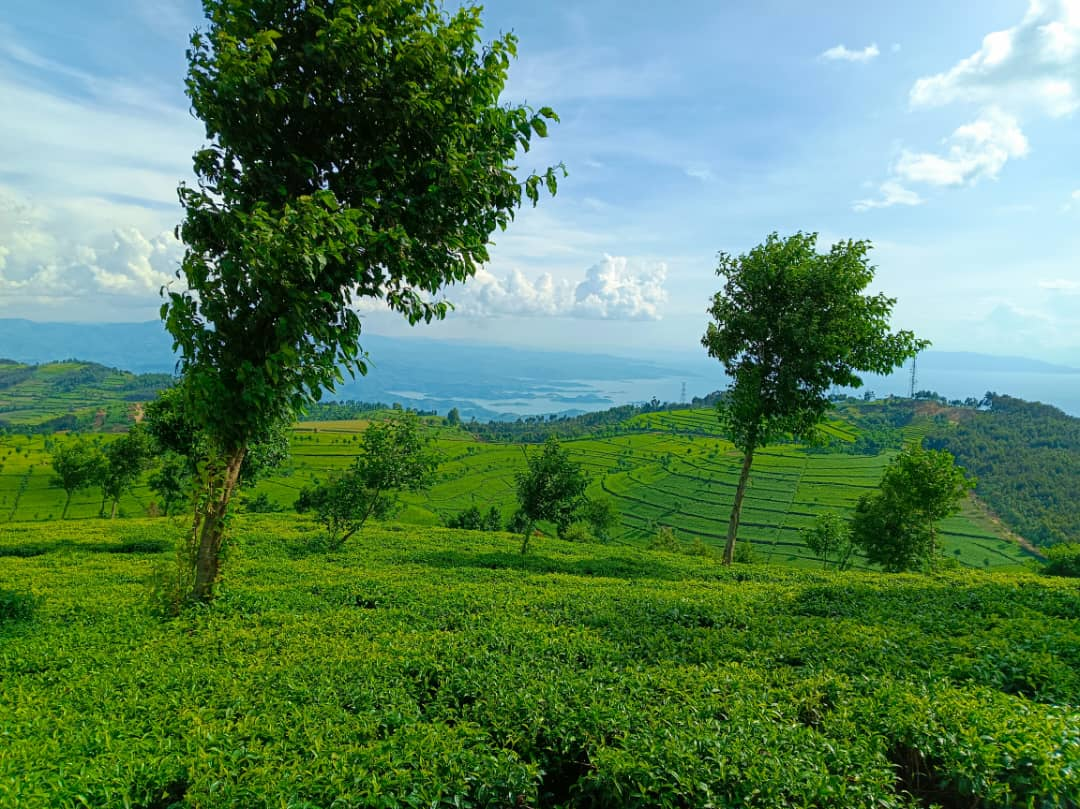
RutsiroTea Plantation, Rwanda

Agricultural production varies considerably across East Africa because of differences in geography. The Great Lakes and Rift Valley areas have relatively fertile soils , high reliable rainfall in many locations and varied elevations, making them suitable for crop production. The region around Lake Victoria and the highlands of Kenya, Uganda, Rwanda, Burundi and Ethiopia supports intensive cultivation of cereals, legumes, bananas, coffee, tea and horticultural crops while the arid and semi-arid lowlands of the Horn of Africa, spanning much of Somalia, Eritrea, eastern and northern Ethiopia and northern Kenya, are dominated by pastoralism and livestock production because of limited rainfall.

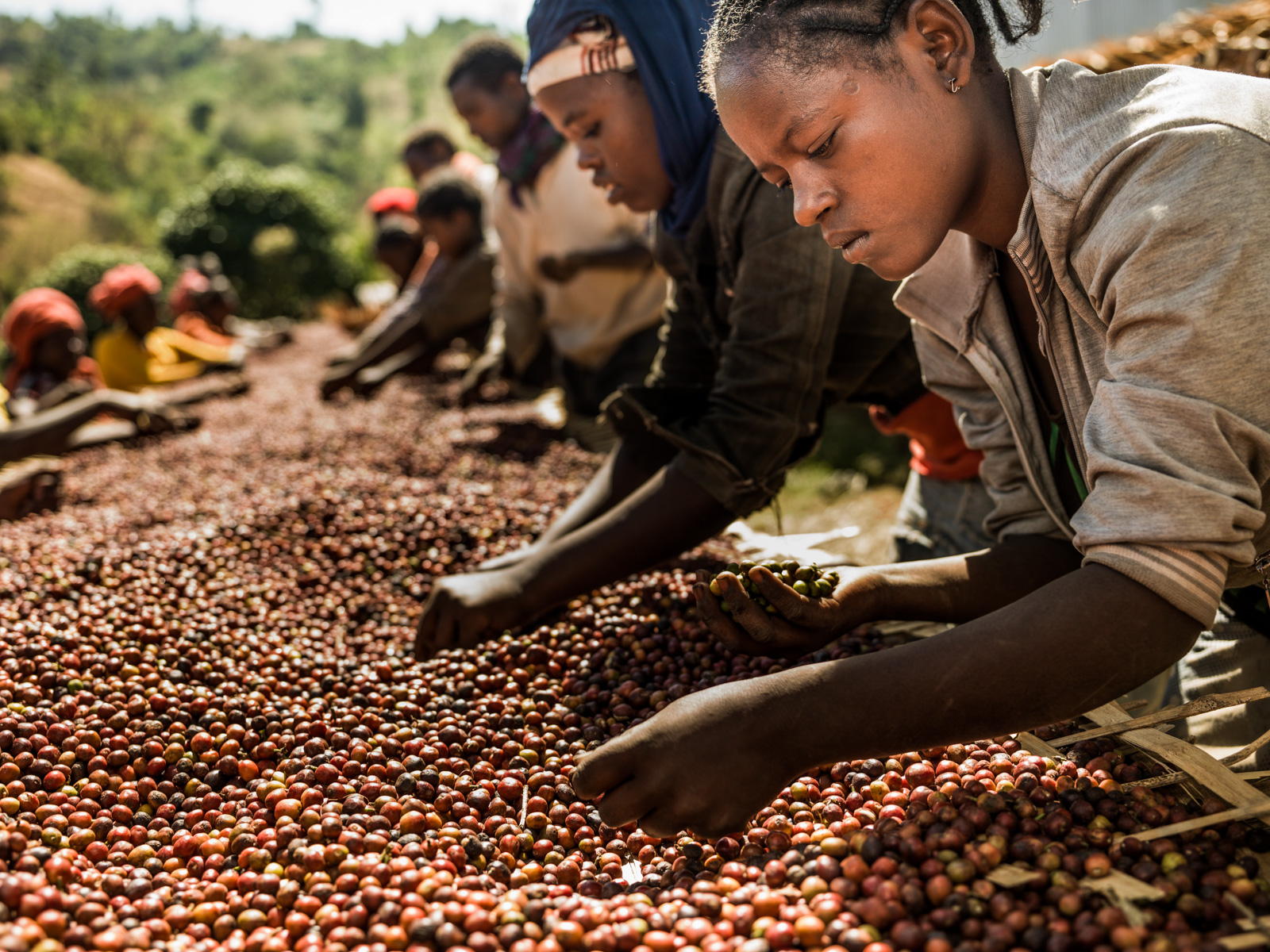
Coffee sorting process in Ethiopia

Rainfed agriculture remains overwhelmingly dominant across the region with more than 95% of agricultural production depending on rainfall making agricultural output highly vulnerable to climate variability and extreme weather. Unpredictable climate such as frequent droughts, floods and changing rainfall patterns have caused major losses in crops and livestock in the region while pest and diseases add further pressure on farmers. Poor Infrastructure such as poor rural roads, storage facilities, irrigation systems and low electricity access have also increase production costs and contribute to post harvest losses particularly for small-scale farmers.

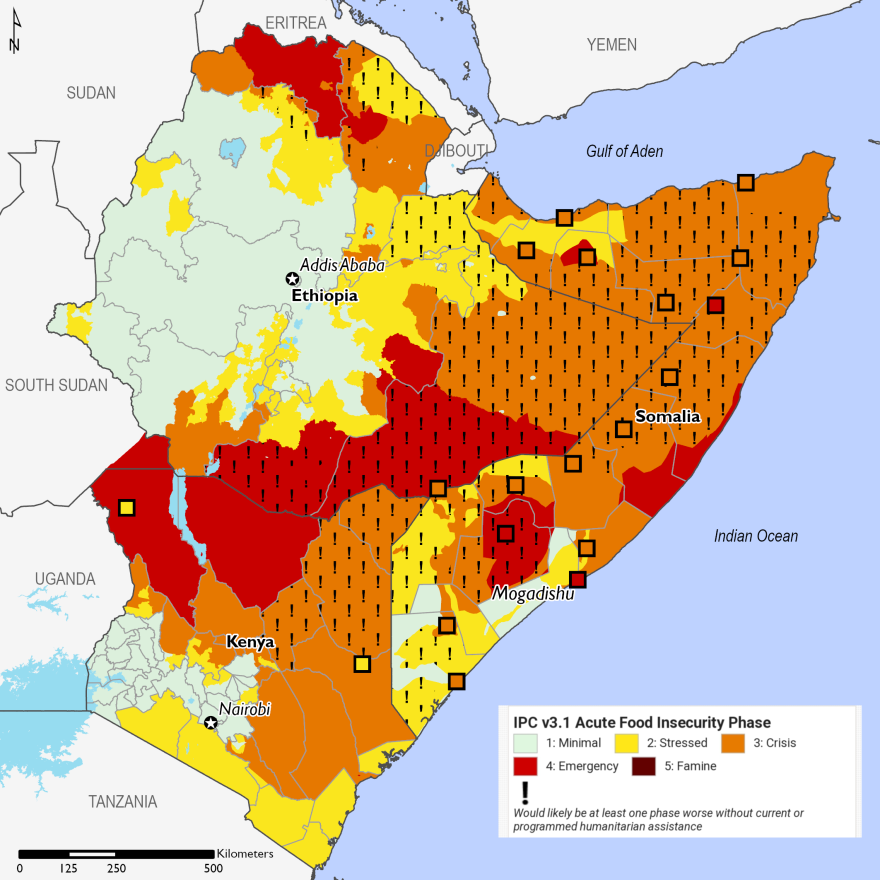
Drought in Horn of Africa

Maize is one of the most important crops by production volume and is the principal staple in much of mainland East Africa. Tanzania is a major regional producer and has emerged as the region's grain basket supplying maize and rice to deficit or high-demand markets such as Kenya. Tanzania produced nearly 11.7 million tonnes of maize in 2023/24, making it the second-largest maize producer in Africa in that period. Its large agricultural land base and expanding production have allowed it to play an important role in regional food supply and intra-regional trade.

Coffee and tea are among East Africa's most important agricultural exports. Ethiopia is Africa's largest coffee producer, and coffee accounts for a substantial share of its agricultural export earnings.Uganda is the region's largest exporter of coffee mainly Robusta coffee, with coffee remaining its leading agricultural foreign-exchange earner. Rwanda and Burundi have developed internationally recognized specialty Arabica coffee industries making coffee a major source of agricultural trade revenue for both countries. Coffee production is particularly important to millions of smallholder farmers across the highlands of the Great Lakes and Ethiopian regions.

Tea is another major export crop driven particularly by Kenya which is the world leading exporter of black tea accounting 28% of Kenya merchandise exports while Tanzania, Uganda and Rwanda also maintain substantial export-oriented tea industries. Kenya's agricultural export economy is further strengthened by horticulture whereby it is a major supplier of fresh produce and cut flowers to international markets and accounts for almost 40% of European Union cut-flower imports. Its horticultural sector includes flowers, vegetables, fruits and other high-value crops.

Horticulture is also becoming increasingly important elsewhere in the region, Rwanda has developed a growing export corridor for fresh horticultural products, with avocados among its leading products alongside French beans, passion fruit, chillies and specialty cut flowers. Improved air and road logistics, cold chain facilities and export standards have helped connect these products to international markets. By export value, Kenya is the largest agricultural exporter in East Africa, while Tanzania, Uganda and Ethiopia are among the region's largest exporters by physical volume.

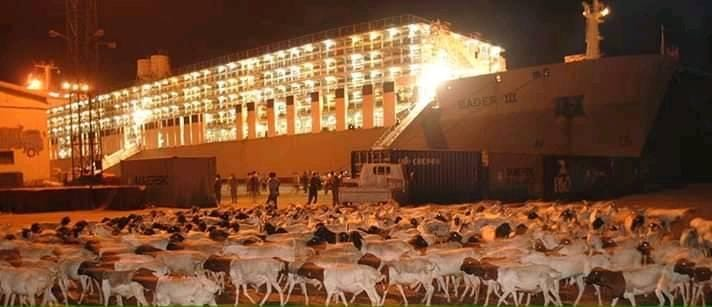
Livestock export in Berbera, Somaliland

Livestock is particularly important in the drier parts of East Africa. Somalia is one of Africa's leading livestock exporters with cattle, sheep, goats and camels forming an important part of its rural economy and external trade. Pastoralism also remains crucial sector to livelihoods across the arid lowlands of Ethiopia, Kenya, Somalia and Eritrea which are closely adapted to the region's dry environment, although recurrent droughts and water shortages can cause severe losses of livestock and household income.

Tuna fishing in Seychelles

Fishing is another major component of East Africa's food and agricultural economy. The African Great Lakes particularly Lake Victoria and Lake Tanganyika, support extensive fishing communities and provide fish for domestic consumption and regional markets. Uganda is a major fishing country mainly on Lake Victoria and other inland waters including Lake Albert and Lake Kyoga. Tanzania also has an important fisheries sector, benefiting from both its extensive inland waters and Indian Ocean coastline.In the island states of Seychelles and Mauritius, fisheries are particularly significant to the wider food and export economy.

The island countries have developed agricultural systems adapted to their limited land resources and specialized environments. Seychelles has a small agricultural sector and relies heavily on fisheries while importing a large proportion of its agricultural and food requirements because of its limited land area. In Mauritius, sugarcane continues to dominate the agricultural landscape, occupying more than 85% of the island's arable land and remaining an important agricultural commodity. In Comoros, cloves are the country's dominant agricultural export and account for as much as 71% of national merchandise exports.

Madagascar has one of Africa's most distinctive agricultural systems. Rice is the country'sabsolute staple and has one of the highest per capita rice consumption. It has extensive terraced rice paddies particularly in the highlands which reflect a deeply rooted agricultural culture influenced by the island's Austronesian heritage. Madagascar is also the world's largest producer of vanilla and the largest producer of Rice.

Agricultural conditions in the Horn of Africa differ significantly rom those of the Great Lakes region. The Great Lakes and Rift Valley areas benefit in many locations from fertile volcanic and alluvial soils, higher elevations and high reliable rainfall supporting dense rural populations and intensive crop production. The Horn arid and semi-arid lowlands instead depend heavily on livestock mobility seasonal water availability and trade networks.

South Sudan presents a different challenge. Despite possessing considerable arable land, the country remains a net importer of food and has a strong dependence on rainfed agriculture. Coarse grains particularly sorghum, maize and millet form important components of domestic agricultural production. Conflict and weak infrastructure has made agricultural development difficult limiting farmers access to markets, inputs and productive land. Sudan has experienced an even more severe disruption as a result of the ongoing conflict, which has affected agricultural production, food supply chains and rural livelihoods. The Food and Agriculture Organization (FAO) warned that roughly 40% of Sudan's population faces a severe food crisis.

East Africa has also implemented major agricultural reforms aimed at increasing productivity, reducing imports and improving farmer access to inputs. Ethiopia has expanded irrigated wheat production in its lowland areas through land-use reforms, irrigation investment and government support, with the objective of reducing dependence on imported wheat. Tanzania's Agenda 10/30 fiscal reforms substantially increased public spending on agriculture while Kenya has also digitized fertilizer distribution through its e-voucher subsidy system, allowing registered farmers to receive subsidized fertilizer allocations through digital platforms and redeem them at designated distribution points.

Technology is becoming increasingly important to the region's agricultural transformation. East Africa has emerged as an important center of agritech innovation in countries such as Kenya and Tanzania including digital farmer registration, mobile-based agricultural services, electronic subsidies, digital payments, weather information and market platforms which are increasingly being used to improve the distribution of inputs and connect farmers with markets while reducing some of the logistical and administrative problems associated with traditional agricultural programs.

Intraregional trade in East Africa has become increasingly important, especially within the East African Community (EAC). The main agricultural products traded include maize, rice, beans and other food commodities. However, outside the EAC tariffs and trade barriers make agricultural trade more difficult.

== Industry ==
Industry sector in East Africa as a % of GDP

Manufacturing as a % GDP in East Africa

The industrial sector in East Africa is a rapidly transforming market and plays a major role in the region’s economy. It has gradually moved from depending mainly on raw resource production towards activities such as manufacturing, mineral processing, construction and regional production supply chains . However industrial development is not the same across all countries. Kenya, Ethiopia Tanzania and Uganda have some of the largest and most diversified industrial bases, while Rwanda, Madagascar, Mauritius and other countries have developed more specialised industries. The smaller island economies including Comoros and Seychelles have smaller ndustrial sectors partly because of their geographical size, resource structures and dependence on maritime trade.

Manufacturing is a major sub-sector of East Africa industrial sector and includes Agro-processing, textiles and apparel, leather, pharmaceuticals etc and contributes roughly $40 billion to the economy (7 -10% of region GDP).Agro-processing is particularly important because of the region's large agricultural sector. East Africa produces cereals, tea, coffee , livestock and dairy products etc which provide raw materials for activities such as flour milling, food processing, beverage production, edible oils, animal feeds, sugar refining, dairy production and meat processing.

Kenya has one of the most diversified manufacturing sectors in East Africa with substantial private-sector participation and a large domestic consumer market. Its major industries include Agro-processing, pharmaceuticals, chemicals, textiles and apparel etc. Manufacturing contributes about 7% of GDP ($9.68 billion) making Kenya the largest manufacturing country in East Africa by value. Agro-processing is especially important because of the country large agricultural sector. Textiles and apparel are also strongly export-oriented, particularly towards the United States under AGOA. Kenya has expanded manufacturing through special economic zone (SEZ) and industrial parks including the Naivasha Special Economic Zone which supports logistics, manufacturing and industries that benefit from geothermal electricity.

Ethiopia has built a substantial manufacturing sector with strong government support for industrialisation and the development of industrial parks. Major activities include ready-made garments, textiles, food processing, beverages and construction materials. The industrial parks have been used to attract both domestic and foreign investment and to connect Ethiopian manufacturers with international production chains. Hawassa Industrial Park is particularly associated with textile and apparel manufacturing for export markets. Ethiopia also has substantial mineral resources and has expanded gold and other mineral production, making mining and mineral processing another part of its industrial base.

Tanzania industrial sector is closely connected to its natural resources, agriculture, construction and growing domestic market. Manufacturing activities include cement, rolled steel and agro-processing. The country infrastructure programme has increased demand for cement, steel and other construction materials while its mineral resources have supported the growth of processing industries. Tanzania natural-gas resources have also contributed to the development of its energy and industrial sectors.

Uganda manufacturing sector is closely linked to agriculture and import substitution with Food processing and Construction being among the major activities. Government policies have encouraged local production of goods that have traditionally been imported and have also promoted greater value addition to agricultural products. Rwanda has developed its industrial sector around dedicated economic zones and industrial parks. The Kigali Special Economic Zone contains manufacturing, logistics, commercial and other industrial activities, while Rwanda has also promoted electric mobility and other specialised industries.

Mauritius has one of the more diversified manufacturing sectors in the region. Its industrial economy has moved beyond traditional sugar refining and now includes higher-value activities such as medical devices, technical textiles, pharmaceuticals and precision manufacturing. Madagascar has developed a large export-oriented garment and apparel industry, supported by its labour force and preferential access to international markets. Seychelles has a more specialised manufacturing sector with commercial tuna processing and canning as well as maritime repair and related activities, reflecting its ocean-based economy. Comoros has a relatively small manufacturing sector with production mainly connected to agricultural products and essential oils such as Ylang-ylang distillation and processing is particularly important because it supplies perfume and other international markets. Burundi manufacturing sector is mainly domestic-oriented and includes mainly agro-processing but still it faces constraints such as limited electricity supply, infrastructure problems and foreign exchange shortages.

Industrial growth has also been accompanied by the expansion of special economic zones, export processing zones and industrial parks across East Africa example Ethiopia has used industrial parks to attract investment in textiles and apparel, Agro-processing and construction materials. Kenya has developed special economic and export-processing zones for manufacturing and logistics while Tanzania and Uganda have established industrial parks and manufacturing zones. Rwanda has concentrated a number of industrial activities within dedicated economic zones. Construction is another major part of the industrial sector and has expanded across much of East Africa due to mainly population growth, urbanisation and housing demand and has created demand for locally produced construction materials such as cement, steel, bricks, glass and other manufactured products. Cement production is particularly important, with Kenya, Tanzania, Uganda, Ethiopia and Rwanda having significant production capacity. New cement plants and expansions have accompanied road construction, housing development, industrial projects and other infrastructure investment.

Mining and mineral processing are also important to East Africa industrial economy with the region having deposits of major minerals such gold, copper, rare-earth minerals and other industrial minerals. Tanzania is an important producer of gold and other minerals while Uganda has expanded its gold and other mineral activities. Kenya has commercially important deposits of soda ash and titanium. Rwanda is a major producer and exporter of tin, tantalum and tungsten minerals while Ethiopia has expanded gold and other mineral production. Madagascar has major deposits of nickel, cobalt, chromite and graphite and has developed a substantial mining and mineral-processing industry. Local processing is increasingly replacing the export of raw and semi-processed minerals allowing countries to generate greater value from their mineral resources

Energy is also a major sub-sector playing an important role in the industrial sector of East Africa. East Africa has considerable hydropower, geothermal, solar, wind and natural gas resources. Ethiopia and Uganda have substantial hydropower resources . Kenya has developed one of the world major geothermal power industries while Tanzania has substantial natural-gas resources. Countries across the region have also expanded solar and wind generation. Reliable and affordable electricity has been particularly important for industrial parks factories, mines and mineral-processing facilities. However industrial development is constrained in some areas by high electricity costs, unreliable power supplies and limited transmission infrastructure.

Industrial activity in East Africa is largely centred around major cities such Nairobi and Mombasa in Kenya, Dar es Salaam in Tanzania, Kampala and Jinja in Uganda, Kigali in Rwanda, Addis Ababa in Ethiopia and Antananarivo in Madagascar while major ports such as Mombasa, Dar es Salaam and Djibouti also play an important role in industrial sector through external and internal trace. The transport corridor connecting these ports to inland industrial centres have consequently become an important part of East Africa industrial infrastructure.

Regional trade has become increasingly relevant to industrial development because some national markets are relatively small for capital-intensive industries. The East African Community has promoted industrialisation and value addition among its members while wider continental integration through the African Continental Free Trade Area provides an additional market for East African manufacturers.

Despite this expansion, the industrial sector faces many challenges including costly electricity and transport, poor infrastructure, limited access to finance, lack of specialised skills, high reliance on imported machinery and intermediate inputs, limited technological capacity and smaller scale of production. Industries also face competition from imports, as well as transport costs and limited access to some overseas markets. Variations in regulations, standards, trade policies and taxes between countries has increased the cost of regional trade and delays in transit and other barriers have hindered the movement of goods and affected supply chains in industry. Concerns related to the environment are also becoming more prominent, partly due to pollution, waste and other impacts associated with the activities such as mining, cement manufacturing and petroleum refining.

== Tourism ==
Tourism is a crucial sector of East Africa's economy, with the region being one of Africa's leading tourist destinations, particularly for safari tourism. Kenya and Tanzania have played pioneering roles in the region's tourism industry, each attracting more than 2 million international visitors. In 2026, East Africa received more than 12 million international visitors, surpassing pre-pandemic levels. Tourism is heavily crucial for the island states of Seychelles and Mauritius, with tourism contributing 46.6% of Seychelles gross domestic product. East African countries have also introduced various reforms to expand and diversify their tourism industries. Kenya and Ethiopia have introduced electronic entry systems, Rwanda has focused on high-value and MICE tourism, Uganda has diversified its tourism products, Seychelles has adopted a value over volume approach, while Mauritius has expanded its tourism portfolio to include ecotourism, wellness, cruise, cultural, and business tourism.

International tourist arrivals in East Africa
Rank	Country	Tourist arrivals	Year	Source
1	Kenya	2,550,600	2025	KNBS
2	Tanzania	2,141,895	2024	MNRT
3	Uganda	1,642,215	2025	MTWA
4	Rwanda	1,490,000	2025	RDB
5	Mauritius	1,436,250	2025	Statistics Mauritius
6	Ethiopia	1,148,000	2023/24	The reporter Ethiopia
7	Sudan	836,000	2018	World Bank / UN Tourism
8	Seychelles	354,034	2025*	Tourism Seychelles
9	Madagascar	330,909	2025	MTA
10	Burundi	286,433	2019	UN Tourism / NationMaster
11	Eritrea	142,000	2016	The Contemporary Tourist Intelligence
12	Somalia	125,000+	2024	Ministry of Information, Culture and Tourism
13	Djibouti	100,072	2024	La Nation
14	Comoros	21,718	2024	Eulerpool
15	South Sudan	—	—	N/A
Total		12,605,126+	14 countries	

== Trade ==
Exports and Imports in East Africa

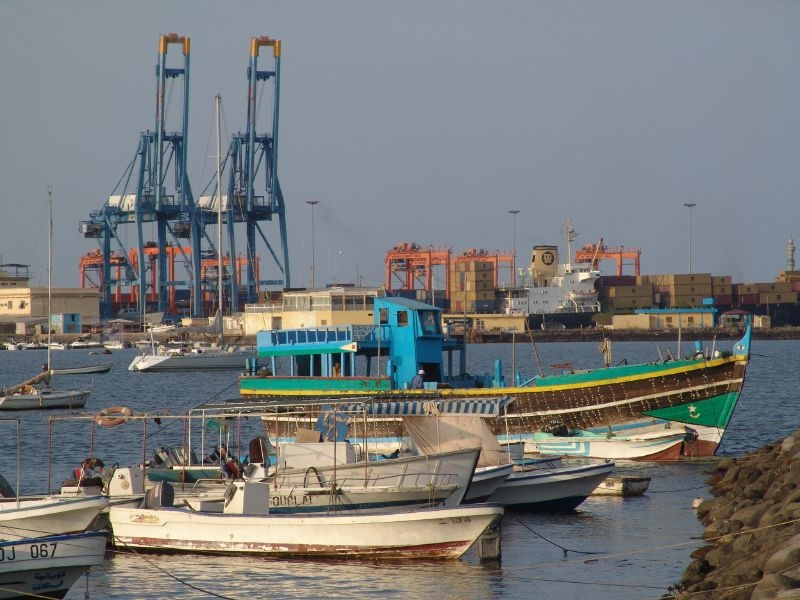
Djibouti Port

In 2024, East Africa recorded $49.129 billion in total exports and $106.761 billion in total imports, giving $155.890 billion in total trade. The top three exporters were Tanzania ($8.702B), Kenya ($8.237B) and Uganda ($7.900B), while the bottom three were Comoros ($0.030B), Burundi ($0.174B) and Seychelles ($0.556B). Only South Sudan (+$0.714B) and Eritrea (+$0.014B) were net exporters. Kenya had the largest total trade ($28.325B), followed by Ethiopia ($25.990B)and Tanzania ($22.981B), while Comoros had the lowest ($0.388B).

Merchandise exports and imports of East African countries, 2024 (US$ billion)
Rank	Country	Exports	Imports	Net exports	Total trade
	East Africa	49.129	106.761	−57.632	155.890
1	Kenya	8.237	20.088	−11.851	28.325
2	Ethiopia	4.501	21.489	−16.988	25.990
3	Tanzania	8.702	14.279	−5.577	22.981
4	Uganda	7.900	14.200	−6.300	22.100
5	Djibouti	5.169	5.546	−0.377	10.715
6	Rwanda	3.201	6.028	−2.827	9.229
7	Mauritius	2.368	6.843	−4.475	9.211
8	Sudan	3.134	4.911	−1.777	8.045
9	Madagascar	2.582	4.833	−2.251	7.415
10	Somalia	1.107	4.017	−2.910	5.124
11	South Sudan	1.694	0.980	+0.714	2.674
12	Seychelles	0.556	1.446	−0.890	2.002
13	Burundi	0.174	1.023	−0.849	1.197
14	Eritrea	0.576	0.562	+0.014	1.138
15	Comoros	0.030	0.358	−0.328	0.388

Trade in East Africa plays a major role in its economy linking the region agricultural , resource-rich and other industries to regional and global markets supported by the region strategic location and extensive transport networks e.g major ports particularly Mombasa in Kenya and Dar es Salaam in Tanzania. Smaller economies such as Djibouti also play important roles because of their strategic geographic and logistical positions.

Trade in East Africa is enhanced by several regional economic integration initiatives including the East African Community (EAC), the Common Market for Eastern and Southern Africa (COMESA), the Southern African Development Community (SADC) and the African Continental Free Trade Area (AfCFTA) which help reduce trade barriers, improve market access and strengthen economic integration among participating countries.

The region has major transport corridors which connect coastal ports with the landlocked countries of the interior such as the Northern Corridor centred on the port of Mombasa connects Kenya with Uganda, Rwanda, Burundi, South Sudan and eastern DR Congo, The Central Corridor centred on the port of Dar es Salaam provides another major trade route into the landlocked countries of East and Central Africa.

East Africa export structure reflects the region large agricultural, mineral and natural-resource bases with its main exports including mainly Coffee, Tea , Horticultural products, gold and other minerals etc. Tanzania exports include gold and other minerals, agricultural products and manufactured goods. Kenya has a comparatively diversified export base that includes agricultural products manufactured goods and services while Uganda's exports include gold, coffee and agricultural commodities.

East Africa merchandise imports are considerably larger than its exports with Ethiopia having the largest import bill, at approximately US$21.489 billion followed by Kenya at US$20.088 billion, Tanzania at US$14.279 billion and Uganda at US$14.200 billion. Ethiopia was also a significant exporter with exports of approximately US$4.501 billion although its much larger import bill resulted in a merchandise trade deficit of about US$16.987 billion.

Djibouti merchandise exports of about US$5.169 billion are large relative to its small domestic economy because of strategic location at the entrance to the Red Sea and its role as a regional logistics and transport hub contribute to its importance in East African trade.

Despite progress in regional integration trade within East Africa continues to face several barriers including border delays, differences in standards and regulations, customs procedures, high transport costs etc , The World Bank's 2026 assessment of African integration found that about 60% of estimated trade costs arise behind national borders including customs inefficiencies, weak logestics, transport restrictions, fragmented standards and restrictions affecting services.

=== Intraregional trade ===
Intraregional Trade in East Africa (2012-2017)

Trade between the regional members is an important part of greater economic integration in Eastern Africa. However, there remains strong reliance on external markets outside the region by most countries. According to AFDB in 2017, only 17.3% of the entire Eastern Africa region's total exports were to other countries within the region, down from 18.9% in 2012 but slightly above the Africa region's 16.6% average share. Within the EAC, however, the share was higher at more than 20%, although still below the 25% target set by the region for 2025. Countries with the largest shares included Kenya (25.1%) and Uganda (40.2%) in 2017. Tariffs, non-tariff barriers, transport costs and poor trade complementarities have acted as impediments.

== See also ==
- Economy of Comoros
- Economy of Djibouti
- Economy of Eritrea
- Economy of Ethiopia
- Economy of Kenya
- Economy of Madagascar
- Economy of Mauritius
- Economy of Rwanda
- Economy of Seychelles
- Economy of Somalia
- Economy of South Sudan
- Economy of Sudan
- Economy of Tanzania
- Economy of Uganda
- Economy of Burundi
