= List of central banks of Africa =

Usage of: West African CFA franc Central African CFA franc

There are two African currency unions associated with multinational central banks; the West African Banque Centrale des États de l'Afrique de l'Ouest (BCEAO) and the Central African Banque des États de l'Afrique Centrale (BEAC). Members of both currency unions use the CFA Franc as their legal tender.

Below is a list of the central banks and currencies of Africa.

Country	Currency	Central bank	Peg
Benin	West African CFA franc	Central Bank of West African States	1 EUR = XOF 655.957
Burkina Faso	West African CFA franc	Central Bank of West African States	1 EUR = XOF 655.957
Guinea-Bissau	West African CFA franc	Central Bank of West African States	1 EUR = XOF 655.957
Ivory Coast	West African CFA franc	Central Bank of West African States	1 EUR = XOF 655.957
Mali	West African CFA franc	Central Bank of West African States	1 EUR = XOF 655.957
Niger	West African CFA franc	Central Bank of West African States	1 EUR = XOF 655.957
Senegal	West African CFA franc	Central Bank of West African States	1 EUR = XOF 655.957
Togo	West African CFA franc	Central Bank of West African States	1 EUR = XOF 655.957
Cameroon	Central African CFA franc	Bank of Central African States	1 EUR= XAF 655.957
Central African Republic	Central African CFA franc	Bank of Central African States	1 EUR= XAF 655.957
Chad	Central African CFA franc	Bank of Central African States	1 EUR= XAF 655.957
Equatorial Guinea	Central African CFA franc	Bank of Central African States	1 EUR= XAF 655.957
Gabon	Central African CFA franc	Bank of Central African States	1 EUR= XAF 655.957
Republic of the Congo	Central African CFA franc	Bank of Central African States	1 EUR= XAF 655.957
Algeria	Algerian dinar	Bank of Algeria	
Angola	Angolan kwanza	Banco Nacional de Angola	
Botswana	Botswana pula	Bank of Botswana	
Burundi	Burundian franc	Bank of the Republic of Burundi	
Cape Verde	Cape Verdean escudo	Bank of Cape Verde	1 EUR = CVE$110.265
Comoros	Comorian franc	Central Bank of the Comoros	1 EUR = 491.96775 francs
Democratic Republic of the Congo	Congolese franc	Central Bank of the Congo	
Djibouti	Djiboutian franc	Central Bank of Djibouti	US$1 = 177.721 francs
Egypt	Egyptian pound	Central Bank of Egypt	
Eritrea	Eritrean nakfa	Bank of Eritrea	US$1 = 15 nakfa
Ethiopia	Ethiopian birr	National Bank of Ethiopia	
Gambia	Gambian dalasi	Central Bank of The Gambia	
Ghana	Ghanaian cedi	Bank of Ghana	
Guinea	Guinean franc	Central Bank of the Republic of Guinea	
Kenya	Kenyan shilling	Central Bank of Kenya	
Lesotho	Lesotho loti	Central Bank of Lesotho	ZAR at par
Liberia	Liberian dollar	Central Bank of Liberia	
Libya	Libyan dinar	Central Bank of Libya	
Madagascar	Malagasy ariary	Central Bank of Madagascar	
Malawi	Malawian kwacha	Reserve Bank of Malawi	
Mauritania	Mauritanian ouguiya	Central Bank of Mauritania	
Mauritius	Mauritian rupee	Bank of Mauritius	
Morocco	Moroccan dirham	Bank Al-Maghrib	
Mozambique	Mozambican metical	Bank of Mozambique	
Namibia	Namibian dollar	Bank of Namibia	ZAR at par
Nigeria	Nigerian naira	Central Bank of Nigeria	
Rwanda	Rwandan franc	National Bank of Rwanda	
São Tomé and Príncipe	São Tomé and Príncipe dobra	National Bank of São Tomé and Príncipe	1 EUR = 24.5 STN
Seychelles	Seychellois rupee	Central Bank of Seychelles	
Sierra Leone	Sierra Leonean leone	Bank of Sierra Leone	
Somalia	Somali shilling	Central Bank of Somalia	
Somaliland	Somaliland shilling	Bank of Somaliland	
South Africa	South African rand	South African Reserve Bank	
South Sudan	South Sudanese pound	Bank of South Sudan	
Sudan	Sudanese pound	Bank of Sudan	
Eswatini	Swazi lilangeni	Central Bank of Swaziland	ZAR at par
Tanzania	Tanzanian shilling	Bank of Tanzania	
Tunisia	Tunisian dinar	Central Bank of Tunisia	
Uganda	Ugandan shilling	Bank of Uganda	
Zambia	Zambian kwacha	Bank of Zambia	
Zimbabwe	Zimbabwe Gold	Reserve Bank of Zimbabwe	

== See also ==
- Africa
- Economy of Africa
- United Nations Economic Commission for Latin America and the Caribbean
- List of African stock exchanges
- List of currencies in Africa
