= Coins of Madagascar =

This is a list of coins of Madagascar.

== Malagasy Republic ==
Image		Denomination	Years		Technical parameters				Description / Legend / Designer		
Obverse	Reverse		From	To	Diameter	Thickness	Mass	Composition	Edge	Obverse	Reverse
		1 franc	1965	1993				Stainless steel			Zebu
		2 francs	1965	1989				Stainless steel	Plain		Zebu
		5 francs (ariary)	1966	1989				Stainless steel	Plain	Pointsetta	Zebu
		10 francs (2 ariary)	1970	1989				Aluminium-bronze	Plain	Vanilla plant	Zebu
		10 francs (2 ariary)	1991					Copper plated steel			FAO series, zebu
		20 francs (4 ariary)	1970	1989				Aluminium-bronze	Plain	Cotton plant	FAO series, zebu
These images are to scale at 2.5 pixels per millimetre. For table standards, see the coin specification table.

== Democratic Republic ==
Image		Denomination	Years		Technical parameters				Description / Legend / Designer		
Obverse	Reverse		From	To	Diameter	Thickness	Mass	Composition	Edge	Obverse	Reverse
		5 ariary	1992					Copper plated steel	Reeded		Rice
		10 ariary	1978					Nickel			
		10 ariary	1983					Copper-nickel			
		20 ariary	1978					Nickel	Reeded		
Similar	Similar	20 ariary	1983					Copper-nickel			
		50 ariary	1992					Stainless steel			
These images are to scale at 2.5 pixels per millimetre. For table standards, see the coin specification table.

== Republic of Madagascar ==
Image		Denomination	Years		Technical parameters				Description / Legend / Designer		
Obverse	Reverse		From	To	Diameter	Thickness	Mass	Composition	Edge	Obverse	Reverse
		1 ariary (5 francs)	1996					Stainless steel			
		2 ariary (10 francs)	1996					Copper plated steel			
		2 ariary (10 francs)	2003					Bronze			Lemur
		5 ariary	1994	1996				Copper plated steel			Rice
		10 ariary	1999					Stainless steel			Farmer
		20 ariary	1999					Nickel clad steel			
		50 ariary	1994	1996				Stainless steel			
These images are to scale at 2.5 pixels per millimetre. For table standards, see the coin specification table.
