= Comorian franc =

Currency of the Comoros

franc comorien (French); فرنك قمري (Arabic)

ISO 4217
- Code: KMF (numeric: 174)

Units of account
- Symbol: FC
- Subunit
- 1/100: centime no longer used

Denominations
- Banknotes: 500 FC, 1,000 FC, 2,000 FC, 5,000 FC, 10,000 FC
- Coins
- Freq. used: 25 FC, 50 FC, 100 FC, 250 FC
- Rarely used: 1 FC, 2 FC, 5 FC, 10 FC

Demographics
- User(s): Comoros

Issuance
- Central bank: Central Bank of the Comoros
- Website: www.banque-comores.km
- Printer: Banque de France
- Website: www.banque-france.fr
- Mint: Monnaie de Paris
- Website: www.monnaiedeparis.com

Valuation
- Inflation: 6.3%
- Source: The World Factbook, 2012 est.
- Pegged with: euro = 491.96775 francs

The franc (French: franc comorien; Arabic: فرنك قمري; sign: FC; ISO 4217 code: KMF) is the official currency of Comoros. It is nominally subdivided into 100 centimes, although no centime denominations have ever been issued.

== History ==
The French franc became the currency of Comoros after the islands became a French protectorate in 1886. In 1891, Sultan Said Ali bin Said Omar of Grande Comore (Ngazidja) issued coins denominated in centimes and francs which circulated alongside French currency. In 1912, the Comoros became a province of Madagascar, which was also a French possession. French banknotes and coins circulated in the colony. Apart from an emergency issue of small change notes in 1920, the French currency circulated alone until 1925.

On 1 July 1925, the French government formed an agreement with the Banque de Paris et des Pays-Bas to create the Banque de Madagascar, headquartered in Paris, and granted it a private monopoly to issue currency for the colony of Madagascar. The Malagasy franc (French: franc malgache) was equivalent to the French franc and French coins continued to circulate as Madagascar had no coins of its own until 1943.

When the Comoros became a separate French territory in 1945, the name of the issuing bank was changed to the Banque de Madagascar et des Comores (still headquartered in Paris). A branch office opened in Comoros in 1953. While the banknotes were changed to reflect the new status of Comoros, the coins were not changed and bore only the name Madagascar. On 26 December 1945, the Madagascar-Comores CFA franc was established and its value was fixed at 1.7 French francs. Old Madagascar coins and banknotes continued to circulate as this new currency. On 17 October 1948, the CFA franc was revalued to 2 French francs.

In 1950, the French government took over majority ownership of the Banque de Madagascar et des Comores. On 1 January 1960, the French franc was redenominated, with 100 old francs becoming 1 new franc. (Décret n°59-1450 du 22 décembre 1959) The new exchange rate was 1 Madagascar-Comores CFA franc = 0.02 French francs (50 Madagascar-Comores CFA francs = 1 French franc).

On 26 June 1960, Madagascar gained independence from France, and the Institut d'Émission Malgache (headquartered in Antananarivo) was created to issue currency only for Madagascar. Madagascar left the CFA zone effective 1 July 1973.

On 23 November 1979, the government of Comoros signed the Accord de coopération monétaire entre la République Française et la République fédérale islamique des Comores, a monetary cooperation agreement with France, making Comoros part of the franc zone (but not part of the CFA franc zone). This agreement provided for the establishment of a system of fixed parity between the French franc and the Comorian franc and free convertibility between the two currencies, guaranteed by the Comorian central bank's opening of an operations account (compte d'operation) at the French Treasury (Trésor public) to handle all exchange transactions. Sixty-five percent of the foreign exchange reserves of Comoros are held in euros in this account. This account is similar to overnight deposits with the French Treasury: it may bear interest and may, in special circumstances, post a negative balance. However, to prevent this account from showing a lasting overdraft, a number of preventative measures have been set up.

The stability of the Comorian franc is founded on tight monetary and credit discipline, underpinned by two specific safeguard measures: the central bank is required to maintain 20% foreign-exchange cover of its sight liabilities, and the government is not allowed to draw more than 20% of the previous year's budget receipts from their central bank funds. The ministers of finance of the franc area (France, the CFA zone and Comoros) meet biannually. The agreement between France and the Comoros is essentially the same as the agreement France has with the CFA Zone. It is a continuation of a relationship of monetary cooperation between the two countries that has existed for more than a century.

Until 1994, the Comorian franc was pegged to the French franc at the rate of 50 Comorian francs to 1 French franc. This was changed on 12 January 1994, when the currency was devalued in concert with the CFA franc devaluation. However, the Comorian franc was devalued 33 1/3% to a new rate of 75 Comorian francs for 1 French franc, while the CFA franc's new rate was 100 CFA francs to 1 French franc. With the creation of the euro in January 1999, the Comorian franc was pegged, at its prevailing rate, to the new currency. The exchange rate is now 491.96775 Comorian francs to 1 euro.

=== European Monetary Union ===
In 1998 in anticipation of European Monetary Union, the Council of the European Union addressed the monetary agreements France has with the CFA Zone and Comoros and ruled that:

- the agreements are unlikely to have any material effect on the monetary and exchange rate policy of the Euro zone
- in their present forms and states of implementation, the agreements are unlikely to present any obstacle to a smooth functioning of economic and monetary union
- nothing in the agreements can be construed as implying an obligation for the European Central Bank (ECB) or any national central bank to support the convertibility of the CFA and Comorian francs
- modifications to the existing agreements will not lead to any obligations for the European Central or any national central bank
- the French Treasury will guarantee the free convertibility at a fixed parity between the euro and the CFA and Comorian francs
- the competent French authorities shall keep the European Commission, the European Central Bank and the Economic and Financial Committee informed about the implementation of the agreements and inform the Committee prior to changes of the parity between the euro and the CFA and Comorian francs
- any change to the nature or scope of the agreements would require Council approval on the basis of a Commission recommendation and ECB consultation

== Central Bank ==
The statutes of the Central Bank of the Comoros (Banque Centrale des Comores / البنك المركزي القمري Al-Bank al-Markazi al-Qomori) state that its board of directors shall have eight members who are chosen from the Comorian Government, the French Central Bank (Banque de France) and the French government. The post of deputy director of the Central Bank of the Comoros is held by a Banque de France official, who is responsible for monetary policy. Since 19 November 1999, all the central bank's official rates have been pegged to the Euro Overnight Index Average (EONIA) leading to a stabilisation of interest rate differentials with the euro. The BCC applies a compulsory reserves system (30% of deposits) and a bank monitoring system. The headquarters are located in Moroni, and the current bank governor is Mer Said Ahmed Said Ali.

== Coins ==
In 1890, Sultan Said Ali of Bambao, Ngazidja issued bronze 5 and 10 centimes and silver 5 francs. The coins were struck in Paris to the same specifications as the corresponding French coins. The three coins ceased to be valid in theory in 1912 but the lower two denominations were still turning up in general circulation as late as 1930. The two bronze coins are frequently used for magico-religious purposes. All three coins bore similar inscriptions, including the date 1308 AH, which corresponds to the Gregorian calendar years 1890/91 AD.

In the 1920s, a shortage of coins led to the issuance of private tokens by the principal colonial company on Ngazidja and a sugar plantation on Mayotte. Denominations included 25 and 50 centimes and 1 and 2 francs. Aluminium and bronze were used in these tokens.

50 francs, 1975

100 francs, 1977

In 1964, coins were introduced specifically for use in the Comoros, replacing the Madagascar coins previously in use. Aluminium 1 FC, 2 FC, and 5 FC and aluminium-bronze 10 FC and 20 FC coins were issued. In 1975, nickel 50 francs were introduced, followed by nickel 100 FC in 1977 and nickel 25 FC in 1981. Nickel-plated-steel replaced nickel after 1990. The Institut d'Émission des Comores issued coins between 1975 and 1977, whilst the Central Bank has issued coins since 1981.

Until 1975, only French appeared on Comorian coins. Since then, Comorian has also been used.

Coins of the Comorian franc
Obverse	Reverse	Denomination	Weight (grams)	Diameter	Composition
		1 franc		23 mm	Composition
		2 francs	2.2	27 mm	Composition
		5 francs	3.75	31 mm	Composition
		10 francs		22 mm	aluminum bronze
		25 francs	3.9	20 mm	nickel
		50 francs	6	24 mm	nickel
		100 francs	10	28 mm	nickel-plated steel

General circulation Comorian coins have always been minted by the Monnaie de Paris. This is indicated by the cornucopia mint mark on the coins, visible to the left of the date, although this was omitted from the 1994 50 FC piece at the request of the Comorian government. The coins are manufactured at their facility in Pessac, Gironde.

The 5 FC coin is nicknamed reali, referring to the Spanish real; the 2 FC coin is nicknamed nusu, meaning "half", and the 1 FC coin "robo", meaning "quarter". The 1 FC, 2 FC, 5 FC and 10 FC coins are rarely used because of their low value. The 25 FC and 100 FC coins contain the phrase "Augmentons la production alimentaire" (Let's increase food production). The 5 FC coin contains the phrase "Conférence Mondiale sur les Pêches" (World Conference on Fishing). Both of these phrases are references to programs by the United Nations Food and Agriculture Organization. Comoros is one of 114 countries that have issued FAO coins.

== Banknotes ==
The first Comorian paper money was issued in 1920. It consisted of an emergency issue of Madagascar postage stamps fixed to card to allow them to circulate as money. Denominations of 50 centimes and 1 franc were issued.

Loi ordinaire 62-873 du 31 juillet 1962, Article 12, allowed the Banque de Madagascar et des Comores to continue issuing notes in Comoros after Madagascar began issuing its own currency but, beginning 1 April 1962, they had "COMORES" overstamped on them. Denominations of 50 FC, 100 FC, 500 FC, 1,000 FC and 5,000 FC were issued. As per Décret 64-1038 du 07 octobre 1964, banknotes without the overstamp ceased to be legal tender on 31 December 1964.

500 FC note from 1981. The white circle contains a watermark.

The overstamped notes circulated until 1976, when 500 FC, 1,000 FC and 5,000 FC were introduced by the Institut d'Émission des Comores, the 50 FC and 100 FC notes being replaced by coins. The central Bank took over production of paper money in 1984. 2,500 FC and 10,000 FC notes were introduced in 1997, followed by 2,000 FC in 2005. The 2,500 FC note was demonetized on 31 January 2007.

Comorian banknotes are printed by the Banque de France at their paper mill in Vic-le-Comte and their printing works in Chamalières, both in Puy-de-Dôme, Auvergne. The 500 FC, 1,000 FC, 2,000 FC, 5,000 FC, and 10,000 FC notes dated 2005 and 2006 contain the EURion constellation, along with other improved security features to make them more difficult to counterfeit.

All Comorian franc banknotes

== Exchange rates ==
Current KMF exchange rates
From Google Finance:	AUD CAD CHF CNY EUR GBP HKD JPY USD ZAR INR
From Yahoo! Finance:	AUD CAD CHF CNY EUR GBP HKD JPY USD ZAR INR
From XE.com:	AUD CAD CHF CNY EUR GBP HKD JPY USD ZAR INR
From OANDA:	AUD CAD CHF CNY EUR GBP HKD JPY USD ZAR INR

== See also ==
- Malagasy franc
- CFA franc
- CFP franc
- Currencies related to the euro

- History of Comoros
- Economy of Comoros
- Economy of Mayotte
- Economy of Africa
