= Central Bank of the Comoros =

Monetary Authority of Comoros

Central Bank of the Comoros Banque Centrale des Comores (BCC)

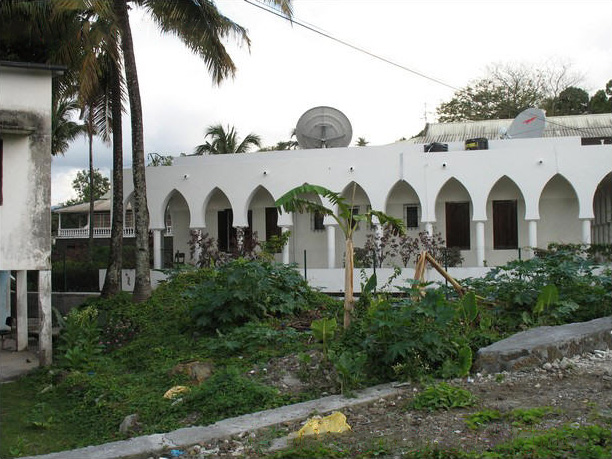
- Central Bank in Moroni
- Headquarters: Moroni, Comoros
- Established: 1 July 1981
- Ownership: 100% state ownership
- President: Younoussa Imani
- Central bank of: Comoros
- Currency: Comorian franc KMF (ISO 4217)
- Reserves: 180 million USD
- Preceded by: Institut d'Émission des Comores
- Website: www.banque-comores.km

The Central Bank of the Comros (Arabic: البنك المركزي لجزر القمر, French: Banque Centrale des Comores; BCC) is the national central bank of the Comoros, a group of islands in the Indian Ocean.

== Operations ==
The statutes of the BCC state that its board of directors shall have eight members who are chosen from the Comorian Government, the French Central Bank (Banque de France) and the French government. The Central Bank was formerly responsible for administering the currency under the CFA Franc model. The post of Deputy Director of the Central Bank of the Comoros is held by a Banque de France official, who is responsible for monetary policy. Since 19 November 1999, all the central bank's official rates have been pegged to the Euro Overnight Index Average (EONIA) leading to a stabilisation of interest rate differentials with the euro.

The BCC applies a compulsory reserves system, formerly 30% of deposits but reduced to 25% in 2011, and a bank monitoring system. The headquarters are located in Moroni.

== Banking system ==
The Comorian banking system is constituted of six different banks: the Central Bank (BCC); the Banque pour l'Industrie et le Commerce des Comores (BICC), the Banque de Développement des Comores (BDC), the Banque Fédérale de Commerce (BFC), the Exim Bank Comores SA and the Société Nationale des Postes et des Services Financiers (SNPSF). In addition, two mutual savings banks (SANDUK and MECK) play a role.

One of the roles of the Central Bank of the Comoros is to approve the establishment of new banks on all three islands of the Union of Comoros (Grande-Comore, Anjouan and Mohéli).

== Governors ==
The governor is appointed for a five-year term.

Name	Took office	Left office	
Said Mohamed Mshangama	1978	1981	director
Mohamed Halifa	1981	1996	
Said Ahmed Said Ali	1996	2002	
Ibrahim Ben Ali	2002	2005	
Ahamadi Abdoulbastoi	2005	2010	
Mzé Abdou Mohamed Chanfiou	2011	2017	
Younoussa Imani	2017	Incumbent	

== See also ==
- Minister of Finance and Budget (Comoros)
- Banque de Madagascar
- Central banks and currencies of Africa
- Economy of Comoros
- List of banks in the Arab world
- List of central banks
- Comorian franc
- Institut d'Émission
- List of financial supervisory authorities by country
