= Iraimbilanja =

Currency unit of Madagascar

The iraimbilanja (singular and plural) is the basic division of the currency of Madagascar, equal to one fifth of an ariary.

== Etymology ==
Iraimbilanja literally means "one iron weight", and was the name of an old coin worth 1/5 of an ariary.

== Value ==
The old Malagasy franc is equal in value to one iraimbilanja. As of 21 July 2025, the value of one iraimbilanja was US$0.00022, or 22 one-thousandths of a cent.
