= Economy of the Comoros =

Economy of Comoros
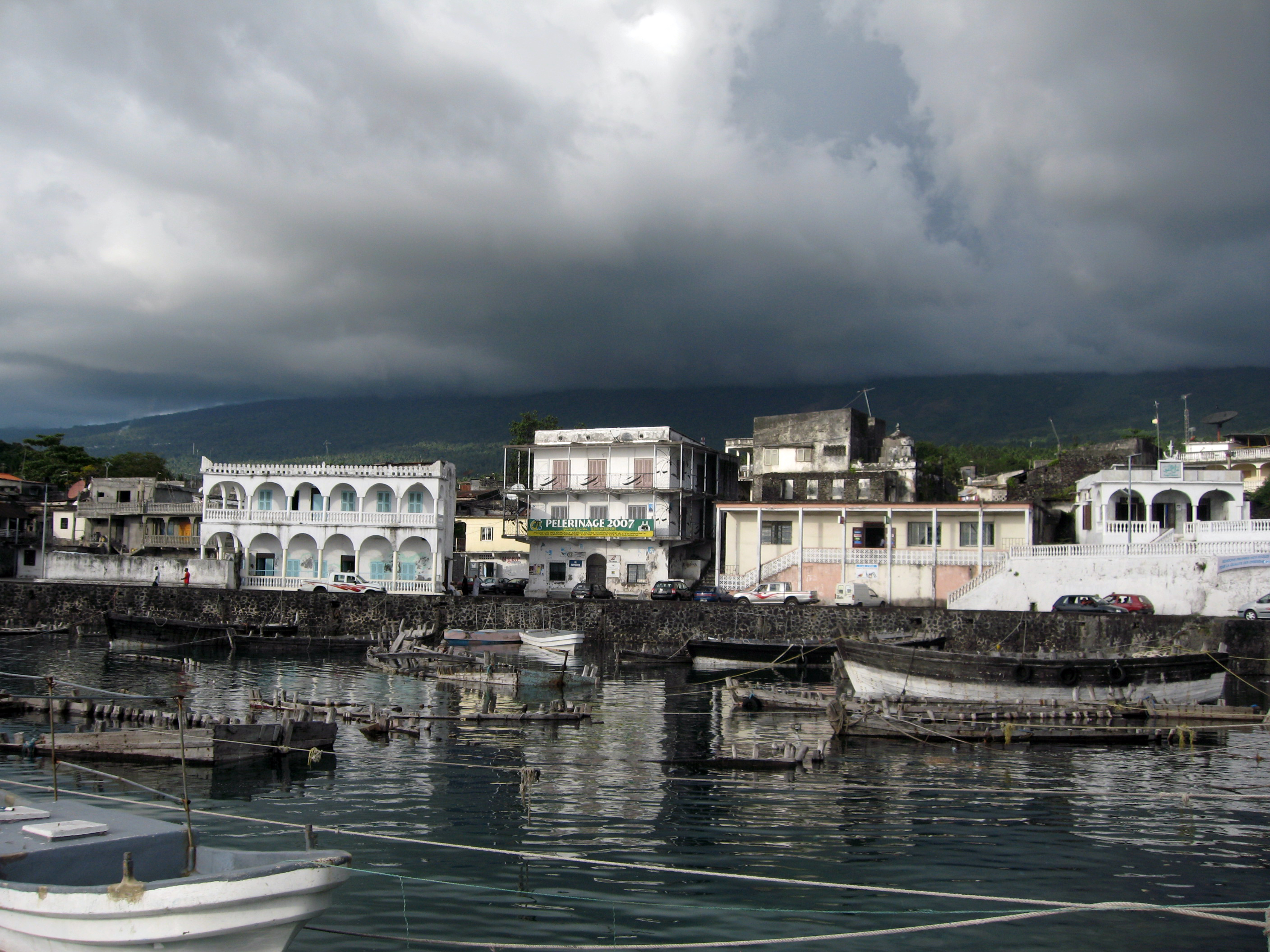
- Capital of Comoros Moroni
- Currency: Comorian franc
- Fiscal year: calendar year
- Trade organisations: AU, AfCFTA (signed), WTO (observer)
- Country group: Least developed; Lower-middle income economy

Statistics
- GDP: ▲$1.55 billion (nominal; 2025); ▲$3.66 billion (PPP; 2025)
- GDP rank: 180th (nominal; 2025); 179th (PPP; 2025)
- GDP growth: ▼3.8% (2025); ▲4.3% (2026f)
- GDP per capita: ▲$1,700 (nominal; 2025); ▲$4,020 (PPP; 2025)
- GDP per capita rank: 156th (nominal; 2025); 160th (PPP; 2025)
- GDP by sector: agriculture: 50.0%; industry: 10.0%; services: 40.0% (2011 est.)
- Inflation (CPI): 1.749% (2018)
- Population below national poverty line: 60% (2002 est.)
- Gini coefficient: N/A
- Labour force: 268,500 (2007 est.)
- Labour force by occupation: agriculture: 80%, industry and services: 20% (1996 est.)
- Unemployment: 20% (1996 est.)
- Main industries: fishing, tourism, perfume distillation

External
- Exports: $19.6 million (205th, 2012 est.)
- Export goods: vanilla, ylang-ylang (perfume essence), cloves, copra
- Main export partners: Indonesia 24.6%; Bangladesh 23%; Turkey 16.3%; UAE 10.9% (2023 est.)
- Imports: $208 million (206th, 2012 est.)
- Import goods: rice and other foodstuffs, consumer goods, petroleum products, cement, transport equipment
- Main import partners: Hong Kong 24.4%; UAE 20.8%; Tanzania 12%; France 6.68% (2022 est.)
- FDI stock: N/A
- Gross external debt: $136.1 million (189th, 31 December 2012)

Public finance
- Government debt: N/A
- Revenue: N/A
- Spending: N/A
- All values, unless otherwise stated, are in US dollars.

Comoros has a developing economy based on subsistence agriculture and fishing. It has inadequate transportation links, a young and rapidly increasing population, and few natural resources. The low educational level of the labor force contributes to a subsistence level of economic activity, high unemployment, and a heavy dependence on foreign grants and technical assistance. The Comoros, with an estimated gross domestic product (GDP) per capita income of about $700, is among the world's poorest and least developed nations. Although the quality of the land differs from island to island, most of the widespread lava-encrusted soil formations are unsuited to agriculture. As a result, most of the inhabitants make their living from subsistence agriculture and fishing. Average wages in 2007 hover around $3–4 per day.

Agriculture, including fishing, hunting, and forestry, is the leading sector of the economy. It contributes 40% to GDP, employs 80% of the labor force, and provides most of the exports. The country is not self-sufficient in food production; rice, the main staple, accounts for the bulk of imports.

The government is working to upgrade education and technical training, to privatize commercial and industrial enterprises, to improve health services, to diversify exports, to promote tourism, and to reduce the high population growth rate. Continued foreign support is essential if the goal of 4% annual GDP growth is to be met. At 24 percent of GDP, remittances constitute an important source of inflows for the Comorian economy. The GDP per capita of the Comoros grew 55% in the 1980s, but this proved unsustainable and it consequently shrank by 42% in the 1990s.

== Economic history ==
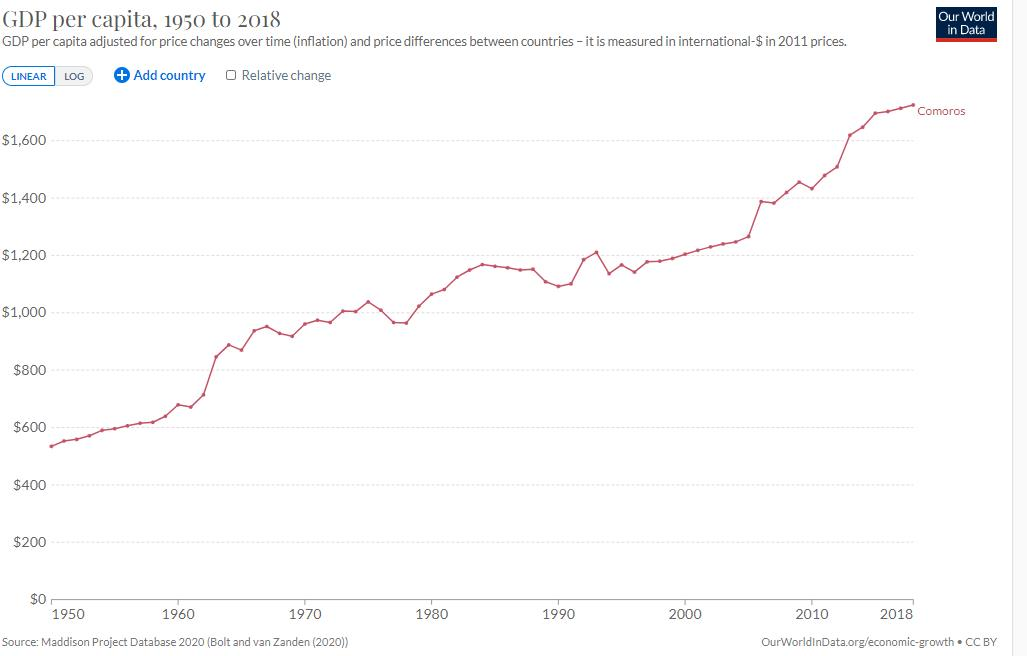
GDP per capita development, since 1950

During the colonial period, the French and local leading citizens established plantations to grow cash crops for export. Even after independence, French companies, such as Société Bambao and Établissements Grimaldi — and other concerns, such as Kalfane and Company and later, President Abdallah's Établissements Abdallah et Fils—dominated the Comoran economy. These firms diverted most of their profits overseas, investing little in the infrastructure of the islands beyond what was needed for profitable management of the plantations, or what could benefit these businesses' associates or related concerns. A serious consequence of this approach has been the languishing of the food-crop agricultural sector and the resultant dependence on overseas food imports, particularly rice. In 1993 the Comoros remained hostage to fluctuating prices on the international market for such crops as vanilla, ylang-ylang, and cloves.

The Comoros is one of the world's poorest countries; its per capita gross national product (GNP—see Glossary) was estimated at US$400 in 1994, following the January devaluation of the Comorian franc. Although GNP increased in real terms at an average annual rate of 3.1 percent during the 1980s, rapid population growth effaced these gains and caused an average annual decrease in per capita GNP of 0.6 percent. Gross domestic product (GDP—see Glossary) grew in real terms by 4.2 percent per year from 1980 to 1985, 1.8 percent from 1985 to 1988, and 1.5 percent in 1990. In 1991, because of its balance of payments difficulties, the Comoros became eligible for the IDA's Special Program of Assistance for debt-distressed countries of sub-Saharan Africa.

The economy is based on private ownership, frequently by foreign investors. Nationalization, even during the Soilih years, has been limited. Soilih did expropriate the facilities of a foreign oil company, but only after the government of Madagascar took over the company's plants in that country. The Abdallah government, despite its openness to foreign participation in the economy, nationalized the Société Bambao and another French-capitalized firm, the Comoran Meat Company (Société Comorienne des Viandes—Socovia), which specialized in sales of meat and other foods in the islands. The nationalization was short-lived, however, because Socovia and other government-held enterprises were either liquidated or privatized as part of economic restructuring efforts in 1992.

Following the Abdallah regime's rapprochement with France in 1978, the Comoran economy became increasingly dependent on infusions of French aid, along with assistance from other governments and international organizations. By 1990, the year the Comoros concluded negotiations with the IMF for an economic restructuring program, the republic's total external public debt was US$162.4 million, an amount equal to about three-quarters of GNP. The government delayed implementing the structural adjustment plan and was directed by the World Bank and the IMF to do so by September 1992. The plan recommendations entailed discharging about 2,800 of 9,000 civil servants, among other unpopular measures. The IMF granted the Comoros a new credit for US$1.9 million in March 1994 under the Structural Adjustment Facility. For the period 1994–96, the Comoros sought an economic growth rate of 4 percent as well as an inflation rate of 4 percent for 1995–96. The growth rate for 1994, however, was estimated only at 0.7 percent and the inflation rate at 15 percent. Meanwhile, in a move designed to encourage private enterprise and reduce unemployment, in May 1993 the UN Development Programme had given the Comoros a credit of US$2 million for programs in these areas. In January 1994, the European Development Fund (EDF) granted 1.3 million European Currency Units (ECUs; for value, see Glossary) to the Comoros to develop small businesses. The Comoros also received 5.7 million French francs from the French Aid and Cooperation Fund for agriculture and rural development.

The results of foreign aid to the Comoros have been mixed at best. The purposes of the aid ranged from helping the government cover its payroll for such huge, seemingly endless projects as expanding the seaport at Moroni and developing a new port at Mutsamuda on Nzwani. Neither project had shown much promise by early 1994. Meanwhile, the islands have been unable to develop local resources or create the infrastructure needed for economic development. The few successes included the creation of national news media and limited improvements in public health, education, and telecommunications. Developmental assistance from the United States, which totaled US$700,000 in fiscal year (FY—see Glossary) 1991, was administered by CARE, the nongovernmental organization, and focused primarily on reforestation, soil conservation, and sustainable agriculture.

The Comoros has officially participated in the African Franc Zone (Communauté Financière Africaine—CFA; see Glossary) since 1979. The CFA franc equaled one French franc.

A national labor organization, the Union of Comoran Workers (Union des Travailleurs des Comores), also had headquarters in Moroni. Strikes and worker demonstrations often occurred in response to political crises, economic restructuring mandated by international financial organizations, and the failure of the government — occasionally for months at a time — to pay civil servants. Mean wages were $0.80 per man-hour in 2009.

== Macroeconomic trend ==
=== Main indicators ===
The following table shows the main economic indicators in 1980-2026. Inflation below 5% is in green.

Year	GDP			GDP growth (real)	Inflation	Government debt (% of GDP)
Year	Total (bil. US$ PPP)	Per capita (US$ PPP)	Total (bil. US$ nominal)	GDP growth (real)	Inflation	Government debt (% of GDP)
1980	0.4	1130	0.2	▲7.4	▲13.3	n/a
1985	▲0.6	▲1585	0.2	▲2.8	▲8.4	▲142.8
1990	▲0.8	▲1874	▲0.4	▲7.3	▲ -7.4	▼108.1
1995	▲1.0	▲1975	0.4	▲5.6	▲3.1	▼77.7
2000	▲1.1	▲2043	▼0.3	▼ -1.0	▲5.9	▼60.7
2005	▲1.5	▲2541	▲0.7	▲5.7	▲3.0	▼39.9
2006	1.5	▼2522	0.7	▼ -1.8	▲3.4	▼38.5
2007	▲1.6	▲2560	▲0.8	▲0.8	▲4.5	▼36.2
2008	▲1.7	▲2658	▲0.9	▲4.0	▲4.8	▼33.4
2009	1.7	▲2706	0.9	▲3.2	▲4.8	▼31.8
2010	▲1.8	▲2783	0.9	▲3.8	▲3.9	▼30.1
2011	▲1.9	▲2896	▲1.0	▲4.1	▲2.2	▼27.6
2012	▲2.0	▲2979	1.0	▲3.2	▲5.9	▼25
2013	▲2.2	▲3098	▲1.1	▲4.5	▲0.4	▼10.5
2014	▲2.3	▲3150	▲1.2	▲2.1	▲0.0	▲12
2015	2.3	▼3147	▼1.0	▲1.1	▲0.9	▲13.6
2016	▲2.4	▲3212	1.0	▲3.3	▲0.8	▲15.7
2017	▲2.5	▲3326	▲1.1	▲3.8	▲0.1	▲19.4
2018	2.5	▼3256	▲1.2	▲3.6	▲1.7	▼17.5
2019	▲2.6	▲3275	1.2	▲1.8	▲3.7	▲22.4
2020	2.6	▼3229	1.2	▼ -0.2	▲0.8	▲25.5
2021	▲2.8	▲3364	▲1.3	▲2.0	▲0.0	▲27.9
2022	▲3.0	▲3570	▼1.2	▲2.6	▲12.4	▲30.2
2023	▲3.2	▲3729	▲1.3	▲3.0	▲8.5	▲31.5
2024	▲3.4	▲3862	▲1.4	▲3.3	▲5.0	▼30
2025	▲3.7	▲4031	▲1.6	▲3.8	▲3.2	▼29.5
2026	▲3.9	▲4223	▲1.8	▲4.1	▲3.7	▲32.4

== Agriculture, fishing, and forestry ==
Agriculture contributed 36,6% to the GDP in 2024 and provides most of the exports, with cloves alone accounting for 64,9% in 2023. The sector, which involves more than 80% of the population, provides virtually all foreign exchange earnings. Services including tourism, construction, and commercial activities constitute the remainder of the GDP. Plantations engage a large proportion of the population in producing the islands' major cash crops for export: vanilla, cloves, perfume essences, and copra. The Comoros is the world's leading producer of essence of ylang-ylang, used in manufacturing perfume. It also is the world's second-largest producer of vanilla, after Madagascar. Principal food crops are coconuts, bananas, and cassava. Foodstuffs constitute 32% of total imports.

=== Agriculture and livestock ===
Agriculture supported about 80 percent of the population and supplied about 95 percent of exports in the early 1990s. Two agricultural zones are generally defined: the coastal area, which ranges in elevation from sea level to 400 meters and which supports cash crops such as vanilla, ylang-ylang, and cloves; and the highlands, which support cultivation of crops for domestic consumption, such as cassava, bananas, rain rice, and sweet potatoes. As the population increased, food grown for domestic use met fewer and fewer of Comorans' needs. Data collected by the World Bank showed that food production per capita fell about 12 percent from 1980 to 1987. The republic imported virtually all its meat and vegetables; rice imports alone often accounted for up to 30 percent of the value of all imports.

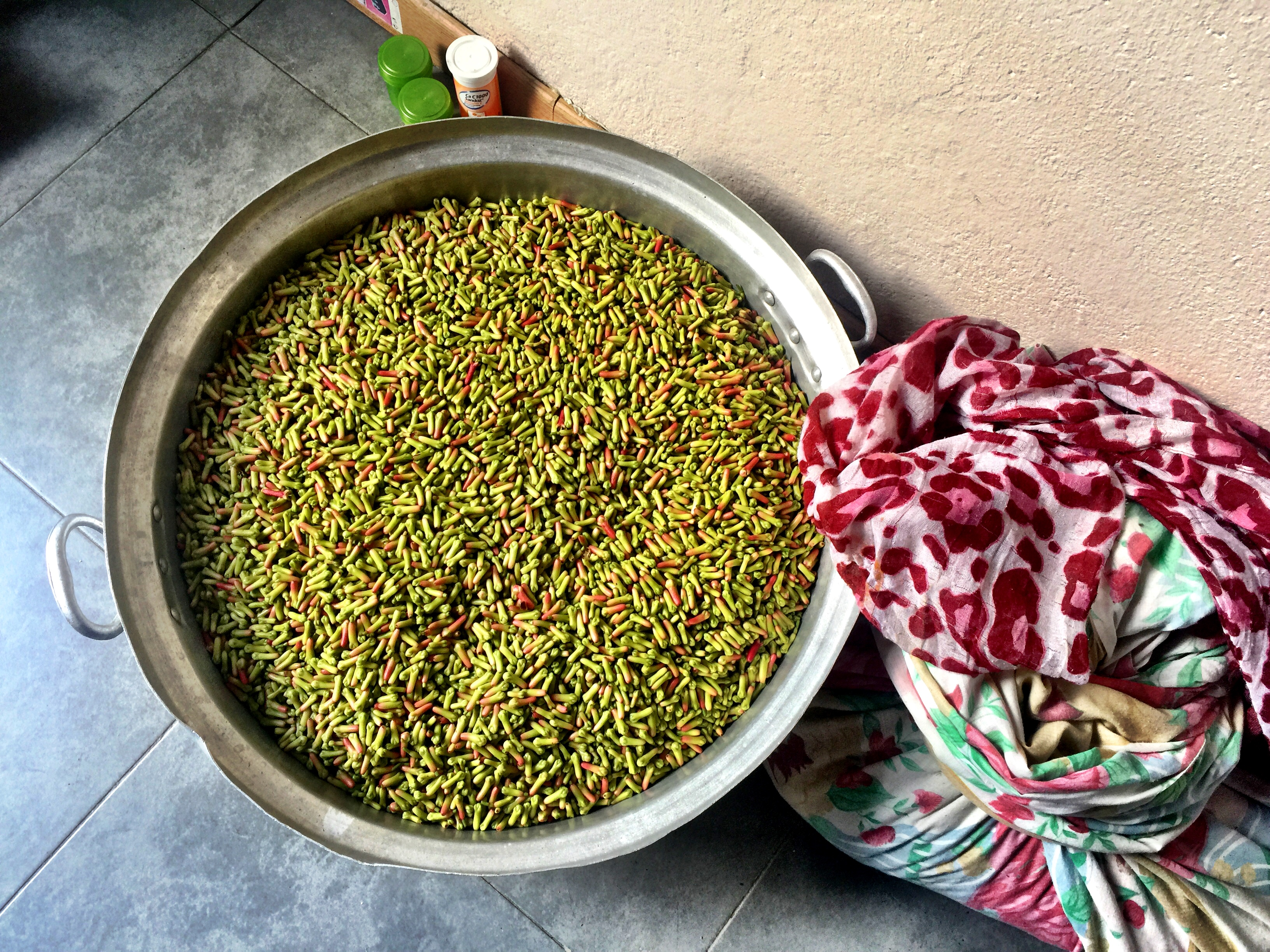
Cloves ready to be dried

The Comoros is the world's principal producer of ylang-ylang essence, an essence derived from the flowers of a tree originally brought from Indonesia that is used in manufacturing perfumes and soaps. Ylang-ylang essence is a major component of Chanel No. 5, the popular scent for women. The republic is the world's second largest producer of vanilla, after Madagascar. Cloves are also an important cash crop. A total of 237 tons of vanilla was exported in 1991, at a price of about CF19 per kilogram. A total of 2,750 tons of cloves was exported in 1991, at a price of CF397 per kilogram. That year forty-three tons of ylang-ylang essence were exported at a price of about CF23,000 per kilogram. The production of all three commodities fluctuates wildly, mainly in response to changes in global demand and natural disasters such as cyclones. Profits—and therefore, government receipts—likewise skyrocket and plummet, wreaking havoc with government efforts to predict revenues and plan expenditures. Stabex (Stabilization of Export Earnings—see Glossary), a system of the EC, provides aid to the Comoros and other developing countries to mitigate the effects of fluctuations in the prices of export commodities.

Long-term prospects for the growth and stabilization of the markets for vanilla and ylang-ylang did not appear strong in the early 1990s. Vanilla faced increased competition from synthetic flavorings, and the preferences of perfume users were moving away from the sweet fragrance provided by ylang-ylang essence. Copra, the dried coconut meat that yields coconut oil, once an important Comoran export, had ceased to be a significant factor in the economy by the late 1980s, when the world's tastes shifted from high-fat coconut oil toward "leaner" substances such as palm oil. Although clove production and revenues also experienced swings, in the early 1990s cloves did not appear to face the same sorts of challenges confronting vanilla and ylang-ylang. Most Comoran vanilla is grown on Njazidja; Nzwani is the source of most ylangylang.

Numerous international programs have attempted to reduce the country's dependence on food imports, particularly of rice, a major drain on export earnings. Organizations initiating these rural development programs have included the EDF, the IFAD, the World Food Program, the Arab Bank for Economic Development in Africa, the UN Food and Agriculture Organization, and the governments of France and the United States. Despite these international efforts, which numbered as many as seventeen in 1984, food production per capita actually declined in the Comoros during the 1980s. The major clove and vanilla growers, whose plantations occupy the islands' fertile coastal lands, generally resisted these restructuring efforts, as did rice-importing firms, including the country's largest, Établissements Abdallah et Fils.

Crowded onto the mountain slopes by the cash crop plantations, food-crop farmers have caused deforestation and the erosion of the highlands' thin, fragile soil. In response, aid providers have dedicated an increasing amount of agricultural assistance to reforestation, soil restoration, and environmentally sensitive means of cultivation. For example, all United States agricultural aid in 1991 (US$700,000) was directed to such projects, as was a US$4 million loan from the IFAD to help initiate a small producers' support program on Nzwani.

The livestock sector is small—some 47,000 cattle, 120,000 goats, 13,000 sheep, and 4,000 asses in 1990. The Comoros continues to import most domestically consumed meat.

=== Fishing ===
Since the latter part of the 1980s, the Comoros has made headway in developing fisheries as a source of export earnings. In 1988 the government concluded a three-year agreement with the EC by which forty French and Spanish vessels would be permitted to fish in Comoran waters, primarily for tuna. In return, the Comoros would receive ECU300,000, and ECU50,000 would be invested in fisheries research. In addition, fishing vessel operators would pay ECU20 per ton of tuna netted. Although the deep waters outside the islands' reefs do not abound in fish, it has been estimated that up to 30,000 tons of fish could be taken per year from Comoran waters (which extend 320 kilometers offshore). The total catch in 1990 was 5,500 tons. Japan has also provided aid to the fishing industry. Fisheries development is overseen by a state agency, the Development Company for Small-Scale Fisheries of the Comoros (Société de Développement de la Pêche Artisanale des Comores).

=== Forestry ===
Forested areas amounted to about 8,000 hectares (20,000 acres) in 2000. Numerous fruit trees and tropical hardwoods are found. Some timber is produced, notably on the island of Grande Comore, which has about half the remaining forest. Roundwood production in 2003 amounted to 9,000 cu m (300,000 cu ft).

== Industry ==
Location of the Comoros Islands.

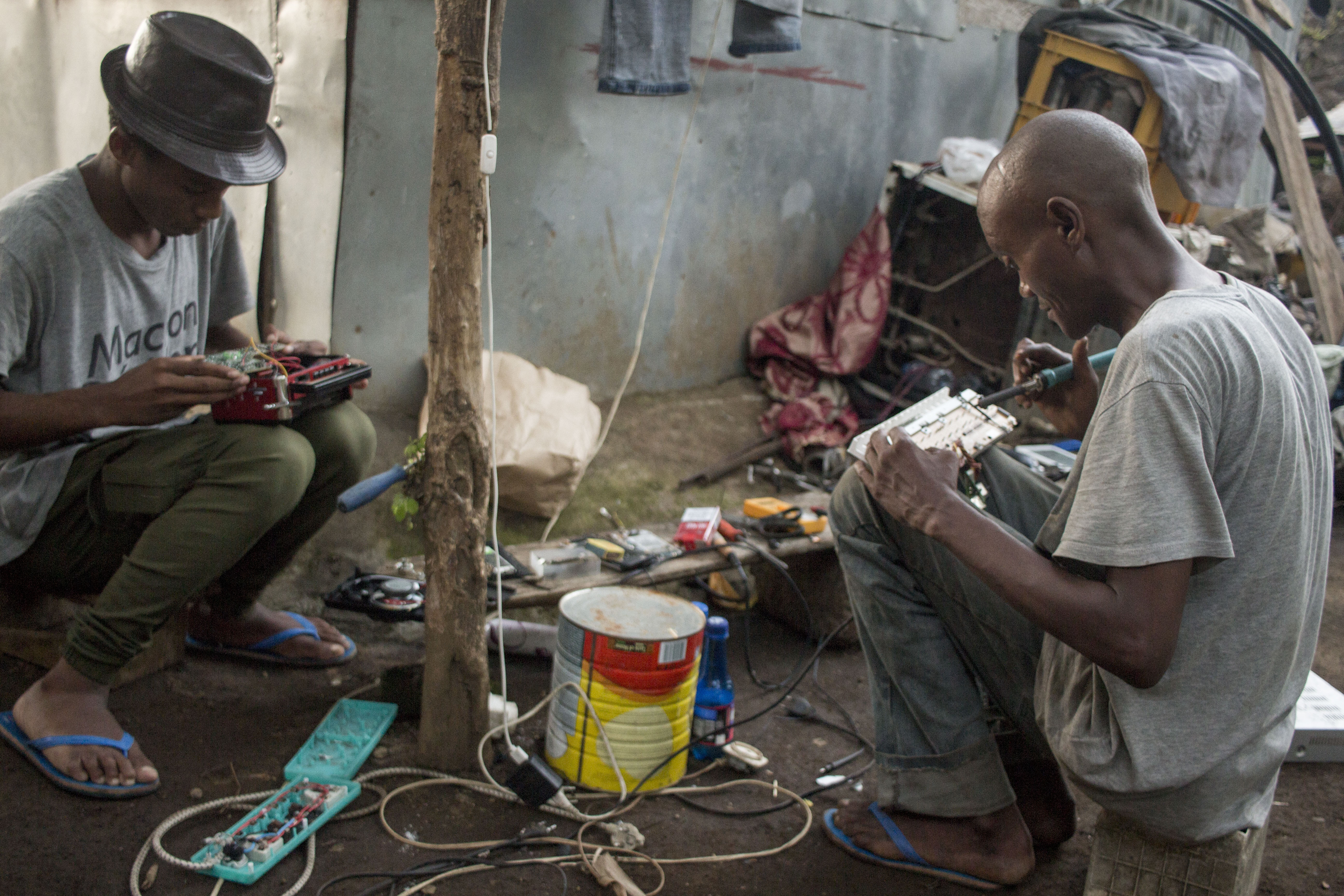
Informal sector: two men repairing electronical device.

Industrial activities are responsible for only a tiny portion of Comoran economic activity—about 5 percent of GDP in 1994. Principal industries are those that involve processing cash crops for export: preparing vanilla and distilling ylang-ylang into perfume essence. These activities were once controlled almost entirely by French companies, but as they closed unprofitable plantations, individual farmers set up many small, inefficient distilleries.

Comorans also produce handicrafts for export.

Other industries are small and geared to internal markets: sawmills, printing, carpentry, and the production of shoes, plastics, yogurt, handicrafts (such as the jewelry exchanged as part of the grand marriage), and small fishing boats.

Several factors provide major obstacles to the growth of industry: the islands' geographically isolated position, their distance from each other, a scarcity of raw materials and skilled labor, and the high cost of electricity (energy is produced by hydropower, imported petroleum, and wood products) and transportation. Value added in industry slowly declined throughout the 1980s.

== Tourism ==
Perhaps the primary outcome of South African penetration of the Comoran economy during Ahmed Abdallah's regime was the development of tourism. Although South African investors built or renovated several hotels during the 1980s (with assistance from the South African and Comoran governments), only one resort, the 182-room Galawa Beach on Njazidja, was operating by late 1992. About 100 other hotel rooms were available on the islands. Political instability, a declining South African interest in the islands as the apartheid regime was disassembled and other tropical tourism venues became more welcoming, and the need to import most construction materials and consumable supplies inhibited the growth of tourism, despite the islands' physical beauty. Nonetheless, in large part thanks to Galawa Beach, which had been closed during 1990, tourism increased from 7,627 visitors in 1990 to 16,942 in 1991. Most of these tourists were Europeans, primarily French (see Historical Setting, this ch.).

== Infrastructure ==
The country lacks the infrastructure necessary for development. Some villages are not linked to the main road system or at best are connected by tracks usable only by four-wheel-drive vehicles. The islands' ports are rudimentary, although a deepwater facility was recently completed on Anjouan. Only small vessels can approach the existing quays in Moroni on Grande Comore, despite recent improvements. Long-distance, ocean-going ships must lie offshore and be unloaded by smaller boats; during the cyclone season, this procedure is dangerous, and ships are reluctant to call at the island. Most freight is sent first to Mombasa or Réunion and transshipped from there.

The banking system consists of the Central Bank of the Comoros (Banque Centrale des Comores) established in 1981 that had three offices (Moroni (Grande-Comore), Mutsamudu (Anjouan) and Fomboni (Mohéli)); the Banque pour l'Industrie et le Commerce des Comores, a commercial bank established in 1990 that had six branches in 1993 and was a subsidiary of the Banque Nationale de Paris; the Development Bank of the Comoros (Banque de Développement des Comores), established in 1982, which provided support for small and midsize development projects, the Federal Bank of Commerce (Banque Fédérale de Commerce) and the Exim Bank Comores Ltd. Most of the shares in the Development Bank of the Comoros were held by the Comoran government and the central bank; the rest were held by the European Investment Bank and the Caisse Centrale de Coopération Économique, a development agency of the French government. All of these banks had headquarters in Moroni.

== External trade ==
Exports of Comoros by product category (2019) Chemical products Transportation Machines Mineral products Plastics and rubbers Metals Foodstuffs Precious metals Textiles Instruments Animal products Vegetable products Paper goods Footwear and headwear Miscellaneous Stone and glass Wood products Animal and vegetable bi-products Animal hides Arts and antiques Weapons

France, the Comoros' major trading partner, finances small projects only. The United States receives a growing percentage of the Comoros' exports but supplies only a negligible fraction of its imports (less than 1%).

The overall effect of the republic's dependence on aid has been perennial trade deficits accompanied by chronic budget deficits. In 1992 total exports had a value of US$21 million, and total imports were valued at US$50 million. In 1991 receipts totaled about US$34.7 million (CF9.7 trillion; CF—Comoran franc; for value of the Comoran franc—see Glossary) whereas expenditures totaled about US$93.8 million (CF26.2 trillion). The shortfall, which equaled about 170 percent of receipts, was financed by international grants and loans, by draws upon existing lines of credit, and by debt rescheduling.

In 1991 France received 55 percent of Comoran exports, followed by the United States (19 percent) and Germany (16 percent). The main export products were vanilla, ylang-ylang, and cloves. The republic's primary suppliers were France (56 percent of imports), the Belgium-Luxembourg economic union (11 percent), and Japan (5 percent). Imports consisted of basic foodstuffs (rice and meat), petroleum, and construction materials.

Comoros has an international airport (Prince Said Ibrahim International Airport) at Hahaya on Grande Comore. It is a member of the franc zone with an exchange rate of 491.9677 Comorian francs (KMF) = 1 [Euro].

== See also ==
- Economy of East Africa
- List of companies based in the Comoros
- United Nations Economic Commission for Africa
