= Banque de Madagascar =

Former Paris-based colonial bank

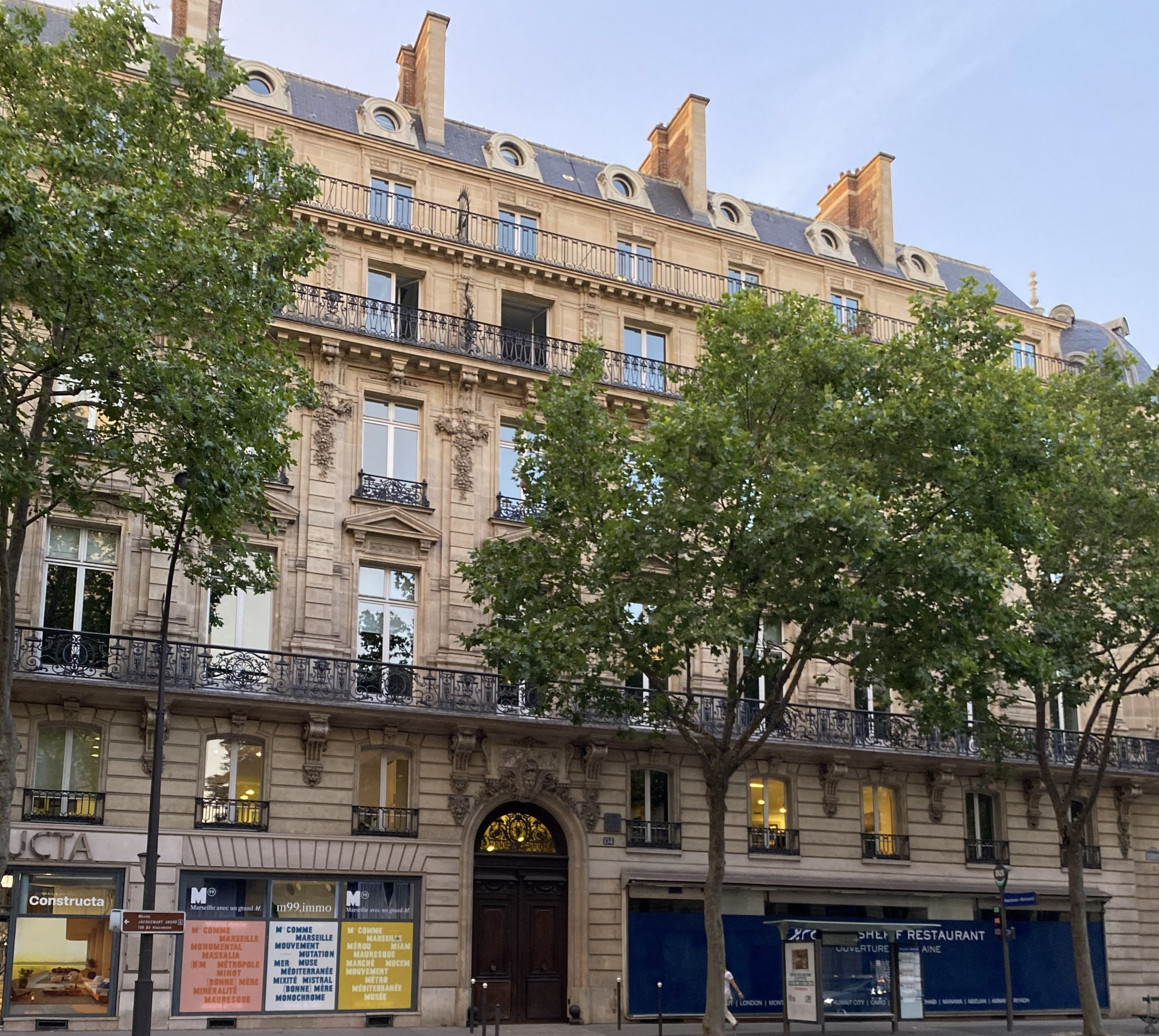
Building at 134, boulevard Haussmann in Paris, the first seat of Banque de Madagascar

The Banque de Madagascar, from 1946 the Banque de Madagascar et des Comores, was a bank established by the French government in 1925 to issue currency and provide credit in French Madagascar. As such, it fulfilled many of the functions of a central bank for the colony.

== Background ==
Following the establishment of the Malagasy Protectorate, France took over direct administration of Madagascar as a colony in 1897. The Comptoir national d'escompte de Paris established a presence on the island in the late 19th century, and had advocated the creation of a local issuance bank as early as 1895. Until World War I, its only form of currency was coins of French francs. Franc banknotes were introduced during the war in substitution to the coin money, but did not satisfy the needs of Madagascar's colonial economy that would be better served by local money issuance. Parliamentary debates lingered in France for several years, as different models were considered including direct issuance by the French state, or the granting of an issuance privilege to a private-sector bank as had been done elsewhere with the Banque de l'Indochine in 1875 and the Banque de l'Afrique Occidentale in 1901.

== Banque de Madagascar ==
Legislation was eventually adopted on 22 December 1925 that created the Banque de Madagascar as a specialized issuance bank that would in practice be operated by the Banque de Paris et des Pays-Bas (BPPB), with which the French Finance Ministry and the colonial government of Madagascar had respectively signed agreements to that effect on 1 July 1925. The bank's initial capital was held by the government of French Madagascar (20 percent), the BPPB (15 percent), the Comptoir national d'escompte de Paris (10 percent), various colonial economic interests in Madagascar (35 percent), and the inhabitants of Madagascar (20 percent) through a public subscription that was successfully conducted in March 1926. The French state had the power to name the bank's chairman and three other members of its board of directors. The governance adopted for the Banque de Madagascar represented a more hands-on approach of the French government than in previous comparable episodes. It served as a model for subsequent revisions of the issuance privilege, first of the Bank of West Africa and later of the Banque de l'Indochine.

The bank issued banknotes in Malagasy franc (French: franc malgache), which was pegged at par to the French franc. Initially, French coins continued to circulate (Malagasy franc coins were first produced in 1943). The bank had to pay a levy to the French government for the issuance monopoly, which in 1927 was nearly 2 million francs. The government also held special shares that gave it a privileged claim over the bank's income. From May to December 1926, the bank opened seven branches, first in Tananarive (now Antananarivo) and then in Tamatave (now Toamasina), Diégo-Suarez (now Antsiranana), Majunga (now Mahajanga), Nossi-Bé (now Nosy Be), Fianarantsoa, and Mananjary. Another branch opened in 1927 in Tuléar (now Toliara).

The bank's shares were listed on the Paris Bourse on 27 September 1928. In 1928, another branch opened in Manakara, and yet another one in Fort-Dauphin on 15 December 1929.

In Paris, the bank's headquarters was initially established at 134 Boulevard Haussmann. On 1 April 1929 it relocated to a former mansion at 88 rue de Courcelles. That building was demolished in the second half of the 20th century. The bank also had an office in Marseille, at 26 avenue du Prado.

== Banque de Madagascar et des Comores ==
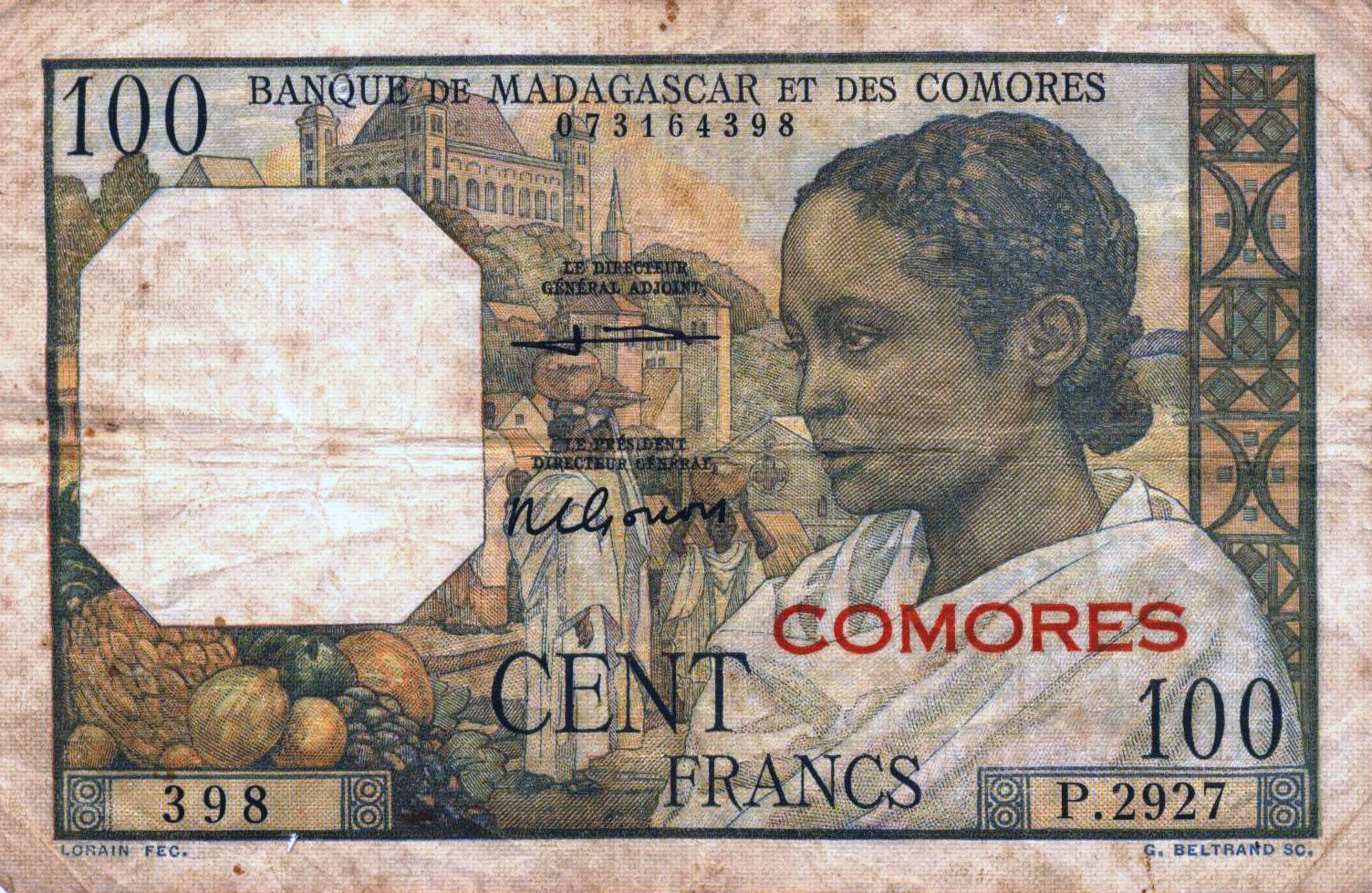
Note of 100 francs - Comores, 1962

When the Comoro Islands became a separate French territory in 1946, the name of the issuing bank was changed to Banque de Madagascar et des Comores. A branch office opened in Comoros in 1953. While the banknotes were changed to reflect the new status of Comoros, the coins were not changed and bore only the name Madagascar.

The Madagascar-Comores CFA franc (XMCF) replaced the franc of Madagascar on December 26, 1945, with the creation of the other CFA francs. The CFA franc was worth 1.7 French francs until 1948 when a devaluation of the French currency increased the rate to 1 CFA franc = 2 French francs. When the new French franc was introduced in 1960, the rate became 1 CFA franc = 0.02 French francs.

In 1950, the French government took over majority ownership of the Banque de Madagascar et des Comores. On 1 January 1960, the French franc was revalued, with 100 old francs becoming 1 new franc. (Décret n°59-1450 du 22 décembre 1959) The new exchange rate was 1 Madagascar-Comores CFA franc = 0.02 French francs (50 Madagascar-Comores CFA francs = 1 French franc).

On 26 June 1960, Madagascar gained independence from France, and the Institut d'Émission Malgache ("Madagascan Institute of [money] Issuance"), headquartered in Antananarivo, was created to issue currency only for Madagascar. Madagascar left the CFA zone effective 1 July 1973. In 1974, the Institut d'Émission Malgache became the Central Bank of Madagascar.

In the Comoros, the bank lost its issuance monopoly in 1963. The Institut d'Émission des Comores was established in 1974, and became the Central Bank of the Comoros in 1981.

In 1977, the Banque de Madagascar et des Comores merged with the Banque immobilière de Crédit-Soficam to form the Compagnie générale de banque Soficam.

== Leadership ==
The successive individuals were the bank's chairman and chief executive (Président-Directeur Général):

- Henri Saurin (January 1926-November 1936)
- Pierre Chaudun (November 1936 – 1949 or 1950)
- Maurice Gognon (1949 or 1950-?)

== See also ==
- Banque de l'Indochine
- Banque de l'Afrique Occidentale
