= Central Bank of Madagascar =

State-owned bank in Madagascar

Central Bank of Madagascar Banky Foiben'i Madagasikara

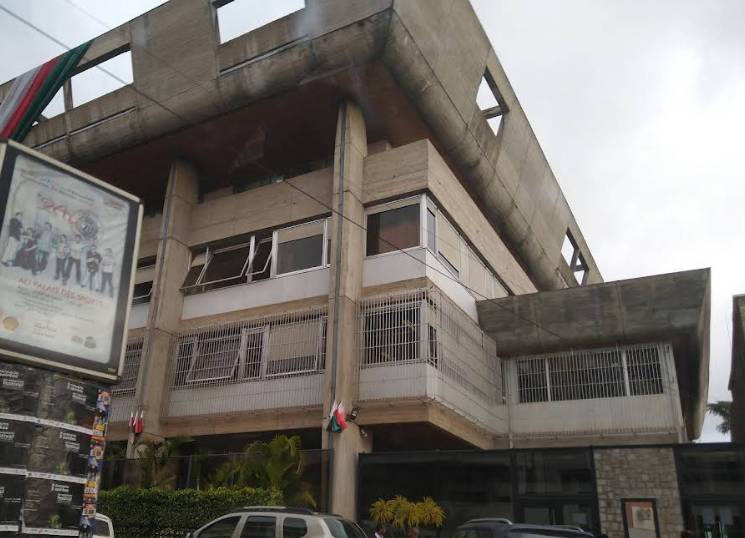
- Established: 1974
- Ownership: 100% state ownership
- Governor: Aivo Andrianarivelo
- Central bank of: Madagascar
- Currency: Malagasy ariary MGA (ISO 4217)
- Reserves: 750 million USD
- Website: www.banky-foibe.mg

The Central Bank of Madagascar (Malagasy: Banky Foiben'i Madagasikara, BFM) is the central bank of Madagascar.

The bank's mission is to, in collaboration with the general government, and in observation of the laws of finance, to maintain the general political economy of Madagascar; and to maintain the national monetary reserves. The offices of the bank are located in Antananarivo.

The Central Bank of Madagascar is active in developing financial inclusion policy and is a member of the Alliance for Financial Inclusion.

== History ==
The Banque Centrale de Madagascar has origins in the Banque de Madagascar, which issued the Madagascar-Comores CFA franc, beginning in 1925, as Madagascar's currency. In 1945, after the creation of Territory of Comoros, the Banque de Madagascar et des Comores was formed; concurrent with the creation of many other African franc currencies.

After Madagascar's independence from France in 1960, Madagascar began issuing the Malagasy franc (MGF) again, as the currencies of the Comoros and Madagascar were separated.

In 1973, Madagascar left the CFA franc zone and the Malagasy franc was declared inconvertible by the authorities of the Confederation Franc Africaine. Madagascar's coins and banknotes were then issued by Madagascar's Institut d'Émission Malgache until 1974 when the Banque Centrale de Madagascar was formed. Since 2005, the Malagasy ariary (MGA), issued by the Banque Centrale de Madagascar, has been the country's currency.

== Operations ==
The bank maintains departments of microfinance and of economic research.

The BCM reports to the government agency: Commission de Supervision Bancaire et Financière.

The bank maintains 2 branches and 8 agency offices:

Branches:

- Toamasina TMS
- Fianarantsoa FIA

Agency Offices:

- Antsiranana ATS
- Nosy Be NSB
- Mahajanga MGA
- Sambava SBV
- Manakara MKR
- Tolagnaro FTD
- Morondava MDV
- Toliary TUL

== List of governors ==
- 1973–1983: Leon Maxime Rajaobelina
- 1984–1988: Richard Randriamaholy
- 1988–1993: Blandin Razafimanjato
- 1993–1994: Raoul Joëlson Ravelomanana
- 1996–2007: Gaston Edouard Ravelojaona
- 2007–2012: Frédéric Rasamoely
- 2012–2013: Guy Ratovondrahona (acting)
- 2013–2014: Vonimanitra Razafimbelo (acting)
- 2014–2019: Alain Rasolofondraibe
- 2019–2023: Henri Rabarijohn
- since January 2023: Aivo Andrianarivelo

== See also ==
- Economy of Madagascar
- List of central banks
- Malagasy ariary, the unit of currency from 2005
- Malagasy franc former currency
- List of central banks of Africa
