= Malagasy franc =

Former currency of Madagascar

franc malgache (French)
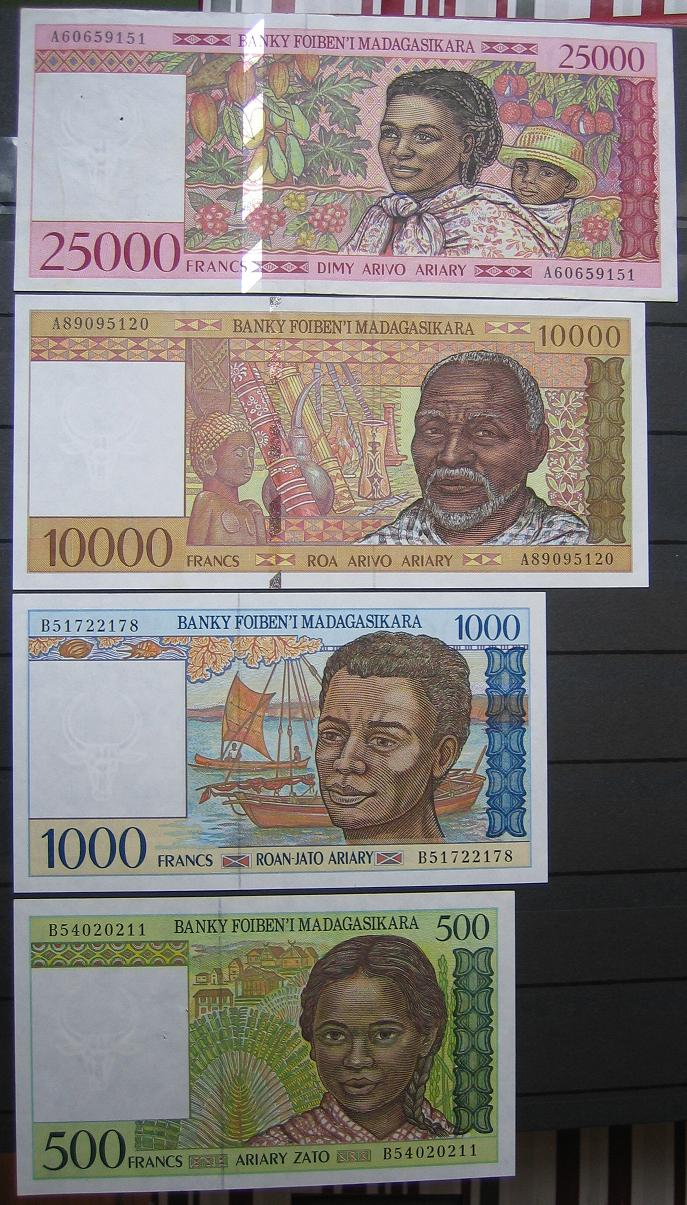
- The 1998 series of franc banknotes

ISO 4217
- Code: MGF

Units of account
- Symbol: MF
- Superunit
- 5: ariary
- Subunit
- 1/100: centime

Denominations
- Banknotes: 500, 1,000, 2,500, 5,000, 10,000, 25,000 francs
- Coins: 1, 2, 5, 10, 20 francs 5, 10, 20, 50 ariary

Demographics
- Date of introduction: 1 July 1963
- Replaced: CFA franc
- Date of withdrawal: 31 December 2004
- Replaced by: Malagasy ariary
- User(s): Madagascar

Issuance
- Central bank: Central Bank of Madagascar
- Website: www.banque-centrale.mg
- This infobox shows the latest status before this currency was rendered obsolete.

The franc (ISO 4217 code MGF) was the currency of Madagascar until 1 January 2005. It was subdivided into 100 centimes. In Malagasy the corresponding term for the franc is iraimbilanja, and five Malagasy francs is called ariary.

== History ==
The first francs to circulate in Madagascar were French francs. These were supplemented during the First World War by emergency issues, including issues of postage stamps fixed to pieces of card in denominations of 0.05 up to 2 francs.

The Banque de Madagascar was created on 1 July 1925 by the French government. The currency was issued by the government-owned Banque de Madagascar and was pegged at par to the French franc. Only banknotes were issued with French coins continuing to circulate. When the Comoro Islands became a separate French territory, the name of the issuing bank was changed to Banque de Madagascar et des Comores. The Madagascar-Comores CFA franc (XMCF) replaced the franc of Madagascar on 26 December 1945, with the creation of the other CFA francs. The CFA franc was worth 1.7 French francs until 1948 when a devaluation of the French currency increased the rate to 1 CFA franc = 2 French francs. When the new French franc was introduced in 1960, the rate became 1 CFA franc = 0.02 French francs.

After independence from France, the privilege to issue banknotes was transferred to the Institut d'Émission Malgache on 31 December 1961. The CFA franc was replaced by the Malagasy franc on 1 July 1963. It was pegged to the French franc with the same value as the CFA franc (1 FRF = 50 MGF), guaranteed by the French treasury. Denominations were given both in francs and ariary, with 5 francs = 1 ariary. Madagascar left the CFA franc zone in 1972 and the Malagasy franc was declared inconvertible. Banknotes were issued by the Institut d'Émission Malgache until 1974 when the Banque Centrale de Madagascar (Central Bank of Madagascar) took over that function.

The peg to the French franc was kept until 1982 when a series of devaluations began. Finally, the franc was floated freely in May 1994. On 1 June 1995 the exchange rate had dropped to 1 FRF = 777 MGF. On 1 January 2005 it was replaced by the ariary at a rate of 5 francs to the ariary. By then, the exchange rate was 1 EUR = 11,531 MGF (with one euro = 6.55957 FRF).

== Coins ==
5 Malagasy franc
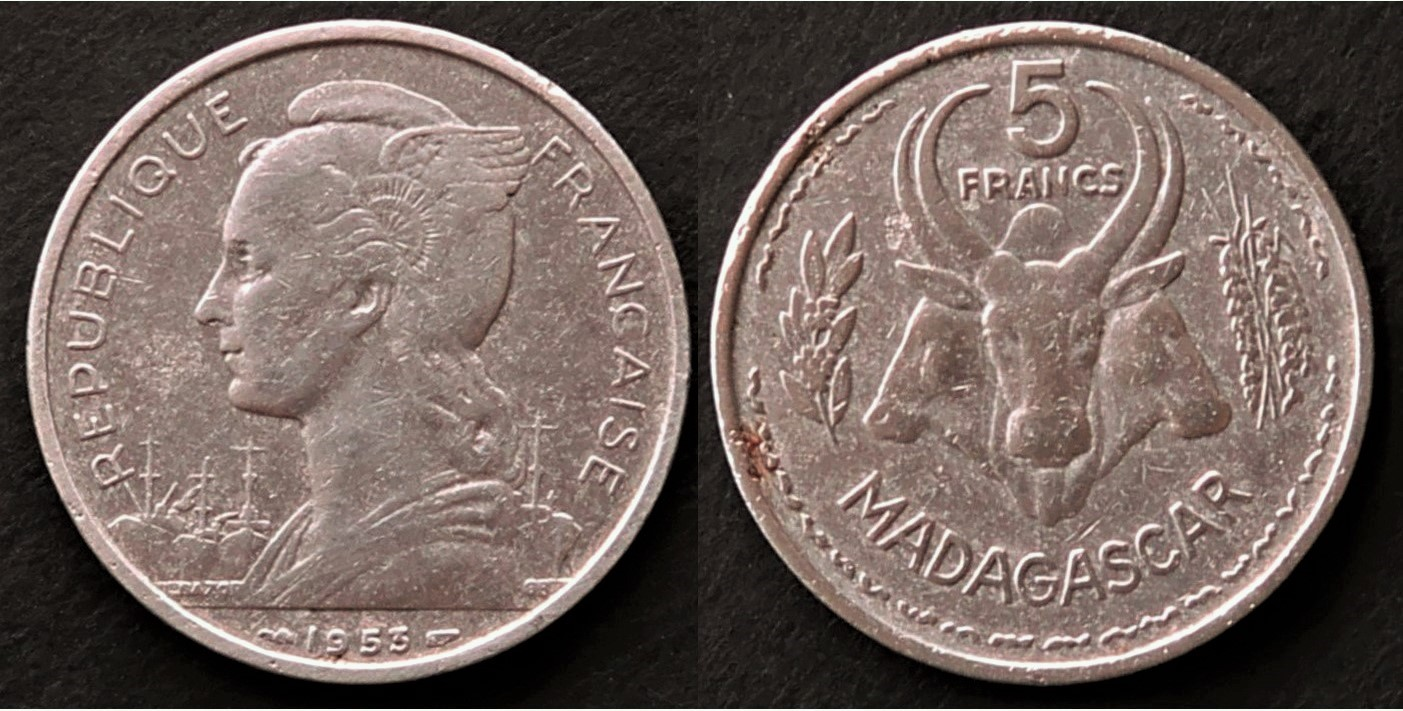
First side of the image: Obverse: Portrait of Marianne with cargo ships in the background. Year at the bottom and lettering "REPUBLIQUE FRANÇAISE" on the periphery.
Second side of the image: Reverse: Denomination on top and country name at the bottom. In the centre, three Zebu conjoined heads.
Total 30,012,000 coins minted in 1953.

1 franc 1948

The first Malagasy coins were issued in 1943 by the Free French. These were bronze 50 centime and 1 franc coins bearing the Cross of Lorraine symbol. In 1948, aluminum 1 and 2 franc coins were introduced, followed by aluminum 5 francs and aluminum bronze 10 and 20 francs in 1953.

From 1965, coins were issued denominated in both francs and ariary.

== Banknotes ==
5 francs ca. 1937

Following emergency issues between 1914 and 1917 related to the availability of 5, 10 and 20 franc notes, distinct Malagasy notes were introduced in 1925 in denominations of 5, 10, 20, 50, 100 and 1000 francs. The lower three denominations were replaced by coins in the 1940s and 50s, with 5000 franc notes introduced in 1950.

From 1961, banknotes were issued denominated in both francs and ariary. Following France’s switch to the euro, Madagascar decided it was time to phase out the franc as well. While still denominated in both ariary and francs, on notes issued since 31 July 2003, the former is emphasized with larger fonts and predominant placement. Beginning in 2007, new notes no longer contain references to the franc as a currency and are instead denominated solely in ariary, which replaced the franc as the official currency of Madagascar on 1 January 2005, at a rate of 5 francs per ariary.
