= Malagasy ariary =

Currency of Madagascar

ariary malagasy (Malagasy); ariary malgache (French)
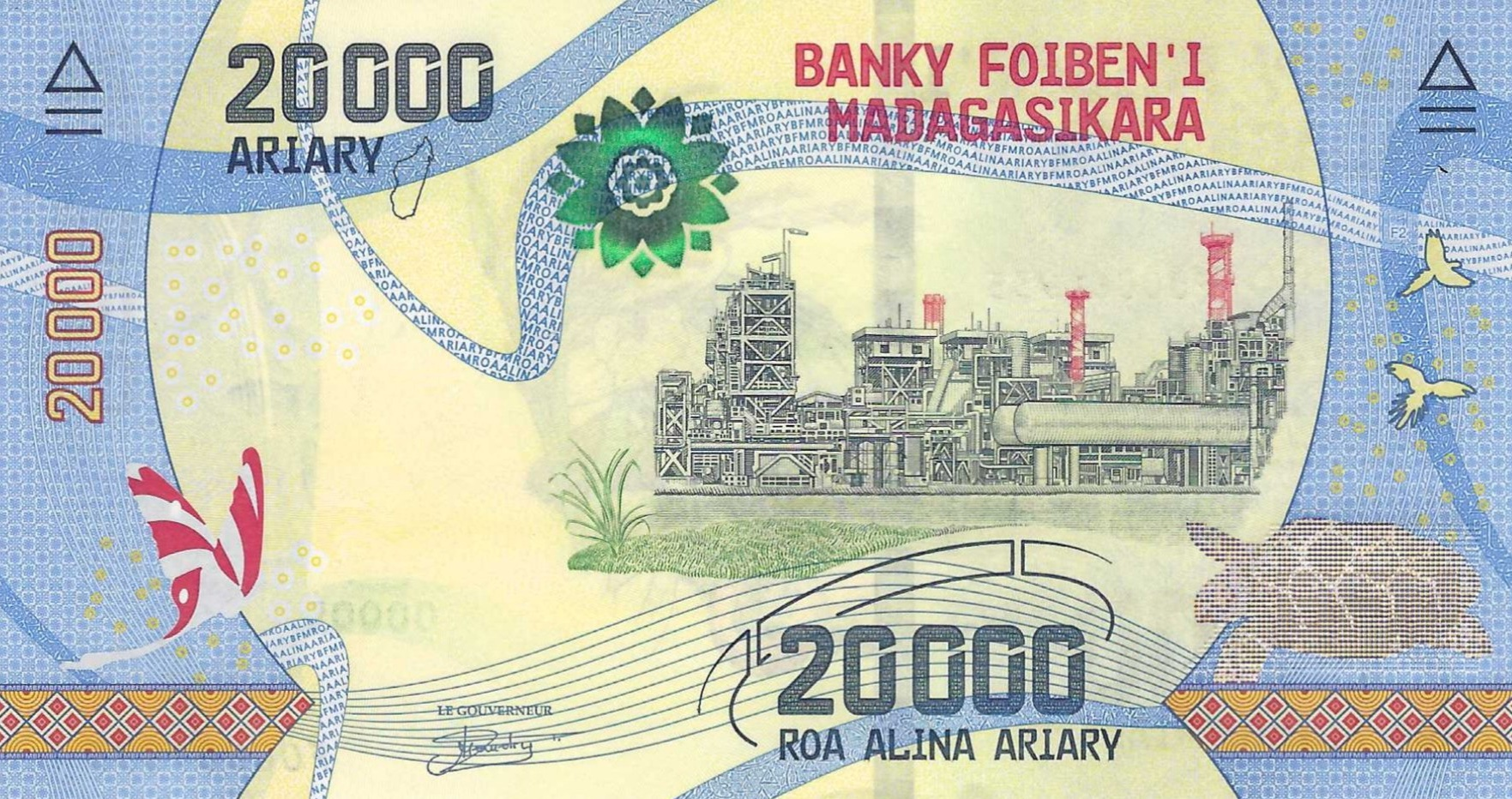
- 20000 ariary note (2025)

ISO 4217
- Code: MGA (numeric: 969)
- Subunit: 0.01

Unit
- Plural: The language(s) of this currency do(es) not have a morphological plural distinction.
- Symbol: Ar

Denominations
- Subunit
- 1/5: iraimbilanja (franc)
- Banknotes
- Freq. used: 100, 200, 500, 1000, 2000, 5000, 10,000 Ar
- Rarely used: 20,000 Ar
- Coins
- Freq. used: 10, 20, 50 Ar
- Rarely used: 1, 2 iraimbilanja; 1, 2, 4, 5 Ar

Demographics
- Replaced: Malagasy franc
- User(s): Madagascar

Issuance
- Central bank: Banky Foiben'i Madagasikara
- Website: www.banky-foibe.mg

Valuation
- Inflation: 8.8%
- Source: The World Factbook, 2013 est.

The ariary (sign: Ar; ISO 4217 code MGA) is the currency of Madagascar. It is notionally subdivided into 5 iraimbilanja and is one of only two non-decimal currencies currently circulating (the other being the Mauritanian ouguiya). The names ariary and iraimbilanja derive from the pre-colonial currency, with ariary (from the Spanish word real) being the name for a silver dollar. Iraimbilanja means "one iron weight" and was the name of an old coin worth 1/5 of an ariary. However, as of May 2023, the unit is effectively obsolete since the iraimbilanja has practically no purchasing power, and the coins have fallen into disuse.

== History ==
The ariary was introduced in 1961. It was equal to 5 Malagasy francs. Coins and banknotes were issued denominated in both francs and ariary, with the sub-unit of the ariary, the iraimbilanja, worth 1/5 of an ariary and therefore equal to the franc. The ariary replaced the franc as the official currency of Madagascar on 1 January 2005.

Coins and banknotes were denominated in both the official francs and the semi-official ariary and iraimbilanja since 1961. On early issues, the franc denomination was the most prominent. However, in 1978, coins of higher value were issued and denominated only in ariary. In 1993, new 500 ariary-2500 franc notes and 5000 ariary-25,000 franc notes were issued with more prominent ariary. The ariary denomination is displayed prominently on banknotes issued since 31 July 2003, and the franc denomination is displayed in small print. Lower denomination coins are also now issued denominated in ariary but with the main design unchanged.

== Coins ==
In 1965, 1 franc (1 iraimbilanja) and 2 francs (venty sy kirobo) coins were issued, followed by 5 francs (1 ariary) in 1966 and 10 and 20 francs (2 and 4 ariary) in 1970. The term "venty sy kirobo" derives from names used in the 19th century for 1/6 and 1/4 of a silver dollar or 5 francs piece, since 1/6+1/4=5/12 of 5 francs is approximately 2 francs.

In 1978, 10 and 20 ariary coins were issued, which did not show the denomination in francs. These were followed in 1992 by 5 and 50 ariary coins and smaller 10 and 20 ariary coins. In 2003–04, 1 and 2 ariary coins not bearing the franc denomination were also introduced.

Coins in circulation are listed below. Bold denotes the most prominent denomination, while italic denotes an equivalence not shown on the coin.

Denomination	Name	Value in MGF
1/5 ariary	Iraimbilanja	**1 franc**
2/5 ariary	Venty sy Kirobo	**2 francs**
**1 ariary**	Ariary	**5 francs**
**2 ariary**	Ariary Roa	10 francs
4 ariary	Ariary Efatra	**20 francs**
**5 ariary**	Ariary Dimy	25 francs
**10 ariary**	Ariary Folo	50 francs
**20 ariary**	Ariary Roapolo	100 francs
**50 ariary**	Ariary Dimampolo	250 francs

== Banknotes ==
In 1961, the Institut d'Émission Malgache (Malagasy Issuing Institute) introduced 50, 100, 500, 1000 and 5000 francs banknotes. These notes were overprints on earlier notes of the Bank of Madagascar and Comoros, with the denomination in ariary (10, 20, 100, 200 and 1000) included in the overprint. Regular banknotes in the same denominations were issued between 1963 and 1969. The denomination in ariary was written only in words, not numerals.

On 12 June 1973, the Banky Foiben’ny Repoblika Malagasy (Central Bank of the Malagasy Republic) was created by Ordinance No. 73-025, taking over the functions of the Institut d’Émission Malgache, including the issuance of banknotes. In 1974, new notes were issued in the same denominations used earlier.

In December 1975, a draft constitution was overwhelmingly approved in a referendum, and the Second Malagasy Republic, called the Repoblika Demokratika Malagasy (Democratic Republic of Madagascar), was proclaimed. As a result of the change in the country's name, the former Banky Foiben’ny Repoblika Malagasy was renamed Banky Foiben’i Madagasikara (Central Bank of Madagascar). This resulted in a new series of notes, which included 10,000 francs (2000 ariary) notes but did not include 50 or 100 francs.

In 1993, notes for 500 and 5000 ariary were introduced, bearing the ariary denominations in numerals and the franc denominations (2500 and 25,000) in smaller numerals. However, in 1998, new issues replaced these notes, which only gave the franc denominations in numerals.

In 2003–2004, new notes were introduced in 100, 200, 500, 1000, 2000, 5000, and 10,000 ariary denominations. These notes also bear the franc denominations in very small numerals on notes up to 1000 ariary (500, 1000, 2500, 5000).

In 2017, the Bank Foiben’i Madagasikara (Central Bank of Madagascar) introduced a new family of banknotes. Like its previous series, the new series of notes, "Madagascar and its Riches," highlights its economic activities, biodiversity, culture and tourist sites. Part of this series includes a new denomination, 20,000 ariary. The first four denominations in this series, 2,000, 5,000, 10,000 and 20,000 ariary were issued on 17 July 2017. The four other denominations, 100, 200, 500 and 1,000 ariary, were issued on 17 September 2017.

Banknotes currently in circulation are listed below.

Denomination	Year of Issue	Obverse	Reverse
20,000	2017	Ambatovy Plant (Sherritt International)	Rice field, vanilla, pepper
10,000	2017	Port d'Ehoala	Valiha and Zafimaniry products
5,000	2017	Ranomafana National Park waterfall	Humpback whale and beach
2,000	2017	Lemur (Hapalemur alaotrensis)	Nepenthes madagascariensis
1,000	2017	Kamoro Bridge	Queen of Isalo
500	2017	Ambohimanga	Tsingy
200	2017	Montagne d'Ambre National Park	Nosy Hara National Park
100	2017	Holy Name of Jesus Cathedral	Mantella baroni frog

Current MGA exchange rates
From Google Finance:	AUD CAD CHF CNY EUR GBP HKD JPY USD
From Yahoo! Finance:	AUD CAD CHF CNY EUR GBP HKD JPY USD
From XE.com:	AUD CAD CHF CNY EUR GBP HKD JPY USD
From OANDA:	AUD CAD CHF CNY EUR GBP HKD JPY USD

== See also ==
- Economy of Madagascar
