= Füssen-Plansee work camp =

Nazi work camp

Coordinates: 47.4859°N 10.8370°E

The Füssen-Plansee work camp was a work camp that was attached to the Dachau concentration camp during World War II. It was situated in the Forelle Hotel, on the banks of the Plansee, an Austrian lake near the border of Bavaria. The occupants were principally government leaders (military, politicians, bureaucrats), imprisoned in early 1943 and released in 1945.

At least two beds were placed in each room and the facility was partially heated. The personnalités-otages - hostage persons had a library that was provided by the Red Cross.

== List of detainees ==
- Louis Bailly (1886–1967), Brigadier general;
- Léopold François Roger Basteau (1895–1986), Brigadier general;
- Wilfrid Baumgartner, CEO of Crédit national (1936–1949);
- Pierre Cueff, Major general commanding the 13th division in Clermont-Ferrand, appointed in 1943 regional commissioner for the release of prisoners of war in Rennes;
- Louis Delegue (1878–1971), Brigadier general;
- Marcel Diebolt, prefect;
- Robert Durrmeyer (1877–1954), Major general;
- Marcel Ehret (1876–1968), Major general;
- Louis Escallier (1883–1965), governor of the Bank of Algeria;
- Paul Estèbe, attached to the cabinet of Marshal Pétain;
- Louis-Eugène Faucher, (1874–1964), French officer;
- Édouard Galletier, Professor at the Sorbonne;
- Jean Frenais de Coutard (1896–1981), Director of Fuels at the Department of Industry in the Laval government;
- Fernand and Georges Giraud, brothers of General Henri Giraud;
- Jean Humbert;
- Joseph Charles Robert Jeannel (1883–1954), Lieutenant general;
- André Lahillonne;
- André Larbaletrier;
- Armand Maire (1893–1991), Chief Military Engineer;
- André Marteau (1889–1994), Major general;
- Jules Meny (1890–1945), CEO of Compagnie Française des Pétroles;
- Jean Michet de la Baume (1878–1963), Brigadier general;
- Pierre Mondanel (1890–1986), Inspector General of the Judicial Police Services;
- Maurice Muselier (1907-?), son of the admiral Émile Muselier;
- René Norguet, Secretary General for Industrial Production from January 20, 1943, to February 1944 in the Pierre Laval Government;
- Maurice Parmentier (1879–1961), Brigadier general;
- Jean Pebrel, Chief of Staff at the Ministry of Finance;
- Pierre Pujol (1888–1983), Brigadier general;
- Roger de Saivre, deputy chief of the Civil Cabinet of Marshal Petain;
- Henri de Tournemire, retired squadron leader of Vichy France;
- Jean Ybarnégaray (1883–1956), member of the government of the Vichy Regime;
- Wilhem Henri Ygonin (1874–1955), Brigadier general

== See also ==
- List of subcamps of Dachau
