= Union des nationaux indépendants et républicains =

Union of Independent and Republican Nationals Union des nationaux indépendants et républicains
- Founder: Jacques Isorni
- Secretary-General: Roger de Saivre
- Founded: 1951
- Dissolved: 1950s (merged into the National Centre of Independents and Peasants)
- Succeeded by: National Centre of Independents and Peasants
- Headquarters: France
- Ideology: Conservatism; Support for Philippe Pétain's legacy; Revisionism of the Vichy Government trials
- Political position: Far-right
- International affiliation: None
- Slogan: "Voting for de Saivre is voting for Pétain"
- Seats won (1951 elections): 5

The Union des nationaux indépendants et républicains (UNIR, Union of Independent and Republican Nationals or National Unity and Independent Republicans), was a political movement launched during the 1951 French legislative election by Jacques Isorni and other nostalgic supporters of the Vichy Government.

Officially apolitical, UNIR adhered to a minimal political platform: "to obtain the revision of the trial of Marshal Pétain and his rehabilitation, as well as the moral and material reparation for all French citizens unjustly condemned by exceptional courts." Its general secretary, Roger de Saivre, had previously campaigned in the 1948 elections to the Algerian Assembly under the slogan, "Voting for de Saivre is voting for Pétain"—a campaign that secured 20% of the vote. Upon its creation, UNIR received support from the Association for the Defense of Marshal Pétain's Memory and the Union of Independent Intellectuals.

During the 1951 election, UNIR succeeded in electing several deputies, three under the UNIR label: Jacques Isorni in Paris, Roger de Saivre in Oran, and Jacques Le Roy Ladurie in Calvados. Additionally, Paul Estèbe, a former member of the Republican Party of Liberty in Gironde, ran under the broader Rally of French Republican and Independent Groups banner, along with Georges Loustaunau-Lacau who won as an independent.

Initially, Paul Reynaud opposed the integration of UNIR deputies into the parliamentary group of the National Centre of Independents and Peasants (CNIP). As a result, they first aligned themselves with the Peasant Party of Social Union before ultimately joining the CNIP parliamentary group. Shortly thereafter, UNIR merged into the CNIP political party.
