= Georges Rivollet =

French politician

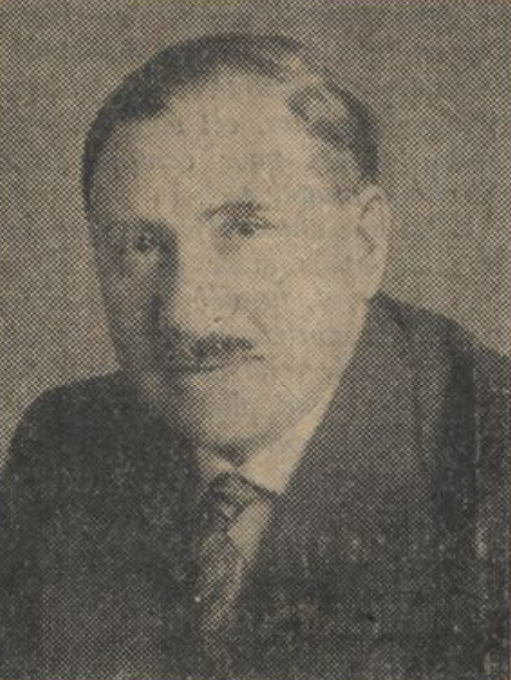
- Georges Rivollet in Le Journal (July 10, 1934)
- Born: November 3, 1888; 10th arrondissement of Paris, France
- Died: December 28, 1974 (aged 86); Meudon, Hauts-de-Seine, France
- Occupation: Politician
- Notable work: Les maréchaux d’Empire, La Corse militaire

Georges Rivollet (November 3, 1888 – December 28, 1974) was a French politician and member of the veterans' community, serving as minister of veterans affairs during the interwar period.

== Biography ==
During World War I, Rivollet served in the 47th Infantry Regiment. Enlisting at age 26 as a private, he rose to the rank of sergeant. Wounded three times, he was awarded the Médaille militaire in April 1916. A shell fragment left him a war invalid with a fractured skull. He earned three citations for bravery.

In 1918, he joined the Union nationale des réformés et mutilés (UNMR), an association for disabled veterans, becoming treasurer and later secretary-general. He was appointed to the National Office for Veterans in 1919 and remained active until August 1940.

In February 1934, Rivollet was named Minister of Veterans Affairs in the government of Gaston Doumergue. He was the first extraparliamentary figure and member of the veterans' community to hold this position.

== World War II and collaboration ==
During the German occupation of France, Rivollet presided over the UNMR and was a supporter of Franco-German collaboration. He became a member of the Rassemblement national populaire, a collaborationist party founded by Marcel Déat.

After the war, he was tried and sentenced to five years of dégradation nationale in 1950. He argued that his collaboration was to protect veterans.

== Later life ==
Rivollet was active in postwar organizations such as the Union des intellectuels indépendants and the Association pour défendre la mémoire du maréchal Pétain. He served as vice president of the latter in the 1970s. His historical works focused on the Napoleonic Wars and received recognition, including the Prix Amic of the Académie française.

== Publications ==
- Les maréchaux d’Empire (1959)
- La Corse militaire (1961)
- Charles-Antoine Louis Morand, comte d’Empire (1964)
