= François-Bernard Huyghe =

French political scientist (1951–2022)

- Born: 5 August 1951; Paris, France
- Died: 1 September 2022 (aged 71); Paris, France
- Education: Paris 2 Panthéon-Assas University; Stendhal University
- Occupations: Essayist; Political scientist
- Family: René Huyghe (father)

François-Bernard Huyghe (5 August 1951 – 1 September 2022) was a French essayist and political scientist. He served as director of research at the Institut de relations internationales et stratégiques (IRIS) and was president of the Observatoire stratégique de l'information.

== Life and career ==
The son of writer René Huyghe, François-Bernard earned a doctorate in political science from Paris 2 Panthéon-Assas University in 1983 and a Habilitation in communication studies from Stendhal University in 1996. According to Renaud Lecadre and Ghislaine Ottenheimer, he joined the Ordre Nouveau and the Groupe Union Défense. He collaborated with Défense de l'Occident during the 1970s, and became director of Jeune nation solidariste in 1977.Camus, Jean-Yves; Monzat, René (1992). Les Droites nationales et radicales en France : répertoire critique (in French). Lyon: Presses universitaires de Lyon. ISBN 2-7297-0416-7. In 1999, he vocally opposed the Kosovo War and signed the petition "Les Européens veulent la paix", initiated by the far-right pro-Serbian collective "Non à la guerre".

Huyghe was married to journalist Édith Huyghe, who died in 2014. He died from cancer on 1 September 2022, at the age of 71.

== Publications ==
- La Soft-idéologie (1987)
- La Langue de coton (1991)
- Les Experts ou l'art de se tromper de Jules Verne à Bill Gates (1996)
- Histoire des secrets : De la guerre du feu à l'Internet (2000)
- Images du monde (1999)
- L'Ennemi à l'ère numérique, Chaos, Information, Domination (2001)
- Les Coureurs d'épices (2002)
- Écran/ennemi : terrorismes et guerres de l'information (2002)
- Les Routes du tapis (2004)
- Business sous influence (2004)
- Quatrième guerre mondiale. Faire mourir et faire croire (2004)
- Comprendre le pouvoir stratégique des médias (2005)
- La Route de la soie (2006)
- Maîtres du faire croire. De la propagande à l'influence (2008)
- Contre-pouvoir. De la société d'autorité à la démocratie d'influence (2009)
- Les terroristes disent toujours ce qu'ils vont faire (2010)
- Terrorismes : violence et propagande (2011)
- Think tanks : quand les idées changent vraiment le monde (2013)
- Gagner les cyberconflits : au-delà du technique (2015)
- Désinformation : les armes du faux (2016)
- Daech : l'arme de la communication dévoilée (2017)
- Fake news : la grande peur (2018)
- Pourquoi combattre ?, directed by Pierre-Yves Rougeyron, Éditions Perspectives Libres, Paris, Janvier 2019.
- Dans la tête des Gilets jaunes (2019)
- L'Art de la guerre idéologique (2019)
- Fake news, Manip, Infox et Infodémie en 2021 (2021)
- La bataille des mots (2022)

== Awards ==
- Prix Louis-Castex (1994)
- Prix des intellectuels indépendants (1994)
