= André Liautey =

French politician (1896–1972)

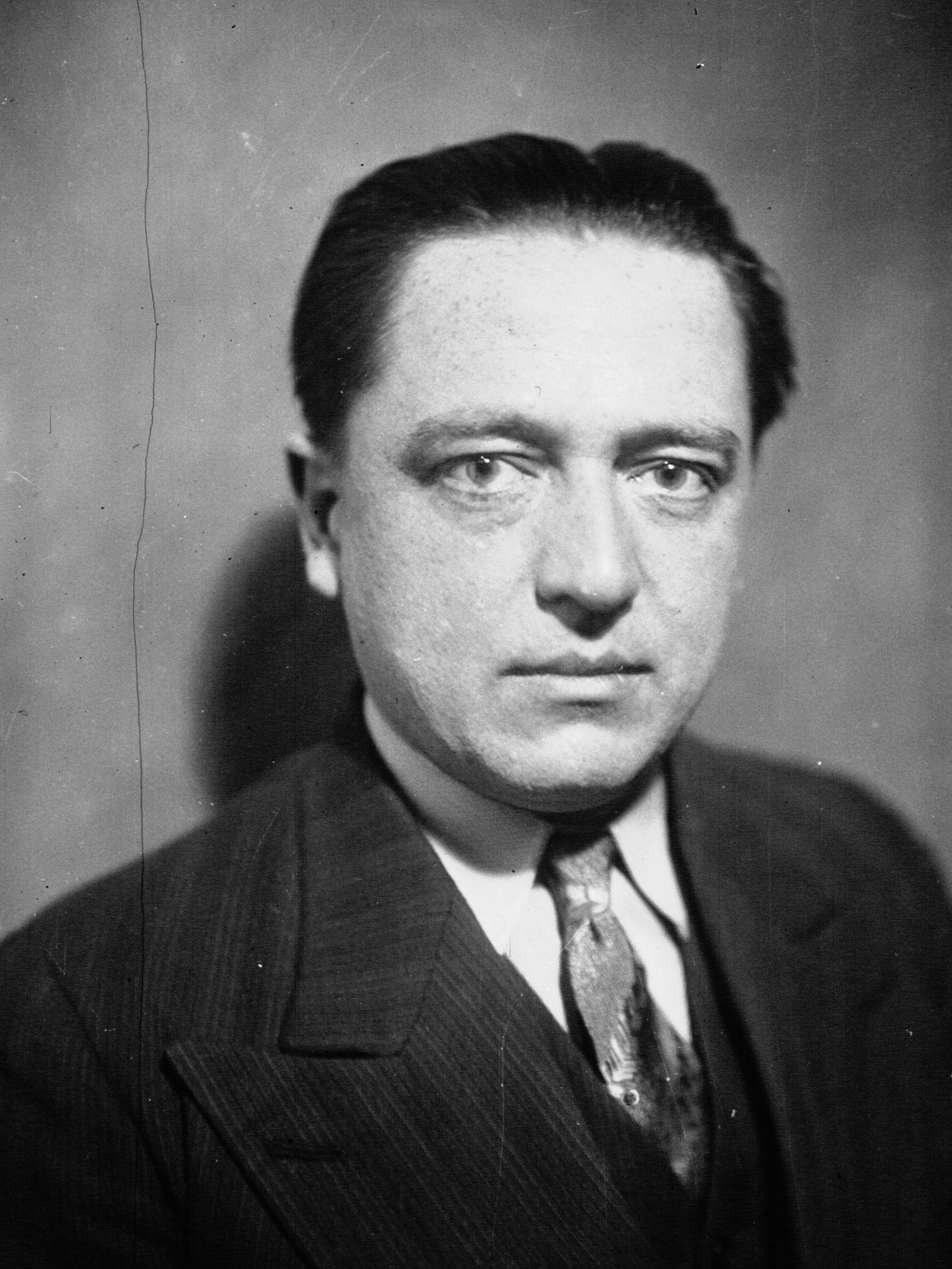
- André Liautey in 1936

Deputy for Haute-Saône
- In office 5 July 1951 – 1 December 1955
- Preceded by: None (district re-established)
- Succeeded by: None (district dissolved)

Deputy for Haute-Saône
- In office 1 June 1932 – 31 May 1942
- Preceded by: Gaston About
- Succeeded by: None (district abolished under Vichy)

Mayor of Port-sur-Saône
- In office 1945–1959
- Preceded by: Vacant (after WWII)
- Succeeded by: Pierre Richard

Undersecretary of State for Agriculture
- In office 4 June 1936 – 10 April 1938

Personal details
- Born: André François Marie Joseph Liautey; 9 March 1896 Port-sur-Saône, Haute-Saône, France
- Died: 6 October 1972 (aged 76) Port-sur-Saône, Haute-Saône, France
- Party: Radical-Socialist Party (until 1940)
- Other political affiliations: Rally of Republican and Independent French Groups (1951–1956)
- Education: École libre des sciences politiques
- Alma mater: Faculty of Law, Paris
- Profession: Lawyer, politician
- Awards: Croix de Guerre

André François Marie Joseph Liautey (9 March 1896 – 6 October 1972) was a French politician, lawyer, and decorated veteran of World War I. A member of the Radical-Socialist Party, he served as a deputy for Haute-Saône both before and after World War II. Liautey held the position of Undersecretary of State for Agriculture between 1936 and 1938 and later founded the Rally of Republican and Independent French Groups (RGRIF).

== Early life and education ==
Born in Port-sur-Saône, Haute-Saône, Liautey attended the prestigious École libre des sciences politiques after completing studies in law at the University of Paris. He graduated with a doctorate in law and a diploma in administrative and financial studies.

During the First World War, he served in the French Army, earning the Croix de Guerre for his bravery in combat.

== Political career ==
=== Third Republic ===
Liautey entered politics as a member of the Radical-Socialist Party, winning election as deputy for Haute-Saône in 1932. He was re-elected in 1936 and served until 1940. During his tenure, he was appointed Undersecretary of State for Agriculture in several governments, including those of Léon Blum and Camille Chautemps.

Liautey focused on policies to modernize French agriculture and collaborated with the forestry administration to promote tourism in France’s rural areas.

On 10 July 1940, Liautey voted to grant full powers to Philippe Pétain, a decision that later estranged him from the Radical-Socialist Party.

=== Postwar period and Fourth Republic ===
After World War II, Liautey broke with his previous party and founded the Rally of Republican and Independent French Groups (RGRIF). This centrist alliance aimed to attract moderates unwilling to join more polarized political factions. Liautey was re-elected to the National Assembly in 1951 under the RGRIF banner.

=== Other roles and contributions ===
In addition to his political career, Liautey was a prominent figure in various organizations:

- President of the Confédération générale des contribuables.
- Advocate for veterans’ rights as president of the International Conference of Associations of Mutilated and Former Combatants.
- Secretary of the National Syndicate of Bouilleurs de cru.

He also served as mayor of his hometown, Port-sur-Saône, from 1945 to 1959 and as a member of the Conseil général for Haute-Saône.

== Personal life and legacy ==
André Liautey remained dedicated to his home region throughout his life, residing in Port-sur-Saône until his death in 1972. He is remembered for his contributions to French politics during both the interwar and post-war periods, as well as his advocacy for veterans.

== Sources ==
- Olivier Verdier, Action politique et défense des intérêts catégoriels : André Liautey et le monde des groupes de pression, 1919-1960, thèse de Paris X, 2009.
- Charlotte Leblanc, « Un grand projet des années 1930 pour la valorisation du bois : une expérimentation menée en Haute-Saône », Collectif, Monumental, Le patrimoine des années 1925-1935, Paris, Éditions du patrimoine, 2018, No. 2, 128 p., p. 50-53.
