= Algerian franc =

Currency of Algeria between 1848 and 1964

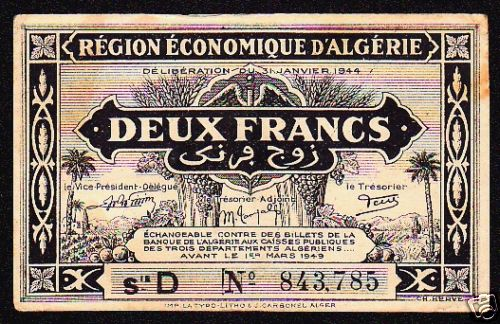
- A 2 francs notgeld printed in Algiers, January 31, 1944
- This infobox shows the latest status before this currency was rendered obsolete.

The franc was the currency of Algeria between 1848 and 1964. It was subdivided into 100 centimes.

== History ==
The franc replaced the budju when France conquer the country. It was equivalent to the French franc and was revalued in 1960 at a rate of 100 old francs = 1 new franc to maintain the equivalence. Thus, 1 old franc = 1 new centime, and prices popularly quoted in centimes are equivalent to old francs. The new franc was replaced at par by the dinar in 1964 following Algerian independence in 1962.

== Coins ==
Except for 20, 50 and 100 franc coins issued between 1949 and 1956, Algeria used the same coins as metropolitan France.

== Banknotes ==
The Banque de l'Algérie introduced its first notes in 1861. Denominations of 5, 10, 50, 100, 500 and 1,000 francs were introduced by 1873 although the 10-franc note was issued only in 1871. In 1944, notes were issued in the name of the Région économique d'Algérie in denominations of 50 centimes and 1 and 2 francs. The Bank of Algeria introduced notes worth 10,000 francs and 5,000 francs in 1945 and 1946, respectively.

In 1949, the Banque de l'Algérie et de la Tunisie commenced banknote issue, with denominations of 500, 1,000, 5,000 and 10,000 francs. The notes were overprinted with denominations of 5, 10, 50 and 100 new francs in 1960. The Bank of Algeria resumed note production with the introduction of the new franc and produced a final series of notes for 5, 10, 50 and 100 new francs until 1961.

== Gallery ==
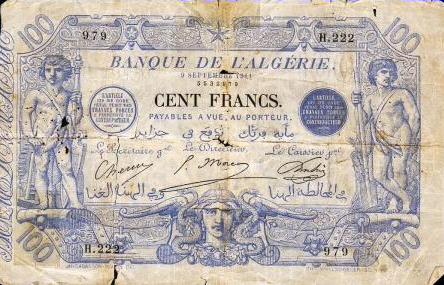
100 centimes (1911)

100 centimes (1911)

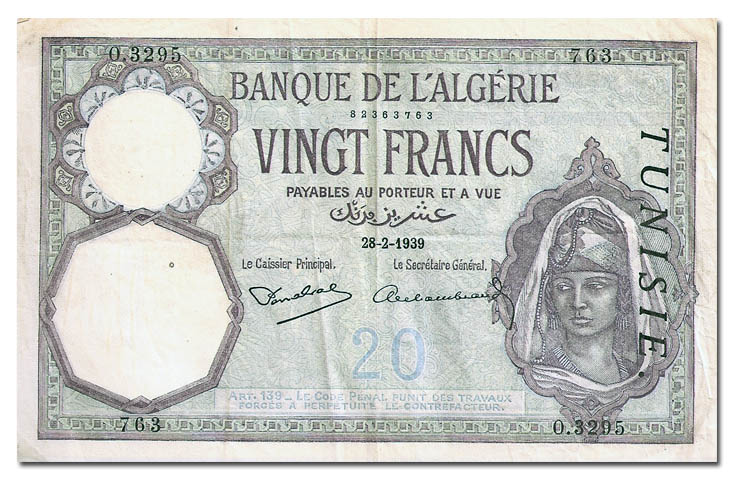
20 francs (1939)

20 francs (1939)

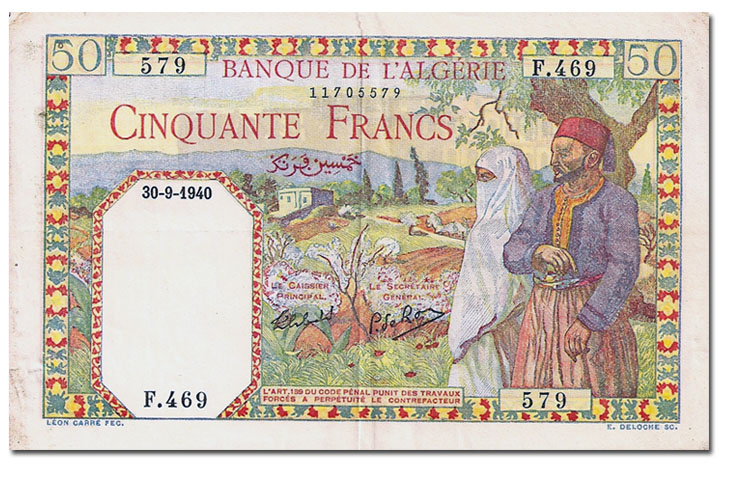
50 francs (1940)

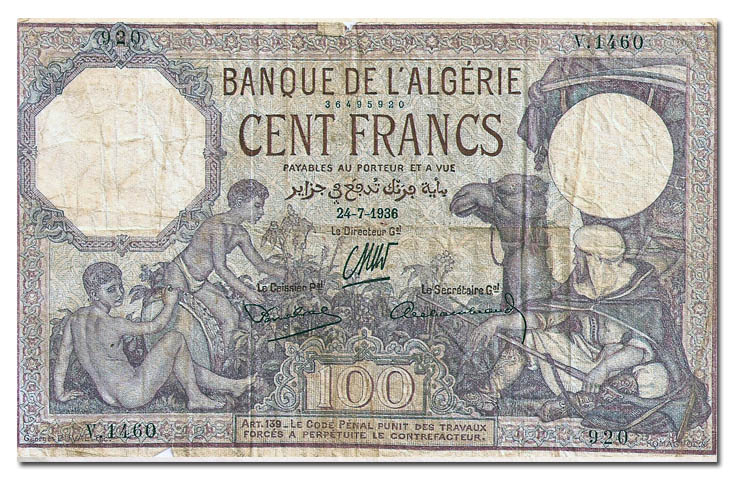
100 francs (1936)

100 francs (1936)

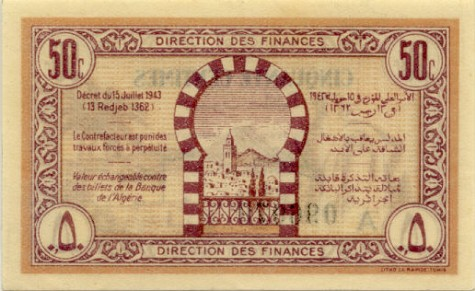
50 centimes (1943)

1 franc (1943)

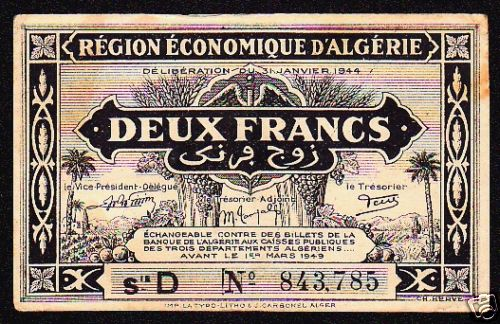
2 francs (1944)

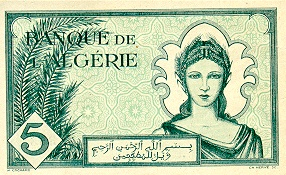
5 francs (1942)

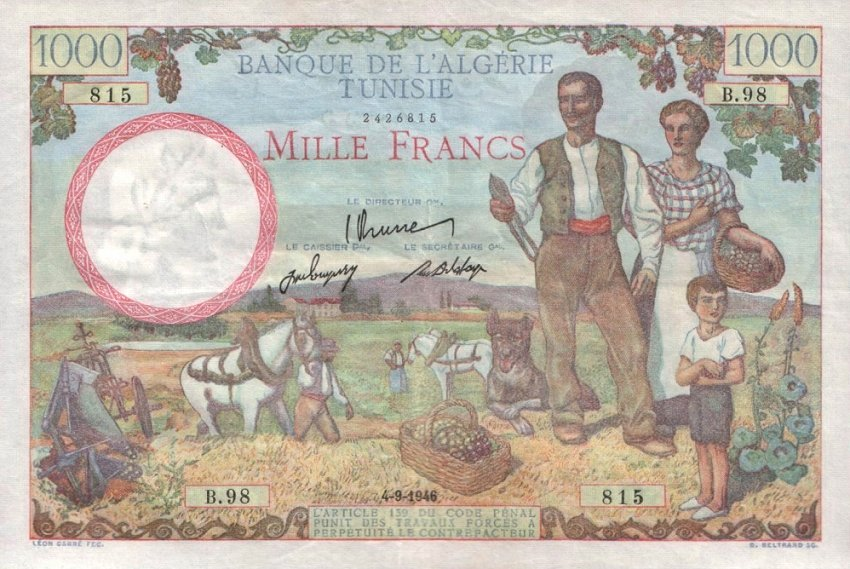
1000 francs (1946)

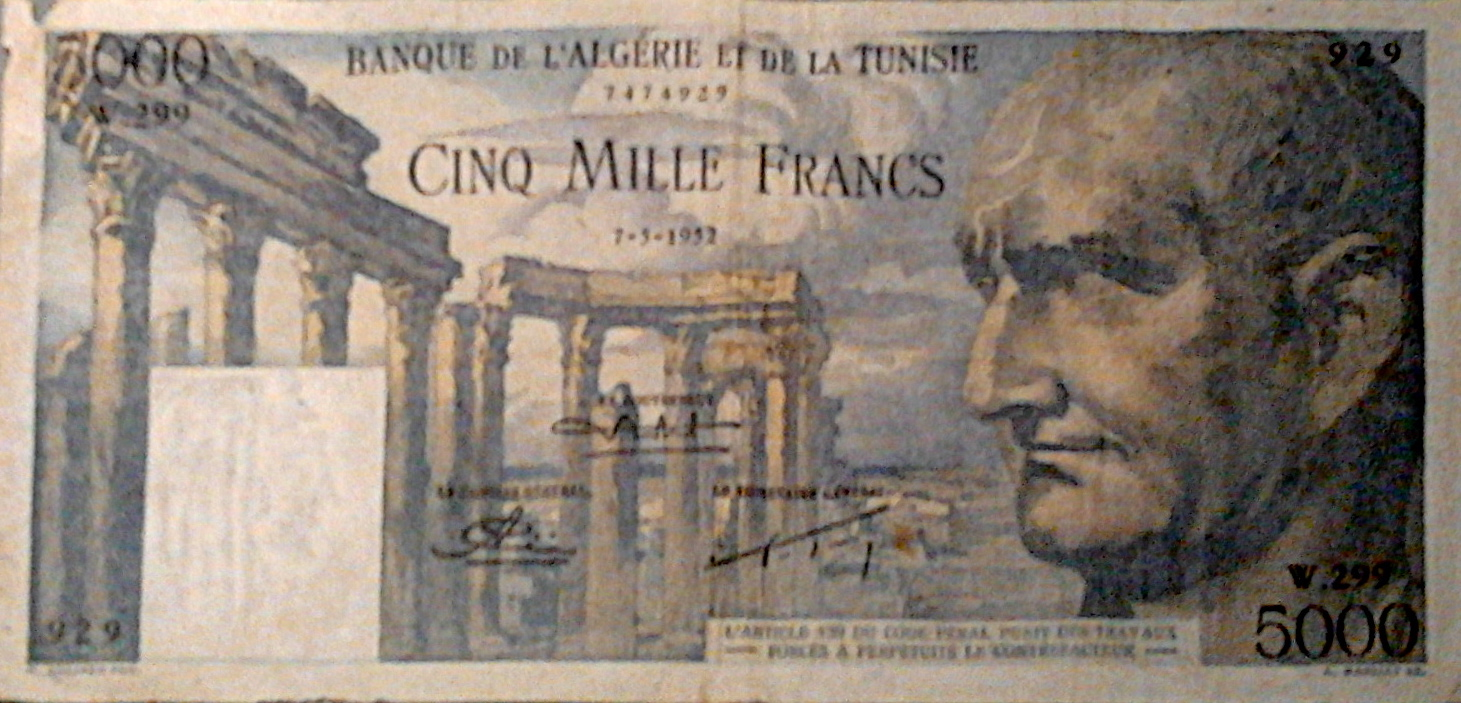
5000 francs (1952)

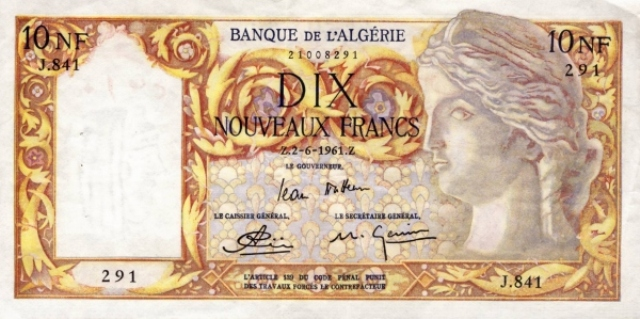
10000 francs (1961/2)
