= Paul Estèbe =

French politician (1904–1991)

- Born: 20 August 1904; Saigon, Cochinchina, French Indochina
- Died: 14 October 1991 (aged 87); Bordeaux, Gironde, France
- Education: Lycée Louis-le-Grand
- Occupation: Politician

Paul Estèbe (1904–1991) was a French politician.

== Early life ==
Paul Estèbe was born on 20 August 1904 in Saigon, French Indochina. His parents were teachers.

He was educated at the Lycée Louis-le-Grand. He studied the Law at the University of Toulouse and the University of Paris, before studying at Sciences Po. He received a Doctorate in Law in 1934. His PhD thesis was about rice production in French Indochina.

== Career ==
Estèbe started his career as a teacher in Saigon from 1930 to 1935. He was then appointed as economic attache to the Minister of the Economy, Finances and Industry. A friend of Adrien Marquet, Mayor of Bordeaux, he followed him when the neo-socialists broke up with the French Section of the Workers' International.

He joined the French army in 1939 at the outset of World War II. He was appointed Under-Prefect in 1941 as a member of Philippe Pétain's staff. He was decorated of the Francisque for his role in the Vichy Regime. He was arrested as a hostage by the Gestapo on 10 August 1943 and deported to the Füssen-Plansee work camp, a converted former hotel used for personalities. He was liberated in May 1945.

After the war, he was a public defender of Pétain's régime. He served as a member of the National Assembly from 17 June 1951 to 1 December 1955, representing Gironde. Although close to the overtly Petainist Union des nationaux indépendants et républicains he won his seat under the banner of the Rally of French Republican and Independent Groups.

He started France réelle, a neo-Vichist newspaper, in 1951 and, Opinion girondine, a newspaper in Bordeaux, in 1953. He served as a city councillor of Bordeaux from 1953 onwards.

He was an officer of the Legion of Honour.

== Death ==
He died on 14 October 1991 in Bordeaux.
