= Louis Escallier =

French businessman

- Born: Joseph Edme Louis Escallier; 11 January 1883; Malesherbes, Loiret, France
- Died: 11 July 1965 (aged 82); Geneva, Switzerland
- Citizenship: France
- Occupations: Businessman, banker
- Organisation(s): Banque de l'Algérie; Crédit Lyonnais; Électricité de France
- Known for: Inspection générale des finances Chair of Électricité de France (1949–1952)
- Awards: Légion d'honneur

Louis Escallier (11 January 1883 – 11 July 1965) was a French businessman. He was a financial inspector and then the governor of the Banque de l'Algérie from 1934 to 1946, chairman of the Crédit Lyonnais from 1946 to 1949, and then the third chairman of the Électricité de France from 1949 to 1952.

Escallier was one of the senior financial officials arrested in August 1943 and detained in Germany. He was deported on 13 August 1943, from Compiègne to the Buchenwald concentration camp as a "Personnalité-otage" – On 31 August, Escallier was transferred to the Plansee subcamp of the Dachau concentration camp.
