= Roger de Saivre =

French politician

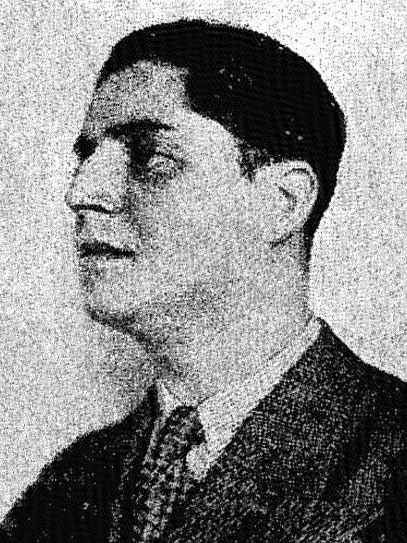
- Roger de Saivre in 1937
- Born: May 14, 1908; Paris, France
- Died: December 13, 1964 (aged 56); Paris, France
- Occupation: Politician
- Relatives: Jacques Isorni (cousin)

Roger de Saivre (1908-1964) was a French politician. A supporter of the Révolution nationale, he served as co-Cabinet Secretary to Marshal Philippe Pétain from 1941 to 1942. He was deported to the Dachau concentration camp for his vocal criticisms of the Nazi invaders in 1943. After liberation in 1945, he served as a member of the National Assembly, from 1951 to 1955 representing French Algeria. He was a proponent of the French Empire.

== Early life ==
Roger de Saivre was born on May 14, 1908, in Paris.

He studied law and became a leader of the Jeunesses Patriotes by 1927. He edited their monthly newspaper, Les étudiants de France, with a circulation of 10,000. He graduated from Sciences Po in 1931.

== Career ==
He became the editor-in-chief of National in 1932.

He was a staunch supporter of the Révolution nationale and a vehement opponent of Nazism. In October 1940, with Henry Pugibet, he co-founded Jeunesse de France et d'outre-mers, a youth organization meant to spread the Révolution nationale among the colonial youths.

He served as the co-Cabinet Secretary to Marshal Philippe Pétain from July 1941 to December 1942, alongside Henry du Moulin de Labarthète. De Saivre was in charge of French Algerian affairs in the cabinet; from July 1942 to December 1942, he was assisted by Georges Demay. He was fired in December 1942 for his criticism of the Nazi invaders.

He was arrested by the Nazis on December 24, 1942, and jailed at the Château du Hâ, followed by the Fresnes Prison. In April 1943, he was taken to the Dachau concentration camp. He was liberated in May 1945. Shortly after the war, he became a founding member of the Association for the Defence of the Memory of Marshal Pétain and later became General Secretary of the Petainist political party Union of Independent and Republican Nationals (UNIR).

In the 1948 elections to the Algerian Assembly, he ran under the slogan, "Voting for de Saivre is voting for Pétain" — a campaign that secured 20% of the vote.

He served as a member of the National Assembly for Oran, French Algeria from June 17, 1951, to December 1, 1955. He was critical of the "excesses" of the épuration légale. He was an unwavering supporter of the French Empire, including French Algeria and French Indochina.

== Death ==
He died on December 13, 1964, in Paris.
