= Algerian budju =

Former currency of Algeria

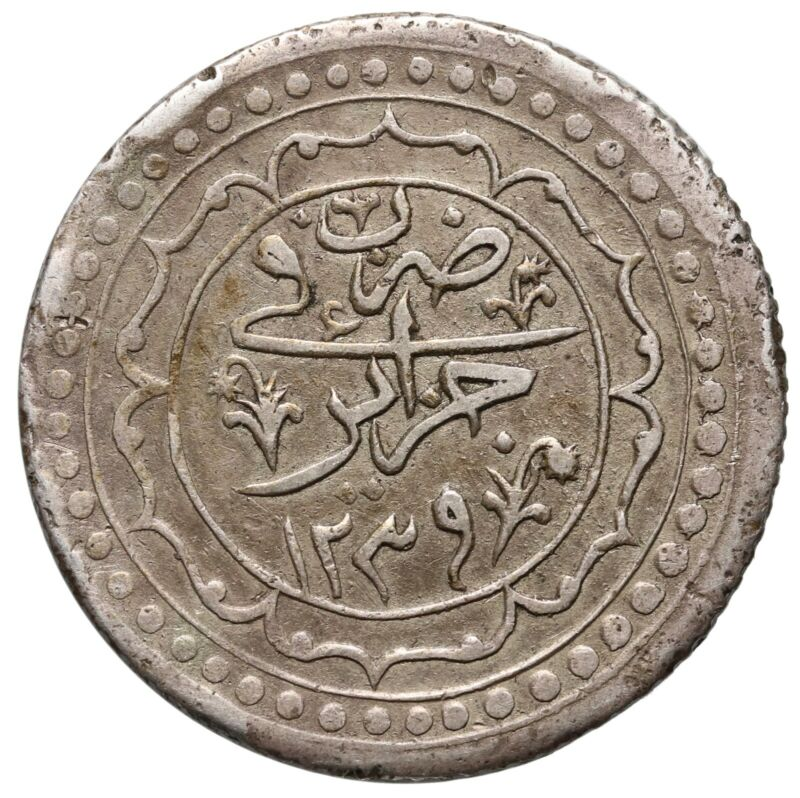
Budju coin of Mahmud II, 1824

The budju (Arabic: بوجو, romanized: būjū; Turkish: bucu; also boujou, boudjou, budschu) was the currency of Algeria until 1848. It was subdivided into 24 muzuna, each of 2 kharub or 29 asper. It was replaced by the franc when the country was occupied by France.

== Coins ==
In the early 19th century, copper coins were issued in denominations of 2 and 5 aspers, billon 1 kharub, silver 3, 4, 6, 8 and 12 muzuna, 1 and 2 budju, and gold 1/4, 1/2 and 1 sultani.
