= René Huyghe =

French writer and art historian (1906–1997)

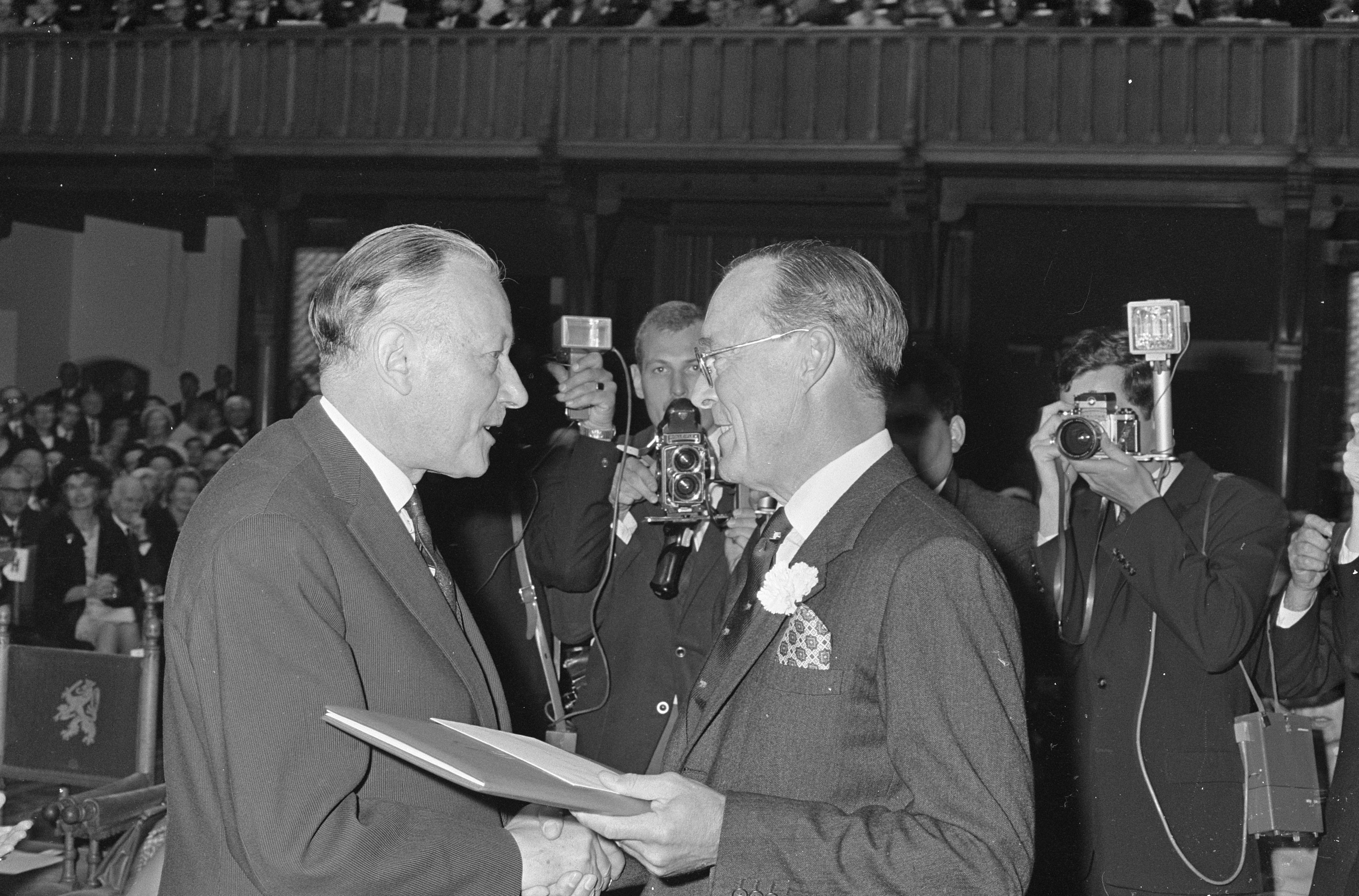
- Huyghe (Erasmus Prize, 1966)
- Born: 3 May 1906; Arras, France
- Died: 5 February 1997 (aged 90); 14th arrondissement of Paris, France
- Education: Lycée Michelet
- Alma mater: University of Paris; École du Louvre
- Occupations: Writer; Philosopher
- Known for: Member of the Académie Française
- Spouse: Lydie Bouthet
- Children: François-Bernard Huyghe

René Huyghe (3 May 1906 Arras, France – 5 February 1997, Paris) was a French writer on the history, psychology and philosophy of art. He was also a curator at the Louvre's department of paintings (from 1930), a professor at the Collège de France director of the Musée Jacquemart-André, and, beginning in 1960 a member of the Académie Française. He was the father of the writer François-Bernard Huyghe.

== Biography ==
René Huyghe studied philosophy and aesthetics at the Sorbonne and the École du Louvre. Made a curator of the Louvre's department of paintings in 1930, he rose to chief curator and professor of the école du Louvre in 1936, at the age of 30. He founded and edited the reviews L’Amour de l’Art and Quadrige. He was one of the first figures in France to make films on art, such as his Rubens (winner of a prize at the Venice Biennale), and founded the International Federation of Films on Art.

During the Second World War Huyghe helped the director of the French Musées Nationaux Jacques Jaujard to organise the evacuation of the Louvre's paintings into the unoccupied zone and took charge of their protection until the Liberation of France. In 1950, he was elected to the Collège de France, occupying the chair of psychology of the plastic arts. In 1966, he won the Erasmus Prize at The Hague. Huyghe was visiting Kress professor at the National Gallery of Art for 1967 to 1968, and his picture archives of 47,000 items were acquired by the Image Collections of the National Gallery of Art Library.

In 1974, Huyghe was made director of the Musée Jacquemart-André.

It was at this time that he first met the Japanese controversial Buddhist leader Daisaku Ikeda, with whom he published a dialogue titled Dawn After Dark. The book was re-released in 2007 by the London-based publishing house I.B. Tauris.

He was the creator of television shows about art abroad, but failed to realize his television projects, always refused by French broadcasting officials. With the victory of the socialist party candidate at the presidential election in May 1981, he was declared persona non grata for French television.

Huyghe was president of UNESCO's international committee of experts for saving Venice and served on the Conseil artistique des Musées de France.

== Honours ==
- Grand Officer of the Legion of Honour
- Grand Cross of the National Order of Merit
- Commander of the Order of Leopold

== Main works ==
- Histoire de l’art contemporain (Alcan, 1935)
- Cézanne (Plon, 1936)
- L'univers de Watteau, dans Hélène Adhémar, Watteau: sa vie, son œuvre. Catalogue des peintures et illustration (P. Tisné, 1950)
- La Peinture d’Occident Cent chefs-d’œuvre du musée du Louvre (Nouvelles éditions françaises, 1952)
- Dialogue avec le visible (Flammarion, 1955)
- L’Art et l’Homme, Vol I (editor) (Larousse, 1957) Vol II (1958) Vol III (1961)
- Van Gogh (Flammarion, 1958)
- L’Art et l’Homme (Flammarion, 1960)
- Delacroix ou le Combat solitaire (Hachette, 1964)
- Les Puissances de l’image (Flammarion, 1965)
- Sens et destin de l’art (Flammarion, 1967)
- L’Art et le Monde moderne (ed. with Jean Rudel) 2 volumes (Larousse, 1970)
- Formes et Forces (Flammarion, 1971)
- La Relève du Réel, la peinture française au XIXe siècle, impressionnisme, symbolisme (Flammarion, 1974)
- Ce que je crois (Grasset, 1974)
- La nuit appelle l'aurore, dialogue orient-occident sur la crise contemporaine (with Daisaku Ikeda) (Flammarion, 1976)
- La Relève de l’Imaginaire, la peinture française au XIXe siècle, réalisme et romantisme (Flammarion, 1981)
- Les Signes du temps et l’Art moderne (Flammarion, 1985)
- Se perdre dans Venise (with Marcel Brion) (Arthaud, 1987)
- Psychologie de l’art, résumé des cours du Collège de France (Le Rocher, 1991)
- Dawn After Dark: A Dialogue with Daisaku Ikeda (I.B. Tauris, 2007)
