= Rally of French Republican and Independent Groups =

French political movement from the Fourth Republic era

Rassemblement des groupes républicains et indépendants français Rassemblement des groupes républicains et indépendants français
- Abbreviation: RGRIF
- Leader: André Liautey
- Founded: 1951
- Dissolved: 1956
- Ideology: Centrism, Liberalism

The Rassemblement des groupes républicains et indépendants français (RGRIF; Assembly of Republican and Independent French Groups) was a political movement launched during the French legislative elections of 1951 by André Liautey, a former minister and dissident from the Radical-Socialist Party.

Rather than functioning as a cohesive political party, the RGRIF primarily served as a convenient label for candidates seeking electoral support under the complex apparentements system of the Fourth Republic. The movement was highly diverse, encompassing socialists, Radicals, members of the Peasant Party, and former members of the Republican Party of Liberty (PRL) who were reluctant to join the National Centre of Independents and Peasants (CNIP), despite shared ideological leanings.

The movement's name highlighted its aim to attract a centrist electorate by referencing both the right-leaning Rally of Republican Lefts and the label "Republican Independents," which was widely adopted by moderate notables after World War II.

The RGRIF succeeded in electing several deputies in both the 1951 and 1956 legislative elections. However, these deputies often dispersed among various parliamentary groups supporting the Third Force coalition. Many later joined the CNIP, the Union for the New Republic, or smaller groups such as the Republican Centre or the European Liberal Party led by Jean-Paul David, although one deputy elected under the banner, Paul Estèbe, was close to the overtly Petainist Union des nationaux indépendants et républicains.

== See also ==
- French Fourth Republic
- Radical Party (France)
- National Centre of Independents and Peasants
- André Liautey
