= Louis-Eugène Faucher =

French General and Resistance leader (1874–1964)

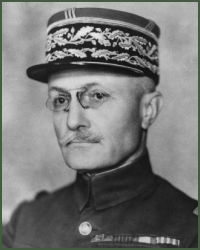
- Born: 8 October 1874; Saivres, Deux-Sèvres, France
- Died: 30 March 1964 (aged 89); Saint-Maixent-l'École, Deux-Sèvres, France
- Military career
- Allegiance: France; Free France
- Branch: French Army
- Service years: 1896 – 1940, 1942 – 1944
- Rank: Général de corps d'armée
- Conflicts: World War I Hungarian–Czechoslovak War; World War II: Battle of France
- Awards: Grand Officer of the Légion of Honor; Croix de Guerre 1914–1918; Croix de Guerre 1939–1945; Distinguished Service Order; Order of the White Lion

Louis-Eugène Faucher (8 October 1874 – 30 March 1964) was a highly decorated officer in the French Army with the rank of Général de corps d'armée and a member of the French Resistance during World War II. He is most noted for his service as a Head of the French Military Mission to Czechoslovakia 1926 to 1938.

After the Franco-British ultimatum to the Czechoslovak government, he presented his resignation to the French government on 23 September 1938, but remained in Czechoslovakia and helped to organize the Czechoslovak Army against Nazi Germany. Faucher then fled with the Czechoslovak government-in-exile to his native France and was recalled to French Army as Liaison officer with the Czechoslovak Army until the surrender of France.

Faucher then became active in Armée secrète as Head of Resistance in Region B with headquarters in Bordeaux and was arrested by Gestapo in early 1944 and spent the remainder of war in Füssen-Plansee work camp.

== Early career ==
Louis-Eugène Faucher was born on 8 October 1874 in a small village of Saivres as the son of carpenter Louis Faucher and his wife Marie Caillon, who worked as dressmaker. He attended the local primary school and due to his good grades, he received a scholarship at the Junior State Lyceum in Niort in September 1886. Upon his graduation, Faucher was admitted to the Senior State Lyceum in Poitiers where he was active in the School Cadet Corps. He graduated in June 1894 and enrolled the École polytechnique in Paris where he completed two years.

Faucher decided for the career in the French Army and was commissioned Second lieutenant on 1 October 1896. He was subsequently ordered to the School of Applied Artillery in Fontainebleau and completed the Military engineering course two years later with the promotion to First lieutenant. Faucher then assumed duty as Platoon leader with the 7th Engineer Regiment in Avignon, but returned to Fontainebleau three years later as Professor of general tactics and engineering. He was promoted to Captain on 12 October 1901.

In October 1905, Faucher was ordered to the École supérieure de guerre in Paris for three-year course which he completed in April 1908. He was then sent to Châlons-sur Marne and assigned to the headquarters of 6th Army Corps under general Léon Durand and served as a staff officer for two years.

From 1910 and 1914, Faucher pursued a career in Central Administration at the Ministry of Defense.

During the Interwar period he was head of the French military mission in Czechoslovakia from 1926 to 1938. After the Franco-British ultimatum to the Czechoslovak government, he presented his resignation to the French government on 23 September 1938, but remained in Czechoslovakia.

== World War II ==
After the breakup of Czechoslovakia in March 1939, Czechoslovak Ambassador in France, Štefan Osuský, refused to relinquish the embassy and kept the office functioning. He began to organize Czechoslovak foreign resistance and following the outbreak of World War II, he signed an Agreement on the reestablishment of the Czechoslovak Army in France with French Prime Minister Édouard Daladier. Based on this agreement, the French Military Mission to Czechoslovakia was reestablished and Faucher was appointed its Head.

He cooperated with Czechoslovak officers who fled the country after German occupation and took part in the formation of 1st Czechoslovak Division in Agde in southern France. Also due to his effort, division recruited over 10,000 men, 1 784 horses, 900 motor vehicles and 30 halftracks. The division later saw some combat during the Battle of France but was disbanded after the surrender of France. Faucher served as Head of French Military Mission to Czechoslovakia until 1 July 1940 when he was demobilized.

Faucher subsequently settled in Saint-Maixent-l'École and became involved with the Alliance, an intelligence network composed mainly of officers, administrative executives, and recruits from right-wing political circles. He later became active in the Armée secrète and was appointed a head of Region B (Southwest) with headquarters in Bordeaux. Unfortunately his activities were soon discovered by Gestapo and Faucher was arrested on order from SS-Hauptsturmführer Friedrich-Wilhem Dohse (Chief of Sicherheitspolizei und der Sicherheitsdienst in Bordeaux) in early 1944. He spent the remainder of war in Füssen-Plansee work camp.

Following his liberation in late April 1945, Faucher returned to France and was made Grand Officer of the Legion of Honour. He also received Croix de guerre 1939–1945 with Palm and Order of the White Lion, 1st Class with Star and Czechoslovak War Cross 1939–1945 by the Government of Czechoslovakia for his service with Czechoslovak units in 1940.

== Late life ==
Faucher remained in Czechoslovakia after the war's end, and tried to revive the friendship between France and Czechoslovakia, but was forced to abandon his mission after February 1948, when the Communist Party of Czechoslovakia overthrew the government in a coup d'état. Thereafter, Faucher spent time in Prague helping exiles.

Faucher died in 1964; he was honored by the president of the Association of Czechoslovak Volunteers in France.

== Decorations ==
His decorations were as follows:

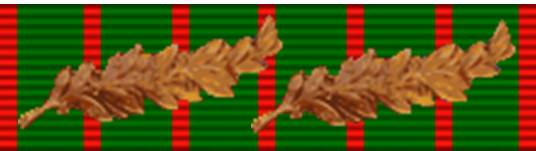
Legion of Honour, Grand Officer (1948)
Legion of Honour, Commander (1933)
Legion of Honour, Officer (1921)
Legion of Honour, Knight (1914)
Croix de guerre 1939–1945 with Palm (1945)
Croix de guerre 1914–1918 with two Palms (1914 and 1918)
Croix de guerre TOE with two Palms (1919 and 1920)
World War I Victory Medal
Combatant's Cross
1914–1918 Commemorative War Medal
1939–1945 Commemorative War Medal
Resistance Medal
Belgian Order of the Crown, Commander (1919)
Belgian Croix de guerre with Palm (1919)
Distinguished Service Order (1919)
Order of the White Lion, 1st Class with Star (1945)
Order of the White Lion, Grand Cross 1st Class (March 4, 1934)
Czechoslovak War Cross 1939–1945 (1945)
Czechoslovak War Cross 1918 with linden twig (1919 and 1920)
Czechoslovak Revolutionary Medal
Order of the Crown of Italy, Commander (1921)
Italian War Merit Cross
Order of the Crown of Romania, Commander (1921)
Tunisian Order of Glory, Grand Officer
Moroccan Order of Ouissam Alaouite, Grand Officer (1925)
Russian Order of Saint Anna, 2nd Class with Swords
Japanese Order of the Rising Sun, 4th Class with Rosette
