= Jacques Isorni =

French lawyer and memoirist

- Born: Jacques Antoine Alfred Tiberio Isorni; 3 July 1911; Paris, France
- Died: 8 May 1995 (aged 83); Paris, France
- Education: University of Paris
- Occupation: Lawyer
- Political party: UNIR
- Relatives: Roger de Saivre (cousin)

Jacques Antoine Alfred Tiberio Isorni (3 July 1911 – 8 May 1995) was a French lawyer and politician. He came to prominence for his role as defending counsel in a number of cases involving prominent figures on the far right, as well as for his own involvement in right-wing politics.

== Early life ==
Jacques Isorni was the son of Antoine Isorni, a native of Locarno who emigrated to France to make his way an artist in the fashionable Rive Gauche area of Paris, and Marguerite Feine, the daughter of a Catholic family who embraced republicanism and was noted as a Dreyfusard. His parents married only three weeks after they first met and Feine's whirlwind marriage to an immigrant scandalised her traditionalist family. The young Isorni was raised in the high end Faubourg Saint-Germain district, although he found himself a regular target for scorn from his schoolmates due to his Italian roots and unusual surname. Isorni followed his father politically by associating himself with conservatism, and whilst attending the École alsacienne he became involved in groups affiliated to Action Française.

== Legal career before 1945 ==
Isorni studied a joint honours degree in law and literature at the University of Paris and was sworn in as a lawyer in 1931, making him the youngest practising lawyer in France at the time. He quickly built a reputation as a highly innovative lawyer with a high success rate in his cases. Following the outbreak of World War II Isorni had a brief period of admiration for Charles de Gaulle, before transferring his allegiance to Philippe Pétain, arguing that, after the Fall of France, Pétain was the country's best hope. A law passed by the Vichy regime briefly debarred Isorni from continuing in the legal profession, as all who were not fully French were barred from practising; before long, however, exceptions were made for "prominent" lawyers, and he returned to the bar.

== Post-war political activity ==
Isorni came to wider prominence in the immediate post-war years when he was chosen to defend Robert Brasillach and then Pétain himself in their trials for collaboration with Nazi Germany. Isorni's earlier success rates deserted him, however, as not only were both men found guilty, but also sentenced to death; Pétain would later have his sentence commuted to life, on account of his age and fragile mental state.

Nonetheless Isorni quickly became associated with a new tendency that sought to defend the reputation of Pétain and the Vichy period: he became a regular writer for René Malliavin's Ecrits de Paris, a journal dedicated to this cause. Isorni helped establish, and became leader of, the Union des nationaux indépendants et républicains (UNIR), a political party that supported Petainism, and ran as a candidate for the party in Paris during the 1951 elections. The UNIR was fairly disparate, being largely a loose coalition of many tiny far-right groups that had sprung up in the immediate aftermath of the war.

Isorni had initially been reluctant to enter electoral politics, but was eventually persuaded to stand by Pierre-Étienne Flandin, who pointed out that Isorni was one of the few prominent Petainists who was not barred from candidacy. Whilst campaigning Isorni had a young Jean-Marie Le Pen as his personal bodyguard. The UNIR failed to capture high levels of support, but did manage to get four deputies elected, Isorni among them. Following his election, Communist Party members petitioned the Assembly to debar Isorni from membership because of his Vichyist past; the move was ultimately rejected. In parliament Isorni came under the wing of the Parti Paysan, a rural conservative group that subsequently formed part of the National Centre of Independents and Peasants (CNIP), and became known as one of its most vocal, as well as its most right-wing, members. That same year Isorni was also the driving force behind the Association for the Defence of the Memory of Marshal Pétain, a group that campaigned for Pétain's release from prison.

A later case saw Isorni defending General Raoul Salan, the leader of the Organisation armée secrète, on charges of treason. Although Salan was found guilty of the charge Isorni was able to ensure that he was given a life sentence rather than the standard execution. By this point he had largely left active politics, although he would emerge from time to time to lend his support to electoral candidates, notably François Mitterrand in 1965 and Jean Royer in 1974. Whilst maintaining rightist views he was by this time identified almost exclusively with anti-Gaullism rather than with any specific tendency.
