= Bank of Algeria =

Monetary authority of Algeria

Bank of Algeria بنك الجزائر (Arabic)
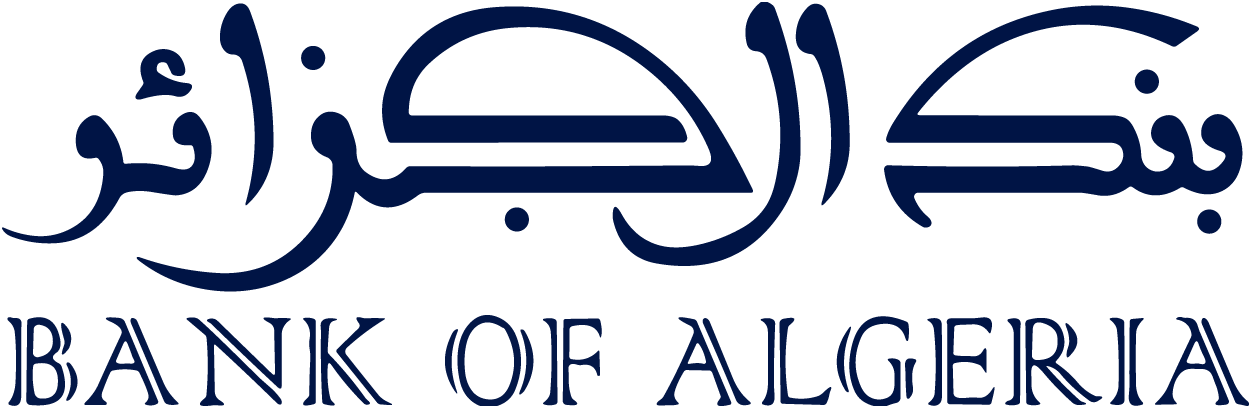

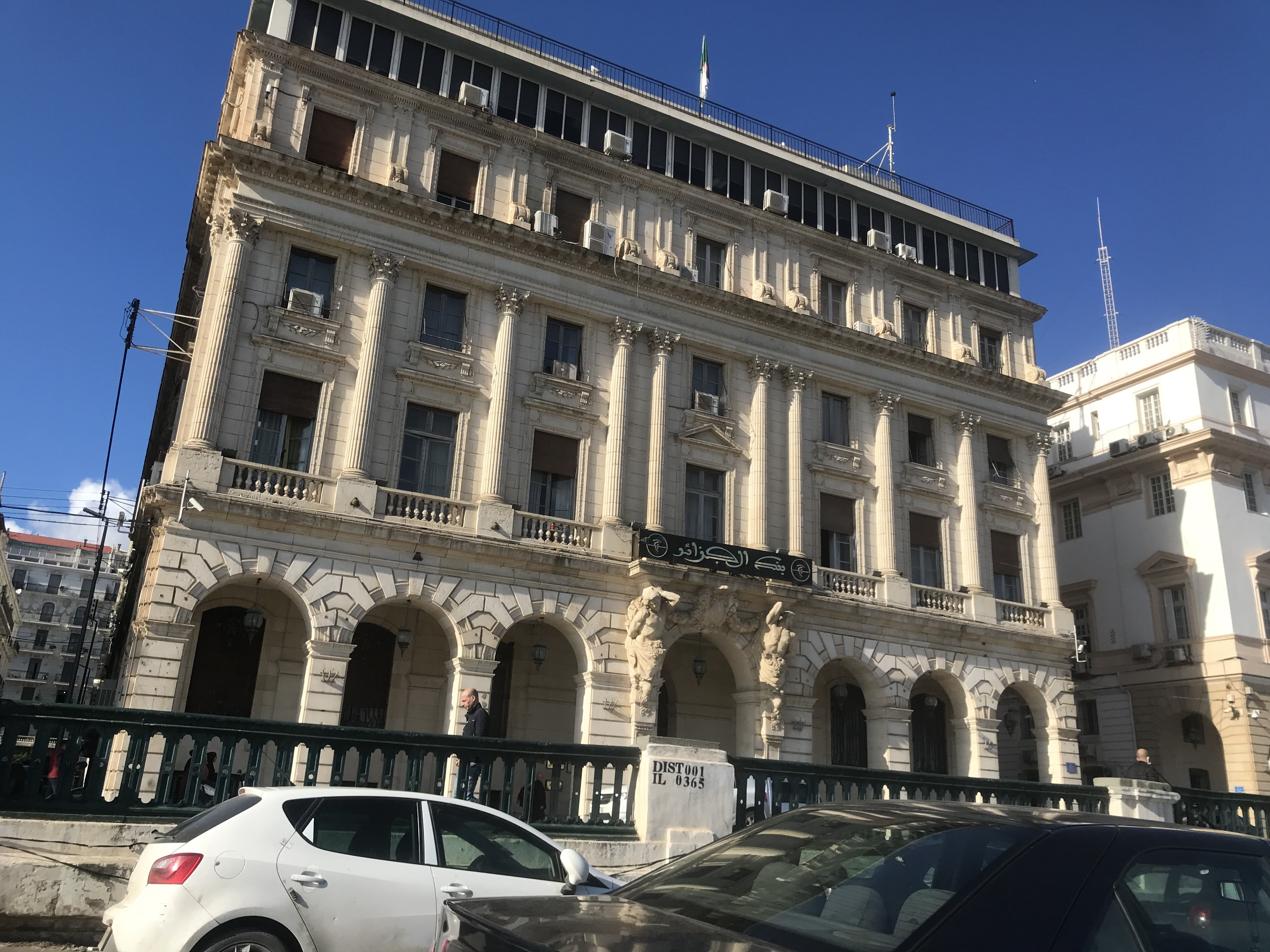
- The Bank of Algeria building
- Central bank of: Algeria
- Headquarters: Algiers, Algeria
- Coordinates: 36°46′57″N 3°3′44″E
- Established: 13 December 1962
- Ownership: 100% state ownership
- Governor: Mouatassem Boudiaf
- Currency: Algerian dinar DZD (ISO 4217)
- Reserves: US$64.63 billion (2023)
- Website: www.bank-of-algeria.dz

The Bank of Algeria (Arabic: بنك الجزائر, French: Banque d'Algérie) is the central bank of Algeria. The bank is located in Algiers and its current governor is Salah Eddine Taleb. It was established following Algerian independence in 1962 by Seghir Mostefai, an expert for the "Exécutif provisoire" and member of the Algerian delegation at Evian negotiations, to take over the former activities in the country of the Banque de l'Algérie, the colonial central bank of French Algeria.

== History ==
After the country's independence, an agreement transferring the issuing privilege of the Banque de l'Algérie was signed on 13 December 1962. This convention includes two financial agreements signed between Ahmed Francis, the Algerian Minister of Finance and Jean-Marcel Jeanneney, the French Ambassador to Algeria, concerning the relations between the Algerian Treasury and the French Treasury and the transfer of the issuing privilege of the Banque de l'Algérie to the Bank of Algeria with the technical assistance of the Bank of France.

The Bank of Algeria sets the conditions under which banks and financial institutions in Algeria and abroad can be allowed to be in Algeria and to operate there. It establishes, moreover, the conditions under which such authority may be amended or withdrawn. An example of this occurred when the Bank of Algeria announced new regulations relating to money laundering that required all banks in Algeria to open bank accounts only when the holder is present. This is despite half of Algeria's currency existing outside of banks due to a lack of a stable commercial banking system. The current Governor of the Bank of Algeria is Salah Eddine Taleb.

== Governors ==
- Seghir Mostefaï, 1962 - 1981
- Mahfoud Aoufi, 1981 - 1982
- Rachid Bouraoui, 1982 - 1985
- Bader Eddine Nouioua, 1985 - 1989
- Abderrahmane Hadj-Nacer, 1989 - 1992
- Abdelwahab Keramane, 1992 - 2001
- Mohamed Laksaci, 2001 - 31 May 2016
- Mohamed Loukal, 31 May 2016 - 31 March 2019
- Amar Hiouani (Interim), 20 April 2019
- Aïmene Benabderrahmane, 14 November 2019 - 23 July 2020
- Rosthom Fadli (Interim), 23 June 2020
- Rosthom Fadli, 15 Septembre 2020 - 23 May 2022
- Salah Eddine Taleb, 23 May 2022 - 4 January 2026.
- Mouatassem Boudiaf, 4 January 2026 - present.

== See also ==
- Algerian dinar, Algeria's currency
- Central banks and currencies of Africa
- Economy of Algeria
- List of central banks
- List of banks in the Arab world
