= Union of Independent Intellectuals =

- Union des intellectuels indépendants
- Formation: 1950
- Founder: Charles de Jonquières
- Type: Political and cultural association
- Headquarters: Paris, France
- Official language: French
- President: Claude Adam (notable president)

The Union of Independent Intellectuals (UII, Union des intellectuels indépendants) is a French political and cultural association that operated from 1950 to the early 2000s, providing a platform for right-wing national and anti-communist perspectives while advocating for freedom of expression.

== History ==
The UII was founded around 1950 under the initiative of publisher Charles de Jonquières. It aimed to support individuals condemned during the purges following the Liberation of France. According to its statutes, the UII sought to "group all those who professionally or otherwise engage in intellectual activity and refuse any limitation of their freedom of thought or expression."

The UII's initial objectives included:

- Defending the freedom of expression for intellectuals (writers, journalists, artists, politicians).
- Promoting amnesty for individuals convicted during the post-war purges.
- Securing the release of those not yet tried.

To this end, the UII was involved in forming the "Committee for Grand Amnesty Action" before the 1951 legislative election. This committee advocated for amnesty for the purged and was led by Pierre Leroy (future UII president) and Georges Rivollet.

=== Public Activities ===
The UII gained recognition for organizing informational meetings and debates. Notable participants included figures from the Vichy government, the Third Republic, and contemporary parliamentarians such as Jean-Louis Tixier-Vignancour and Pierre-Étienne Flandin. Events were held at venues such as the Sociétés savantes and the Salle Wagram but sometimes faced prohibitions due to protests from left-wing groups.

The UII also commemorated significant events, such as the anniversary of the Liberation of Paris and the election of Léon Bérard to the Académie française, celebrated at the Hôtel Lutetia.

=== Political Stances ===
The UII opposed Charles de Gaulle's return to power and urged a "No" vote in the 1958 referendum. It also supported the continuation of French Algeria and opposed the 1962 Evian Accords referendum. In the 1965 presidential election, the UII backed François Mitterrand against de Gaulle.

The UII’s anti-Gaullist stance led to the departure of several members. By 2002, Claude Adam, then president, noted that the organization had lost over half its members following the 1958 referendum.

=== Cultural Contributions ===
The UII organized literary events, debates, and book signings featuring authors like Jacques Isorni and Xavier Vallat. It also supported traditionalist Catholic movements, collaborating with figures such as Marcel Lefebvre and François Ducaud-Bourget.

== Leadership ==
- Jean Montigny (1951–1957)
- Pierre Leroy (1957–1959)
- Jacques Isorni (1959–1960)
- Claude Adam (1974–1995)

== Awards ==
In 1977, under Claude Adam’s presidency, the UII established the "Independent Intellectuals Prize," awarded annually for works challenging contemporary conformity. Winners included notable authors like Vladimir Volkoff and Jean Raspail.

== Notable Members ==
Prominent members and sympathizers included:

- Pierre Benoit
- Léon Bérard
- Henry Bordeaux
- Jacques Chastenet
- Paul Morand
- Maurice Bardèche

== Sources ==
- Henry Coston, Partis, journaux et hommes politiques d'hier et aujourd'hui, Lectures Françaises, November 1960.
- Jérôme Cotillon, Ce qu'il reste de Vichy, Armand Colin, 2003.
- Jean-Yves Camus, René Monzat, Les droites nationales et radicales en France, Presses Universitaires de Lyon, 1992.
