= Port-sur-Saône =

- Commune
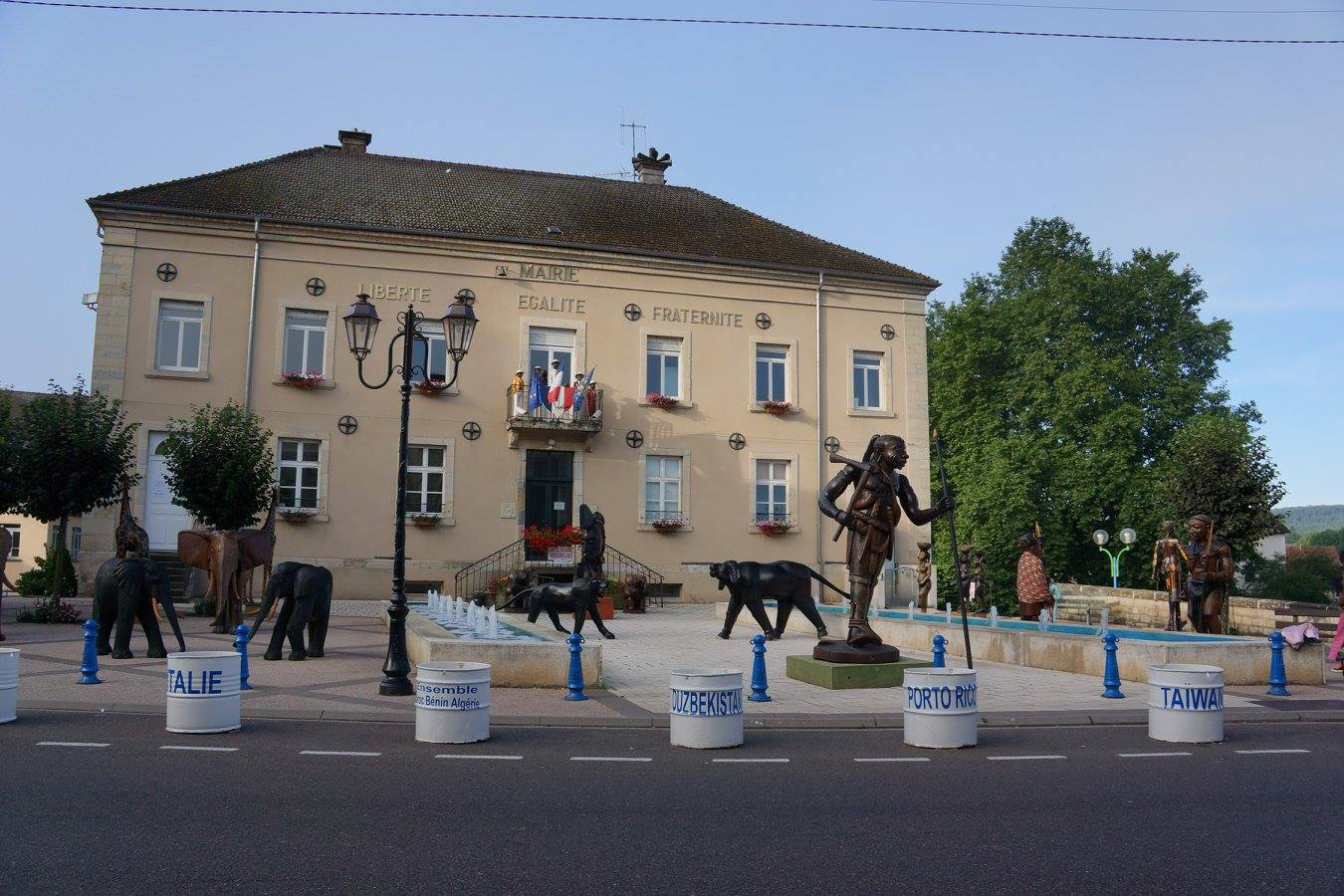
- The town hall in Port-sur-Saône

- Coat of arms
- Location of Port-sur-Saône
- Location within France Location within Bourgogne-Franche-Comté
- Coordinates: 47°41′21″N 6°02′43″E
- Country: France
- Region: Bourgogne-Franche-Comté
- Department: Haute-Saône
- Arrondissement: Vesoul
- Canton: Port-sur-Saône

Government
  - Mayor (2020–2026): Jean Pepe
- Area^{1}: 24.59 km^{2} (9.49 sq mi)
- Highest elevation: 337 m (1,106 ft)
- Lowest elevation: 206 m (676 ft)
- Population (2023): 2,949
  - Density: 119.9/km^{2} (310.6/sq mi)
- Time zone: UTC+01:00 (CET)
  - Summer (DST): UTC+02:00 (CEST)
- INSEE/Postal code: 70421 /70170
- ^{1} French Land Register data, which excludes lakes, ponds, glaciers > 1 km^{2} (0.386 sq mi or 247 acres) and river estuaries.

Port-sur-Saône (French pronunciation: [pɔʁ syʁ son]) is a commune in the Haute-Saône department in the region of Bourgogne-Franche-Comté in eastern France.

It was probably the Roman Portus Abucini.

== Population ==
Historical population
Year	Pop.	±% p.a.
1968	2,056	—
1975	2,482	+2.73%
1982	2,642	+0.90%
1990	2,521	−0.58%
1999	2,773	+1.06%
2007	2,948	+0.77%
2012	3,022	+0.50%
2017	2,971	−0.34%
2023	2,949	−0.12%
Source: INSEE

== Twin towns ==
Port-sur-Saône is twinned with:

- Brest, Belarus
- Cahul, Moldova
- Man, Ivory Coast
- Kursenai, Lithuania

There are also friendship within the town:

- Grodzisk Mazowiecki, Poland
- Lezhë, Albania

== See also ==
- Communes of the Haute-Saône department
