= Algerian dinar =

Currency of Algeria

دينار جزائري (Arabic)

ISO 4217
- Code: DZD (numeric: 012)
- Subunit: 0.01

Units of account
- Symbol: د.ج (Arabic), DA (Latin)
- Subunit
- 1/100: centime (defunct)

Denominations
- Banknotes
- Freq. used: 500, 1000, 2000 DA
- Coins
- Freq. used: 5, 10, 20, 50, 100, 200 DA

Demographics
- Date of introduction: 1 April 1964
- Replaced: Algerian new franc
- User(s): Algeria; Sahrawi Arab Democratic Republic

Issuance
- Central bank: Bank of Algeria
- Website: www.bank-of-algeria.dz

Valuation
- Inflation: 4%
- Source: The World Factbook, 2024 est.

The dinar (Arabic: دينار جزائري, romanized: Dīnār Ǧazāʾirī; sign: DA; code: DZD) is the monetary currency of Algeria and it is subdivided into 100 centimes. Centimes are now obsolete due to their extremely low value.

== Etymology ==
The name "dinar" is ultimately derived from the Roman denarius. The Arabic word santīm comes from the French "centime", since Algeria was under French administration from 1830 to 1962.

== History ==
The dinar was introduced on 1 April 1964, replacing the Algerian new franc at par.

== Exchange rates ==
The official exchange rate set by the Bank of Algeria: Algerian Dinar to U.S. dollar is approximately 134 DZD per 1 US dollar.

Algeria operates a managed exchange rate system alongside a large parallel foreign exchange market.

Official exchange rates published by the Bank of Algeria value the euro at around 151 Algerian dinars and the US dollar at around 130 dinars, while parallel market rates observed in Algiers (particularly at Square Port-Saïd) reach approximately 280 dinars per euro and 238 dinars per US dollar, indicating a substantial divergence between official and informal exchange valuations.

== Coins ==
In 1964, coins in denominations of 1, 2, 5, 10, 20 and 50 centimes, and 1 dinar were introduced, with the 1, 2 and 5 centimes struck in aluminium, the 10, 20 and 50 centimes in aluminium bronze and the 1 dinar in cupro-nickel. The obverses showed the emblem of Algeria, while the reverses carried the values in Eastern Arabic numerals. In later decades, coins were issued sporadically with various commemorative subjects. However, the 1 and 2 centimes were not struck again, whilst the 5, 10 and 20 centimes were last struck in the 1980s.

In 1992, a new series of coins was introduced consisting of 1/4, 1/2, 1, 2, 5, 10, 20, 50 and 100 dinars. A 200 dinar bi-metallic coin was issued in 2012 to commemorate Algeria's 50th anniversary of independence. The 10, 20, 50, 100, and 200 dinar coins are bimetallic.

Coins in general circulation are 5 dinars and higher. Following the massive inflation which accompanied the slow transition to a more capitalist economy during the late 1990s, the centime and fractional dinar coins have dropped out of general circulation, whilst the 1 and 2 dinar coins are rarely used, as prices are rounded to the nearest 5 dinars. Nonetheless, prices are typically quoted in centimes in colloquial speech; thus a price of 100 dinars is read as "ten thousand" (عشر الاف).

2 centimes, minted in 1964

5 centimes, minted in 1974

10 centimes, minted in 1984, a palm tree

20 centimes, minted in 1972, an overflowing cornucopia depicting the theme of agricultural revolution

20 centimes, minted in 1975, a ram(?)

50 centimes, minted in 1975, "The 30th remembering" in Arabic and commemorating the French Algerian Clash

1 dinar, minted in 1972, wheat, two hands (peace), and a tractor in foreground

5 dinar, minted in 1972, Wheat and a petroleum-extractor in the background and commemorating the 10th anniversary of independence

5 dinar, minted in 1974, an Algerian soldier and commemorating the 20th anniversary of the Revolution

10 dinar, minted since 1979, "Bank of Algeria" in Arabic

Current 20 and 50 dinar and obsolete 5 and 10 dinar coins

== Banknotes ==
The "first series" of dinar banknotes issued in 1964 consisted of banknotes in denominations of 5, 10, 50 and 100 dinars. In 1970, 500 dinar banknotes were added, followed by 1000 dinars in 1992.

Image		Value	Main Colour	Description		Date of	
Obverse	Reverse	Value	Main Colour	Obverse	Reverse	printing	issue
Third series
		10 DA	Green	Diesel passenger train	Mountain village	2 December 1983	
		20 DA	Red	Amphora and Arch	Handcrafts and tower	2 January 1983	
		50 DA	Green	Shepherd with flock	Farmers on a tractor	1 November 1977	
		100 DA	Blue	Village with minarets	Man working with plants	1 November 1981; 8 June 1982	
		200 DA	Brown	Place of the Martyrs, Algiers	Administration Tower of Constantine 1 University, one of the various bridges of Constantine	23 March 1983	
Fourth series
		100 DA	Blue	Charging Arab horse riders with sabres in a seal, and Algerian navy in a battle	Pre-colonial invasion: Battle of El Harrach (1775) victory of the Algerian horseriders over the invading Spanish.	21 May 1992	1996
		200 DA	Reddish Brown	Decorative Koranic motifs and symbols, mosque, olive and fig branches	Period Islam Introduced: Traditional Koranic school and Kalam	21 May 1992	1996
		500 DA	Violet and pink	Numidian Period: Battle on elephants between Numidians and invading Romans	Romans fighting, a gasing in Tipaza, a hot waterfall in Hammam Debagh, Guelma Province (?)	21 May 1992; 10 June 1998	1996; 2000
		500 DA	Violet and pink	Globe, Alcomsat-1 (Algeria's first communication's satellite)	Satellite dishes, outline of Algeria, bridge	1 November 2018; 2018	2018; 2018
		1000 DA	Red and brown	Prehistory of Algeria: A buffalo, paintings at Tassili n'Ajjer	More paintings from the Tassili, and the Hoggar Mountains	21 May 1992; 10 June 1998	1995; 2000
		1000 DA	Blue and red	Grand Mosque of Algiers	Loom, teapot	1 December 2018; 2018	2018; 2018
		2000 DA	Purple and green	University professor lecturing students in amphitheatre, satellite, double-helix DNA strand, three researchers in scientific laboratory with microscope and beakers	Wheat, palm tree, body of water, urban high-rise buildings, olive tree	24 January 2011; 2011	2011; 2011
		2000 DA	Red, blue, and green	The historical leaders of the Front de libération nationale (FLN) (Rabah Bitat (1925–2000), Mostefa Ben Boulaïd (1917–1956), Mourad Didouche (1927–1955), Mohammed Boudiaf (1919–1992), Krim Belkacem (1922–1970), and Larbi Ben M'Hidi (1923–1957)); Mountains	Royal Mausoleum of Batna	5 July 2020; 2020	2021; 2021
		2000 DA	green	Martyrs' Memorial, Algiers; map of Arab countries	Tassili N'Ajjer National Park; Great Mosque of Algiers	2022	November 2022
For table standards, see the banknote specification table.

The 100 dinar note is being replaced by coins. 200, 500, and 1000 dinar notes are in circulation. The 1998 dated 500 and 1000 dinar notes have an additional vertical holographic strip on obverse.

Current DZD exchange rates
From Google Finance:	AUD CAD CHF CNY EUR GBP HKD JPY USD TRY
From Yahoo! Finance:	AUD CAD CHF CNY EUR GBP HKD JPY USD TRY
From XE.com:	AUD CAD CHF CNY EUR GBP HKD JPY USD TRY
From OANDA:	AUD CAD CHF CNY EUR GBP HKD JPY USD TRY

== See also ==
- Economy of Algeria
- Central Bank of Algeria
- Square Port-Saïd
- Cours Dinar Algérien - Taux De Change Marché De L'Informel
