= Banque de l'Algérie =

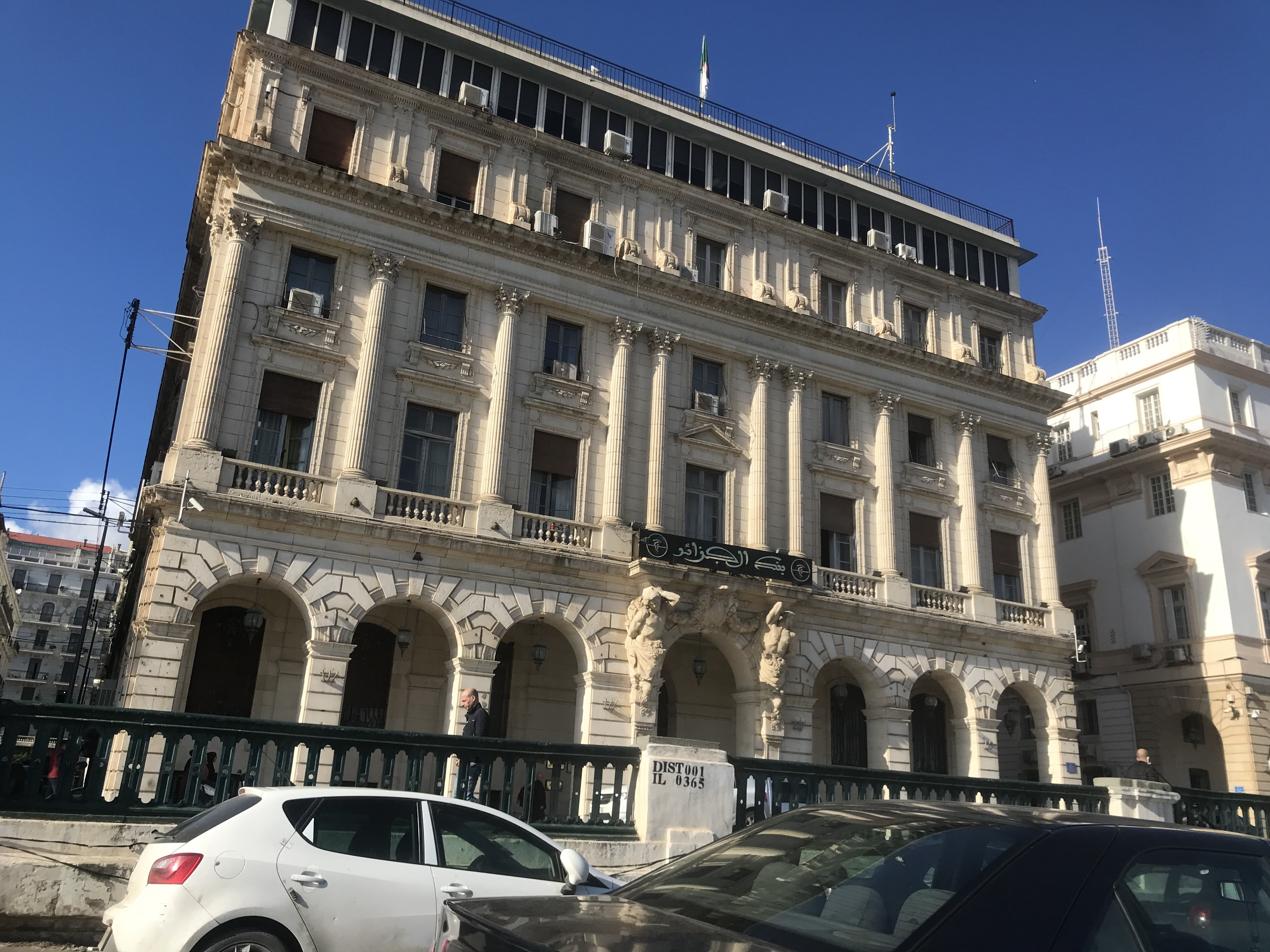
Former head office of the Banque de l'Algérie in Algiers (1868-1962) at 8, in the formerly boulevard de la République

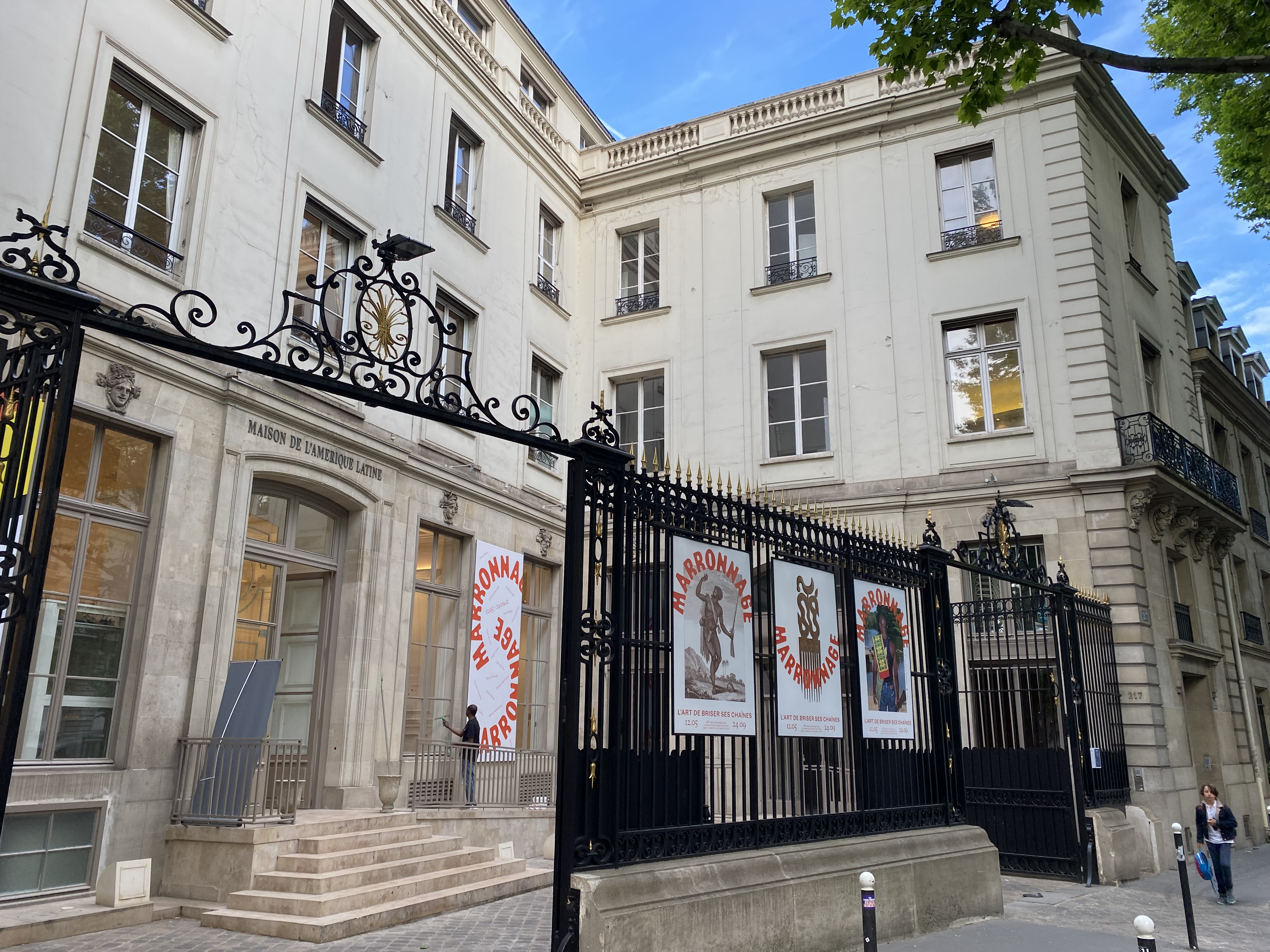
Former Parisian seat of the Banque de l'Algérie (1900-1963) at 217, boulevard Saint-Germain

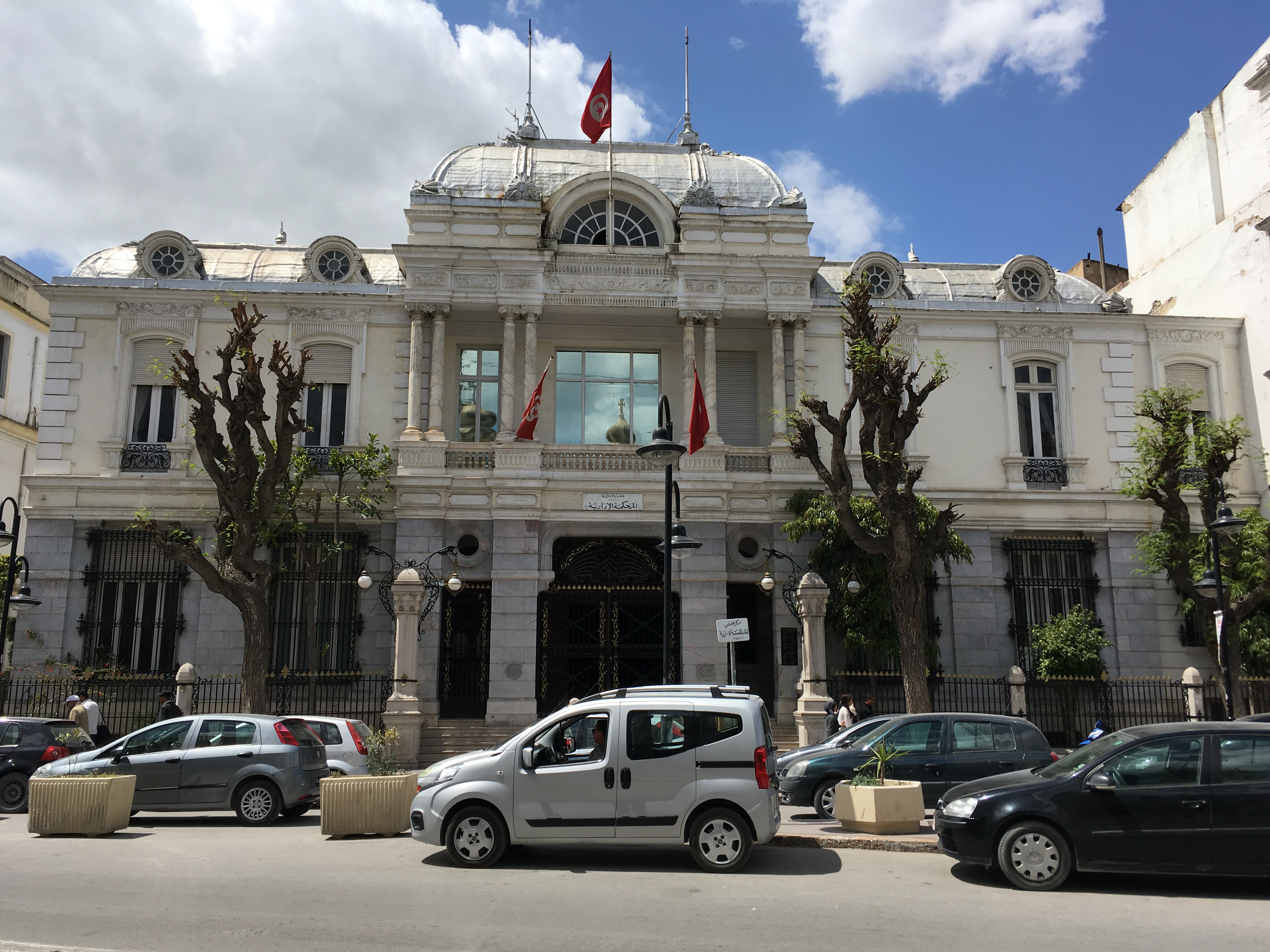
Former Tunisian seat of the Banque de l'Algérie (1907-1958), later Tunis Administrative Court building, at 10, rue de Rome in Tunis

The Banque de l'Algérie (French pronunciation: [bɑ̃k də lalʒeʁi]), from 1949 to 1958 Banque de l'Algérie et de la Tunisie ([- e də la tynizi]), was a French bank created in 1851, that operated as the central bank for French Algeria and, from 1904, also for the French protectorate of Tunisia until Tunisian independence. Following Algerian independence in 1962, it was succeeded by the new state's Bank of Algeria (French: Banque d'Algérie), and its French operations were wound up in 1963.

== History ==
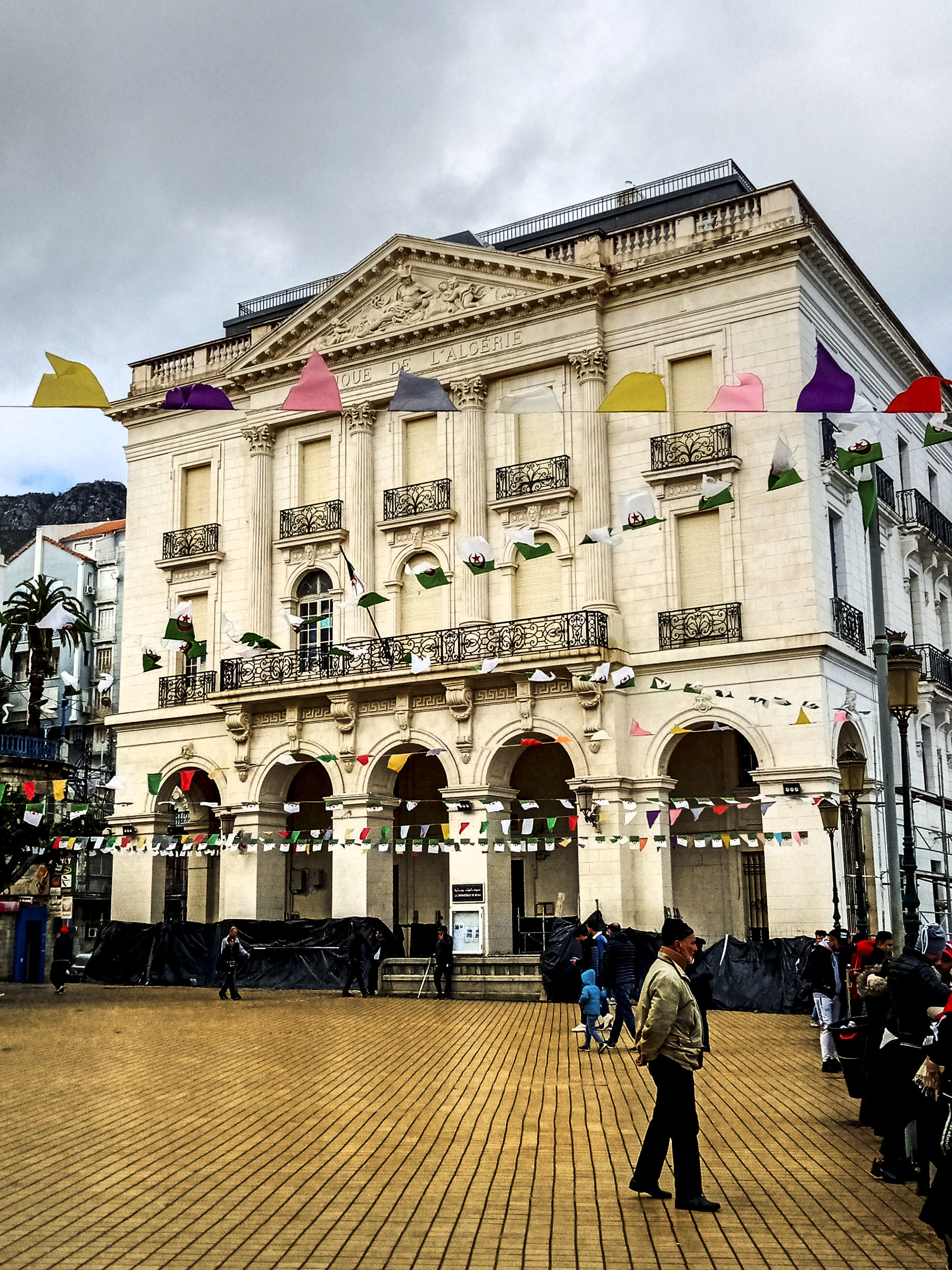
Former branch of the Banque de l'Algérie in Béjaïa

The Banque de l'Algérie was created by legislation of 4 August 1851 under the French Second Republic. From the start, it was granted the exclusive right to issue currency (French: privilège d'émission) in French Algeria, initially for a term of twenty years. The bank's head office was in Algiers, initially on rue de la Marine, then from 1868 in a purpose-built mansion on boulevard de l’Impératrice (later boulevard Carnot, now boulevard Ernesto Che Guevara) where the Bank of Algeria still keeps offices.

By legislation of 5 July 1900, the bank's head office was relocated from Algiers to Paris, in a property at 217, boulevard Saint-Germain, where it remained until its termination on 31 December 1963. The Bank of France became the property's owner and leased it to the Maison de l'Amérique latine, which moved into it in 1965.

The Banque de l’Algérie's issuance monopoly was extended to the French protectorate of Tunisia in 1904, following two decades of debates during which the Banque de Tunisie had unsuccessfully tried to secure the issuance license for itself. Following the establishment of the French protectorate in Morocco and in the context of World War I, the Banque de l'Algérie's notes became legal tender in French Morocco, together with Metropolitan French and traditional Moroccan currencies. Calls were made for monetary unification of French North Africa under the aegis of the Banque de l'Algérie, but the costly monetary competition eventually led to an agreement with the State Bank of Morocco that left the latter in charge of most monetary policy operations in the protectorate.

Following World War II, the Banque de l'Algérie was nationalized by a law of 17 May 1946. In January 1949, it was renamed the Banque de l'Algérie et de la Tunisie, but that change was reversed on 1 August 1958 following Tunisian independence and the establishment of the Central Bank of Tunisia.

== Leadership ==
The chief executive of the Banque de l'Algérie held the title of directeur-président, directeur, or directeur général-président, and from 1949, gouverneur.

- Édouard Lichtlin (1851-1859)
- Auguste Adolphe Villiers (1859-1875)
- Julien Ernest Chevallier (1875-1886)
- Félix Nelson Chiérico (1886-1897)
- Amédée Rihouet (1897-1898)
- Marc Lafon (1898-1906)
- Émile Moreau (1906-1926)
- Paul Ernest-Picard (1926-1934)
- Louis Escallier (1934-1946)
- Jacques Brunet (1946-1949)
- Marcel Flouret (1949-1952)
- Jean Watteau (1952-1962)
- Gilles Warnier de Wailly (1962-1963)

== See also ==
- Algerian franc
- Tunisian franc
- Bank of Java
- Dar al-Mal
- State Bank of Morocco
- Compagnie Algérienne
- List of banks in France
