= Association for the Defence of the Memory of Marshal Pétain =

- Association pour défendre la mémoire du maréchal Pétain
- Abbreviation: ADMP
- Formation: 6 November 1951
- Type: Nonprofit association
- Purpose: Defense and promotion of Marshal Philippe Pétain's memory and legacy
- Headquarters: 5 rue Larribe, Paris, France
- Region served: France
- President: Jacques Boncompain (since 2023)
- Website: https://marechalpetain.com

The Association for the Defence of the Memory of Marshal Pétain (French: Association pour défendre la mémoire du maréchal Pétain; ADMP) is a French association set up on 6 November 1951 under the patronage of general Maxime Weygand, its honorary president until his death in 1965.

== History ==
It was the successor to a "comité d'honneur", set up in 1948 by Marshal Philippe Pétain to campaign for his release from prison and quickly banned. This group was presided over by the historian Louis Madelin. The new group was established in 1951 following Petain's death and was effectively led by prominent Vichyist lawyer Jacques Isorni who was the driving force behind the group, with Weygand's presidency of the group largely symbolic. The group published a monthly journal, Le Marechal.

It found some short lived expression in the Union of Independent and Republican Nationals.

== Presidents ==
- Pierre Héring
- François Lehideux
- Jacques le Groignec (2000-2009)

== Sources ==
- Henry Rousso, "Le syndrome de Vichy, de 1944 à nos jours", Paris, Seuil, coll. "points histoire", 1990, p. 59-65
- Site of the ADMP
