= Richard Morefield =

American diplomat (1929–2010)

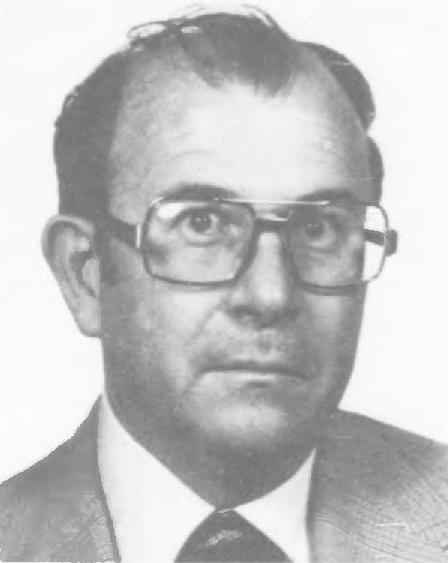
- Born: Richard Henry Morefield; September 9, 1929; Venice, California, U.S.
- Died: October 11, 2010 (aged 81); Raleigh, North Carolina, U.S.
- Education: University of California, Berkeley
- Occupation: Diplomat
- Known for: Held captive for 444 days in the Iran hostage crisis
- Spouse: Dorothea
- Children: 5

Richard Henry Morefield (September 9, 1929 – October 11, 2010) was an American diplomat who served in the United States Foreign Service. He was one of the 66 staff members at the American embassy in Tehran who were taken captive by a militant Islamist student group called the Muslim Student Followers of the Imam's Line on November 4, 1979, in what became known as the Iran hostage crisis. He was one of 52 Americans who were held as a hostage for 444 days, until negotiations for the remaining captives being held hostage were concluded with the signing of the Algiers Accords on January 19, 1981, with their release coming the following day.

== Early life and education ==
Morefield was born on September 9, 1929, in Venice, California and grew up in San Diego, where he attended San Diego High School. His college background focused on history, earning his undergraduate degree in the subject in 1951 from the University of San Francisco. He served for two years in the United States Army, attaining the rank of first lieutenant and received his master's degree in 1954 from the University of California, Berkeley after completing his military service. He joined the United States Foreign Service in 1956.

== Iran hostage crisis ==
On November 4, 1979, Morefield was in the American embassy in Teheran, where he was serving as the United States consul general to Iran. After the embassy was surrounded by Islamist militant students, the building was taken over. He was able to send a group of five Americans away by car who were able to take refuge in the Canadian Embassy. Morefield was with a group of about two dozen employees who had tried to leave the embassy compound but were captured a few blocks away by a group of students and Revolutionary Guards. In all, 66 Americans were taken hostage with the group demanding that Mohammad Reza Pahlavi, the deposed Shah who had been allowed to enter the United States, be returned to Iran for trial. A group of 13 female and African-American hostages were released in the weeks after the seizure and a seriously ill hostage was released in July 1980, leaving Morefield among the 52 American captives who would ultimately be held for 444 days.

Morefield was one of a group of six Americans who was at first taken to a school in Tehran, where they were placed in a shower room and had rifles pointed at them, marking the first of three mock executions he would ultimately face. Returned to the embassy compound in December, Morefield was put in a windowless basement storage room that he had to share with eight other hostages, leaving him with only enough room to take two or three steps in any direction. He and his fellow hostages had little to do but play card games and checkers with each other. Morefield took up a regular exercise regimen, doing push ups, sit ups and jogging around his cubicle for an hour each day. He lost more than 30 pounds by the time he was released and joked that "if I'm smart, this might have added 10 years to my life".

After the Algeria Accords were signed on January 19, 1981, Morefield and the other captives were given medical examinations and were released the next day, placed on buses surrounded by crowds shouting "Bad, bad, America's bad" and leaving the country on an Algerian airplane. He called his wife after they landed in Germany and told her that "those people tried to break us", but that "we beat them". Morefield was reunited with his wife and children at Stewart International Airport on January 25. His wife recalled her disbelief that she was finally seeing her husband, saying "Until that moment, I really didn't believe it was over. Then, of course, I ran, too. We didn't say anything for several minutes".

== After release from Iran ==
Morefield was assigned to head the State Department's Office of Caribbean Affairs and was assigned to Mexico where he served as consul general in Guadalajara and as the economic counselor in the American Embassy in Mexico City, his final posting.

Amid reports in 2005 that newly elected President of Iran Mahmoud Ahmadinejad had been one of the student radicals involved in the embassy takeover, Morefield said he didn't recognize him as "I was not one of those on which they spent a lot of time". Years after his release he held no grudge against the people of Iran, telling an interviewer from the BBC in 2006 that "I cannot equate what I know of Iran and its culture with the militant students who held me for 444 days" calling the country "a society with a lot of different groups which can contribute to a new modern Iran if they're given the chance".

Morefield died at age 81 on October 11, 2010, in Raleigh, North Carolina due to pneumonia. He was survived by his wife, Dorothea, as well as by a daughter and four sons. His son Rick had been killed in 1976 by a gunman during a robbery of a Virginia restaurant. Morefield recalled that the experience of dealing with the death of his son had given him greater strength to make it through the hostage crisis.

== See also ==
- List of kidnappings
