= Iran hostage crisis =

Occupation of Tehran's U.S. embassy (1979–1981)

- Part of the aftermath of the Iranian Revolution
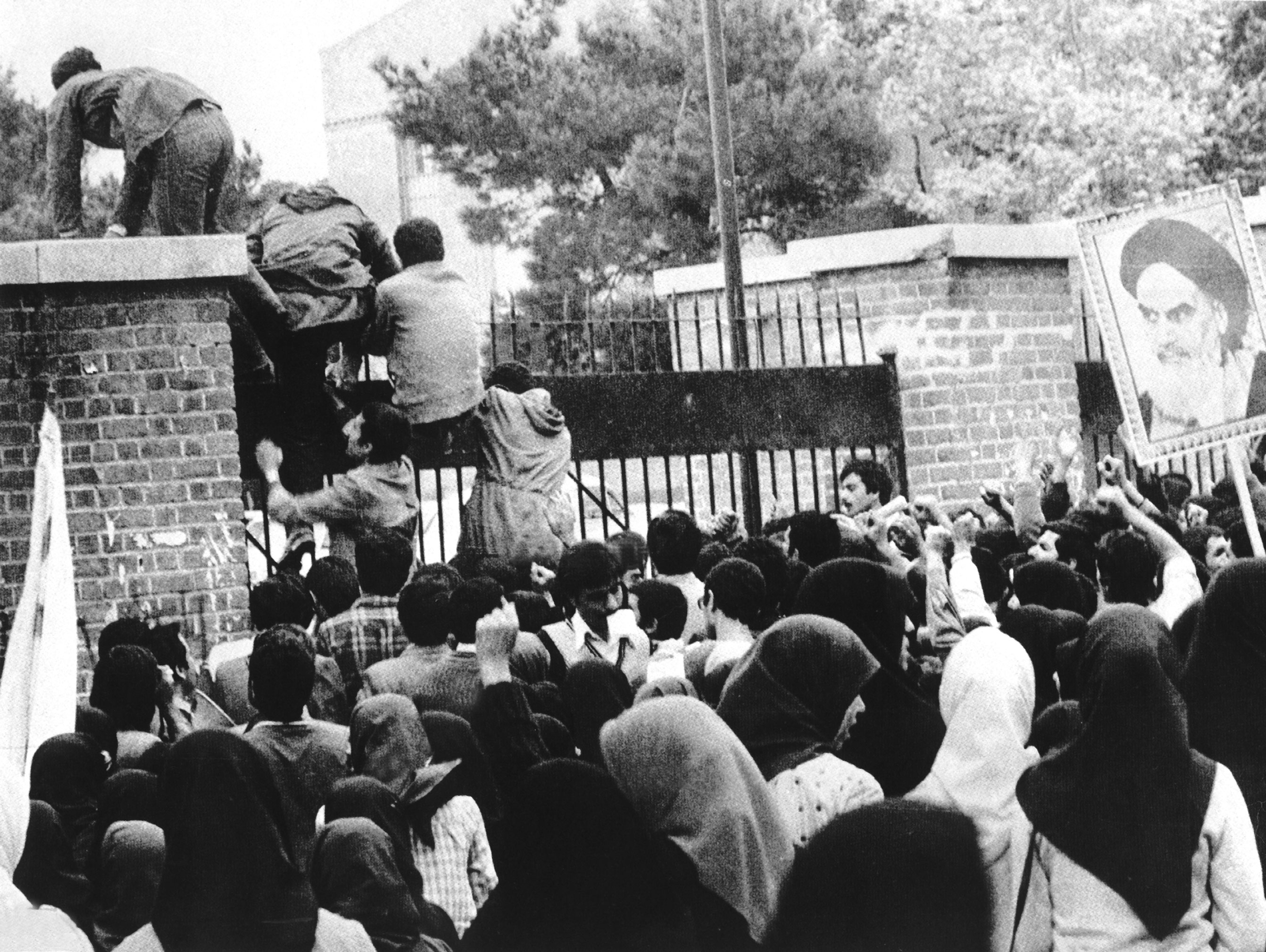
- Iranian students storming the Embassy of the United States in Tehran on November 4, 1979
Date	November 4, 1979 – January 20, 1981 (444 days)
Location	Tehran, Iran 35.708°N 51.424°E
Result	Signing of the Algiers Accords on January 19, 1981: Iran releases all remaining hostages following Reagan's inauguration on January 20, 1981; Successful Canadian operation rescues six hostages on January 27, 1980; International sanctions against Iran, led by the United States, beginning on November 14, 1979 lifted

Belligerents
Iran: First Interim Government (1979); Second Interim Government (1979–1980); Muslim Student Followers of the Imam's Line with support from Ruhollah Khomeini	United States; Canada

Commanders and leaders
Ruhollah Khomeini; Mehdi Bazargan (resigned); Mohammad Mousavi Khoeiniha	Jimmy Carter; Cyrus Vance (until April 28, 1980); Edmund Muskie (from May 8, 1980); Warren Christopher; James B. Vaught; Joe Clark; Flora MacDonald
- Casualties: Eight American soldiers and one Iranian civilian killed during Operation Eagle Claw on April 24–25, 1980
- Location within Iran

The Iran hostage crisis (Persian: بحران گروگانگیری سفارت آمریکا) began on November 4, 1979, when 66 Americans, including diplomats and other civilian personnel, were taken hostage at the Embassy of the United States in Tehran, with 52 of them being held until the end of the crisis on January 20, 1981. The incident occurred after the Muslim Student Followers of the Imam's Line stormed and occupied the building in the months following the Iranian Revolution. With support from Ruhollah Khomeini, who had led the Iranian Revolution and would eventually establish the present-day Islamic Republic of Iran, the hostage-takers demanded that the United States extradite Iranian king Mohammad Reza Pahlavi, who had been granted asylum by the Carter administration for cancer treatment. Notable among the assailants were Hossein Dehghan (future Minister of Defense of Iran), Mohammad Ali Jafari (future Commander-in-Chief of the Islamic Revolutionary Guard Corps), and Mohammad Bagheri (future Chief of the General Staff of the Iranian Armed Forces). The hostage crisis contributed to a dramatic decline in Iran–United States relations. After 444 days, it came to an end with the signing of the Algiers Accords between the Iranian and American governments; Pahlavi had died in Cairo, Egypt, on July 27, 1980.

The American magazine Time described the Iran hostage crisis as an entanglement of vengeance and mutual incomprehension. American president Jimmy Carter called the hostage-taking an act of "blackmail" and the hostages "victims of terrorism and anarchy." Among proponents of the Iranian Revolution, it was seen as an act against perceived attempts by the United States to undermine the uprising against Iran's king, who had been accused of committing numerous human rights abuses against Iranian dissidents through his Bureau for Intelligence and Security of the State. The Carter administration's refusal to extradite Pahlavi was cited by the hostage-takers as proof of complicity on the part of the United States, which, in turn, denounced the Iranians' hostage-taking as an egregious violation of the principles of international law, such as the Vienna Convention, under which diplomats and diplomatic compounds are to be granted immunity from coercion and harassment.

Six American diplomats who had evaded capture were rescued by the "Canadian Caper" on January 27, 1980. As Iran hostage crisis negotiations dragged out and did not secure the release of the remaining hostages, Carter approved Operation Eagle Claw on April 24, 1980. The effort failed, however, resulting in the death of one Iranian civilian and eight American soldiers, prompting Secretary of State Cyrus Vance to resign from his position. By September 1980, the beginning of the Iraqi invasion of Iran spurred the Iranian government to negotiate with the United States as part of an initiative mediated by Algeria.

Political analysts cited the standoff as a major factor in the downfall of Carter's presidency, culminating in his landslide loss in the 1980 presidential election. The hostages were formally released into American custody one day after the Algiers Accords were signed, just minutes following the first inauguration of Ronald Reagan. In Iran, the crisis strengthened the prestige of Khomeini and the political power of theocrats who opposed normalization with the Western world. Since then, the United States has enforced international sanctions against Iran with regard to the latter's nuclear ambitions and human rights record, further weakening ties between the two countries.

== Background ==
=== 1953 Iranian coup d'état ===
During the Second World War, the British and the Soviet governments invaded and occupied Iran, forcing the first Pahlavi monarch, Reza Shah Pahlavi, to abdicate in favor of his eldest son, Mohammad Reza Pahlavi. The two nations claimed that they acted pre-emptively in order to stop Reza Shah from aligning his petroleum-rich country with Nazi Germany. However, the Shah's declaration of neutrality, and his refusal to allow Iranian territory to be used to train or supply Soviet troops, were probably the real reasons for the invasion of Iran.

The United States did not participate in the invasion but it secured Iran's independence after the war ended by applying intense diplomatic pressure on the Soviet Union which forced it to withdraw from Iran in 1946.

By the 1950s, Mohammad Reza Pahlavi was engaged in a power struggle with Iran's prime minister, Mohammad Mosaddegh, an immediate descendant of the preceding Qajar dynasty. Mosaddegh led a general strike, demanding an increased share of the nation's petroleum revenue from the Anglo-Iranian Oil Company which was operating in Iran. The UK retaliated by reducing the amount of revenue which the Iranian government received. In 1953, the CIA and MI6 helped Iranian royalists depose Mosaddegh in a military coup d'état codenamed Operation Ajax, allowing the Shah to extend his power. For the next two decades the Shah reigned as an absolute monarch. "Disloyal" elements within the state were purged. The U.S. continued to support the Shah after the coup, with the CIA training the Iranian secret police. In the subsequent decades of the Cold War, various economic, cultural, and political issues united Iranian opposition against the Shah and led to his eventual overthrow.

=== The Carter administration and the Shah ===
Months before the Iranian Revolution, on New Year's Eve 1977, U.S. President Jimmy Carter further angered anti-Shah Iranians with a televised toast to Pahlavi at a state dinner in Tehran, saluting the Shah's character. After the revolution commenced in February 1979 with the return of the Ayatollah Khomeini from exile, the American Embassy was occupied, and its staff held hostage briefly. Rocks and bullets had broken so many of the embassy's front-facing windows that they were replaced with bulletproof glass. The embassy's staff was reduced to just over 60 from a high of nearly one thousand earlier in the decade.

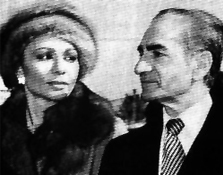
Iran attempted to use the occupation to provide leverage in its demand for the return of the Shah to stand trial in Iran

The Carter administration tried to mitigate anti-American feeling by promoting a new relationship with the de facto Iranian government and continuing military cooperation in the hope that the situation would stabilize. However, on October 22, 1979, the United States permitted the Shah, who had lymphoma, to enter New York Hospital-Cornell Medical Center for medical treatment. The State Department had discouraged this decision, understanding the political delicacy. But in response to pressure from influential figures including former Secretary of State Henry Kissinger and Council on Foreign Relations Chairman David Rockefeller, the Carter administration decided to grant it.

The Shah's admission to the United States intensified Iranian revolutionaries' anti-Americanism and spawned rumors of another U.S.–backed coup that would re-install him. Khomeini, who had been exiled by the Shah for 15 years, heightened the rhetoric against the "Great Satan", as he called the U.S., talking of "evidence of American plotting." In addition to ending what they believed was American sabotage of the revolution, the hostage takers hoped to depose the provisional revolutionary government of Prime Minister Mehdi Bazargan, which they believed was plotting to normalize relations with the U.S. and extinguish Islamic revolutionary order in Iran. The occupation of the embassy on November 4, 1979, was also intended as leverage to demand the return of the Shah to stand trial in Iran in exchange for the hostages.

== Prelude ==
=== First embassy assault ===
On the morning of February 14, 1979, the Organization of Iranian People's Fedai Guerrillas stormed the U.S. Embassy in Tehran and took a Marine named Kenneth Kraus hostage. Ambassador William H. Sullivan surrendered the embassy to save lives, and with the assistance of Iranian Foreign Minister Ebrahim Yazdi, returned the embassy to U.S. hands within three hours. Kraus was injured in the attack, kidnapped by the militants, tortured, tried, and convicted of murder. He was to be executed, but President Carter and Sullivan secured his release within six days. This incident became known as the Valentine's Day Open House.

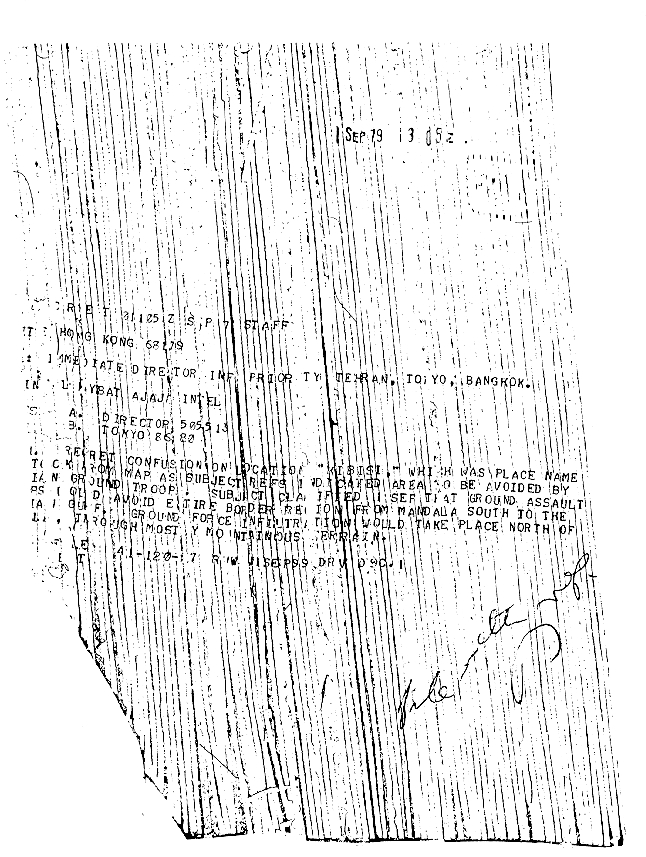
Anticipating the takeover of the embassy, the Americans tried to destroy classified documents in a furnace. The furnace malfunctioned and the staff was forced to use cheap paper shredders. Skilled carpet weavers were later employed to reconstruct the documents.

=== Second embassy assault ===
The next attempt to seize the American Embassy was planned for September 1979 by Ebrahim Asgharzadeh, a student at the time. He consulted with the heads of the Islamic associations of Tehran's main universities, including the University of Tehran, Sharif University of Technology, Amirkabir University of Technology (Polytechnic of Tehran), and Iran University of Science and Technology. They named their group Muslim Student Followers of the Imam's Line.

Asgharzadeh later said there were five students at the first meeting, two of whom wanted to target the Soviet Embassy because the USSR was "a Marxist and anti-God regime". Two others, Mohsen Mirdamadi and Habibolah Bitaraf, supported Asgharzadeh's chosen target, the United States. "Our aim was to object against the American government by going to their embassy and occupying it for several hours," Asgharzadeh said. "Announcing our objections from within the occupied compound would carry our message to the world in a much more firm and effective way." Mirdamadi told an interviewer, "We intended to detain the diplomats for a few days, maybe one week, but no more." Masoumeh Ebtekar, the spokeswoman for the Iranian students during the crisis, said that those who rejected Asgharzadeh's plan did not participate in the subsequent events.

The students observed the procedures of the Marine Security Guards from nearby rooftops overlooking the embassy. They also drew on their experiences from the recent revolution, during which the U.S. Embassy grounds were briefly occupied. They enlisted the support of police officers in charge of guarding the embassy and of the Islamic Revolutionary Guards.

Asgharzadeh and other senior organizers (including Abbas Abdi and Mohsen Mirdammadi, now a professor of political science) rejected claims that Ayatollah Ruhollah Khomeini had orchestrated or instructed them to carry out the attack. The students had wanted to inform him, but according to the author Mark Bowden, Ayatollah Mohammad Mousavi Khoeiniha persuaded them not to do so. Khoeiniha feared that the government would use the police to expel the students as they had the occupiers in February. The provisional government had been appointed by Khomeini, so Khomeini was likely to go along with the government's request to restore order. On the other hand, Khoeiniha knew that if Khomeini first saw that the occupiers were faithful supporters of him (unlike the leftists in the first occupation) and that large numbers of pious Muslims had gathered outside the embassy to show their support for the takeover, it would be "very hard, perhaps even impossible," for him to oppose the takeover, and this would paralyze the Bazargan administration, which Khoeiniha and the students wanted to eliminate.

Supporters of the takeover stated that their motivation was fear of another American-backed coup against their popular revolution.

=== Third embassy assault and seizure of hostages ===
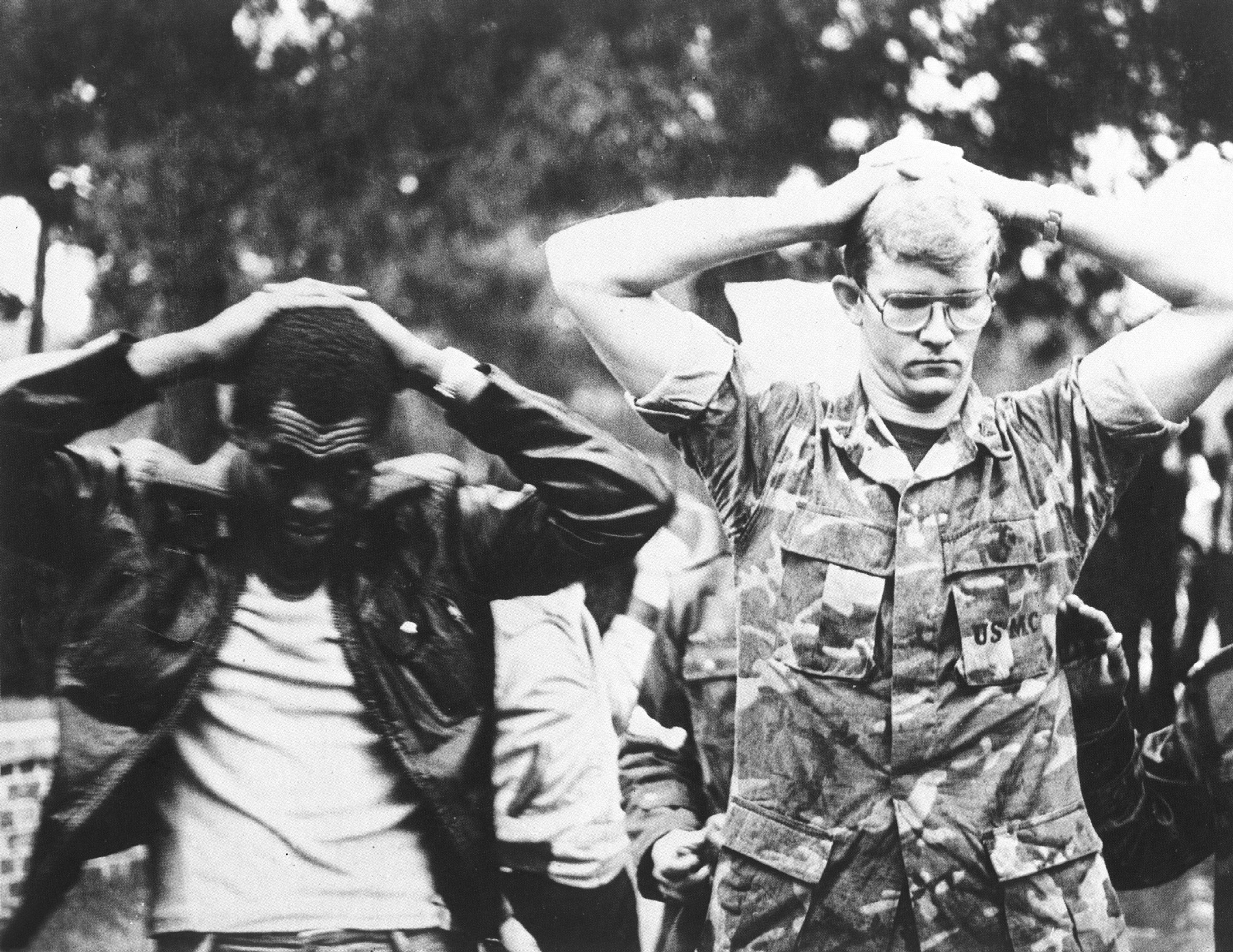
Two American hostages during the siege of the U.S. Embassy.

On November 4, 1979, one of the demonstrations organized by Iranian student unions loyal to Khomeini erupted into an all-out conflict right outside the walled compound housing the U.S. Embassy.

At about 6:30 a.m., the ringleaders gathered between three hundred and five hundred selected students and briefed them on the battle plan. A female student was given a pair of metal cutters to break the chains locking the embassy's gates and hid them beneath her chador.

At first, the students planned a symbolic occupation, in which they would release statements to the press and leave when government security forces came to restore order. This was reflected in placards saying: "Don't be afraid. We just want to sit in." When the embassy guards brandished firearms, the protesters retreated, with one telling the Americans, "We don't mean any harm." But as it became clear that the guards would not use deadly force and that a large, angry crowd had gathered outside the compound to cheer the occupiers and jeer the hostages, the plan changed. According to one embassy staff member, buses full of demonstrators began to appear outside the embassy shortly after the Muslim Student Followers of the Imam's Line broke through the gates.

As Khomeini's followers had hoped, Khomeini supported the takeover. According to Foreign Minister Yazdi, when he went to Qom to tell Khomeini about it, Khomeini told him to "go and kick them out." But later that evening, back in Tehran, Yazdi heard on the radio that Khomeini had issued a statement supporting the seizure, calling it "the second revolution" and the embassy an "American spy den in Tehran."

A two-minute clip from a newsreel regarding the hostage crisis (1980)

The Marines and embassy staff were blindfolded by the occupiers and then paraded in front of assembled photographers. In the first couple of days, many of the embassy workers who had sneaked out of the compound or had not been there at the time of the takeover were rounded up by Islamists and returned as hostages. Six American diplomats managed to avoid capture and went into hiding until one of the diplomats Robert Anders called his Canadian counterpart John Sheardown seeking help. The group of six stayed in the personal homes of two Canadian diplomats. Two of the six stayed with Canadian Ambassador Kenneth Taylor, the other four staying with the Sheardown family for 79 days. In a joint covert operation known as the Canadian Caper, the Canadian government and the CIA managed to smuggle them out of Iran on January 28, 1980, using Canadian passports and a cover story that identified them as a film crew. Others went to the Swedish Embassy in Tehran for three months.

A State Department diplomatic cable of November 8, 1979, details "A Tentative, Incomplete List of U.S. Personnel Being Held in the Embassy Compound."

==== Motives and demands ====
The Muslim Student Followers of the Imam's Line demanded that Shah Mohammad Reza Pahlavi return to Iran for trial and execution. The U.S. maintained that the Shah—who was to die less than a year later, in July 1980—had come to America for medical attention. The group's other demands included that the U.S. government apologize for its interference in the internal affairs of Iran, including the overthrow of Prime Minister Mosaddegh in 1953, and that Iran's frozen assets in the United States be released.

Barry Rosen, the embassy's press attaché, was among the hostages. The man on the right holding the briefcase is alleged by some former hostages to be future President Mahmoud Ahmadinejad, although he, Iran's government, and the CIA deny this.

The initial plan was to hold the embassy for only a short time, but this changed after it became apparent how popular the takeover was and that Khomeini had given it his full support. Some attributed the decision not to release the hostages quickly to President Carter's failure to immediately deliver an ultimatum to Iran. His initial response was to appeal for the release of the hostages on humanitarian grounds and to share his hope for a strategic anti-communist alliance with the Ayatollah. As some of the student leaders had hoped, Iran's moderate prime minister, Bazargan, and his cabinet resigned under pressure just days after the takeover.

The duration of the hostages' captivity has also been attributed to internal Iranian revolutionary politics. As Ayatollah Khomeini told Iran's president:

This has united our people. Our opponents do not dare act against us. We can put the constitution to the people's vote without difficulty, and carry out presidential and parliamentary elections.

Various leftist student groups also supported the taking of hostages at the U.S. embassy. The embassy take-over was aimed at strengthening the new regime against liberal elements in the government, portraying the regime as a "revolutionary force" while winning over the major following that the People's Mojahedin of Iran had amongst students in Iran. According to scholar Daniel Pipes, writing in 1980, the Marxist-leaning leftists and the Islamists shared a common antipathy toward market-based reforms under the late Shah, and both subsumed individualism, including the unique identity of women, under conservative, though contrasting, visions of collectivism. Accordingly, both groups favored the Soviet Union over the United States in the early months of the Iranian Revolution. The Soviets, and possibly their allies Cuba, Libya, and East Germany, were suspected of providing indirect assistance to the participants in the takeover of the U.S. embassy in Tehran. The Palestine Liberation Organization under Yasser Arafat provided personnel, intelligence liaisons, funding, and training for Khomeini's forces before and after the revolution and was suspected of playing a role in the embassy crisis.

By embracing the hostage-taking under the slogan "America can't do a thing," Khomeini rallied support and deflected criticism of his controversial theocratic constitution, which was scheduled for a referendum vote in less than one month. The referendum was successful, and after the vote, both leftists and theocrats continued to use allegations of pro-Americanism to suppress their opponents: relatively moderate political forces that included the Iranian Freedom Movement, the National Front, Grand Ayatollah Mohammad Kazem Shariatmadari, and later President Abolhassan Banisadr. In particular, carefully selected diplomatic dispatches and reports discovered at the embassy and released by the hostage-takers led to the disempowerment and resignation of moderate figures such as Bazargan. The failed rescue attempt and the political danger of any move seen as accommodating America delayed a negotiated release of the hostages. After the crisis ended, leftists and theocrats turned on each other, with the stronger theocratic group annihilating the left.

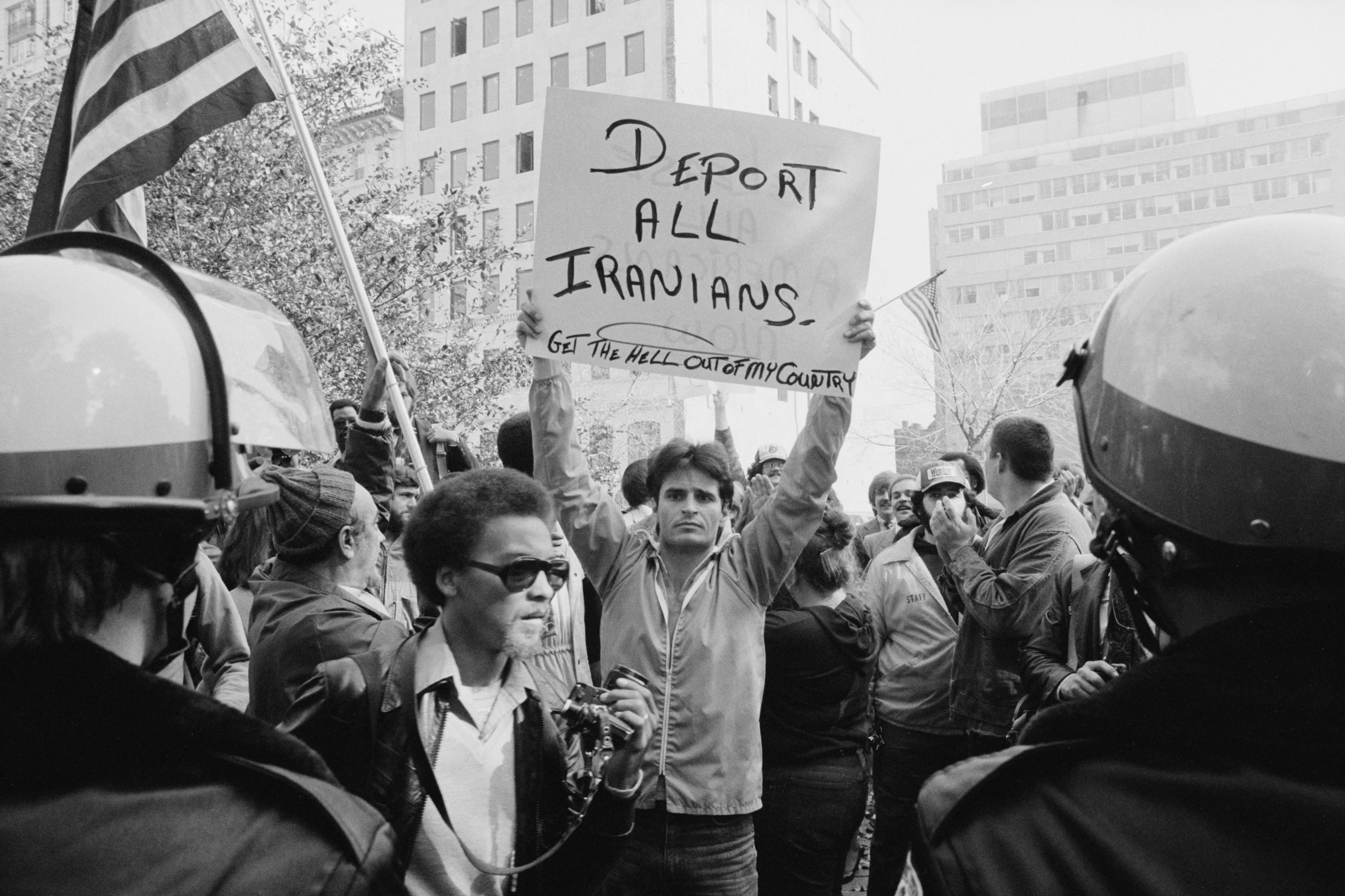
An anti-Iranian protest in Washington, D.C., in 1979. The front of the sign reads "Deport all Iranians" and "Get the hell out of my country", and the back reads "Release all Americans now".

==== Purported discovery of espionage documents ====
Revolutionary teams displayed secret documents purportedly taken from the embassy, sometimes painstakingly reconstructed after shredding, in order to buttress their statement that the United States was trying to destabilize the new regime with the assistance of Iranian moderates who were in league with the U.S. The documents – including telegrams, correspondence, and reports from the U.S. State Department and the CIA – were published in a series of books which were titled Documents from the U.S. Espionage Den (Persian: اسناد لانه جاسوسی امریكا). According to a 1997 Federation of American Scientists bulletin, by 1995, 77 volumes of Documents from the U.S. Espionage Den had been published. Many of these volumes are now available online.

=== 1979 assault on the American embassy in Pakistan ===
On November 21, 1979, the Embassy of the United States in Islamabad was attacked and burned down by a crowd of over 1,000 Pakistani rioters who had been inspired by the Iran hostage crisis. Most of the crowd consisted of students from Quaid-i-Azam University and received support from Muslim clerics and the political party Jamaat-e-Islami Pakistan. The incident led to the deaths of four embassy personnel (two Americans, two Pakistanis) and two rioters. Iranian leader Ruhollah Khomeini praised the attack; Khomeini played a role in inciting the riots after falsely claiming over a radio broadcast that the United States and Israel had orchestrated the Grand Mosque seizure by radical Muslim militants in Saudi Arabia. Pakistan's erstwhile president Muhammad Zia-ul-Haq condemned the burning of the embassy and eventually deployed the Pakistan Army to suppress the rioters.

== The 444-day crisis ==
=== Living conditions of the hostages ===
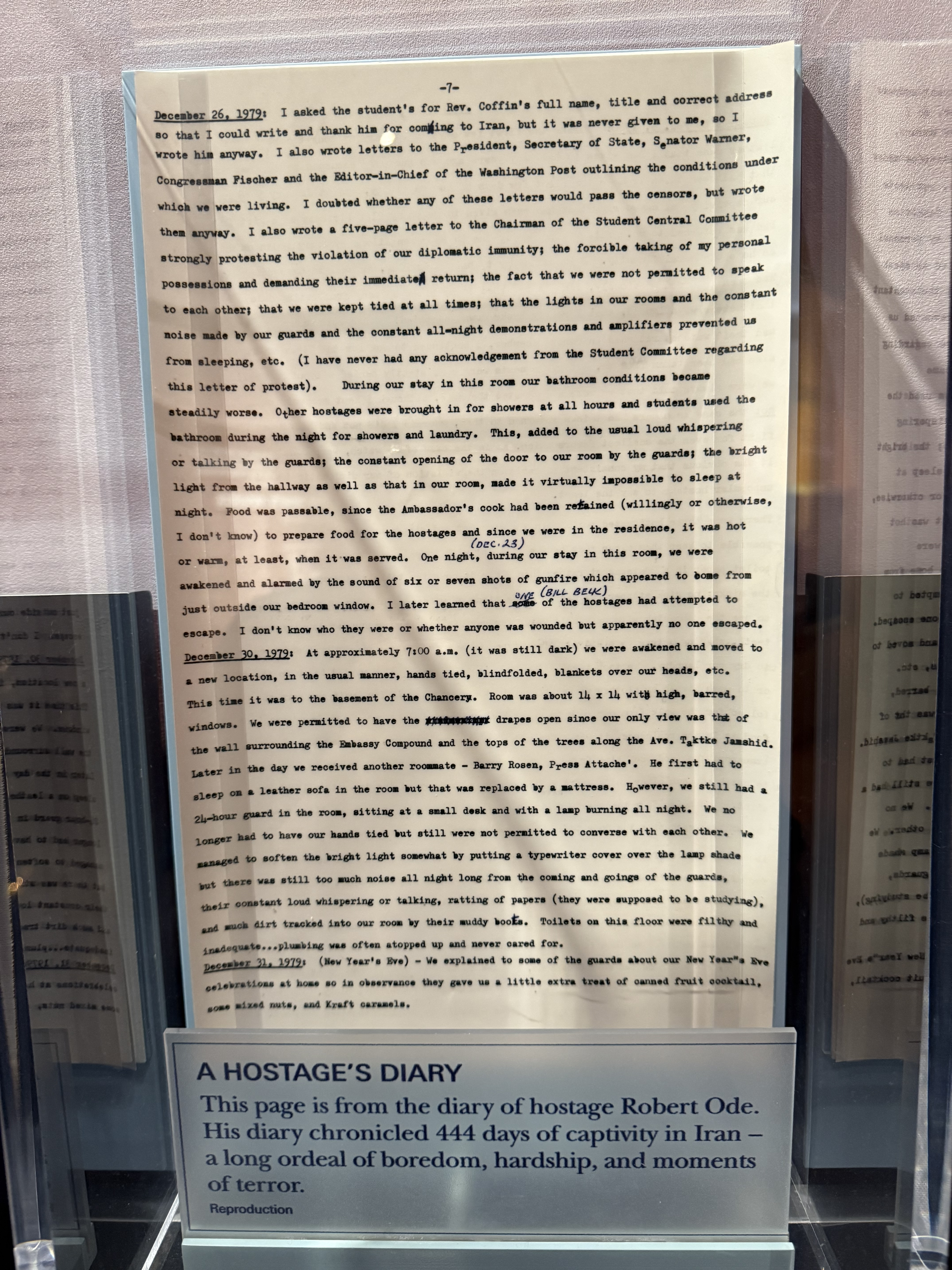
Page reproduction of Robert Ode's diary during 444-day crisis at Jimmy Carter Library and Museum

The hostage-takers, declaring their solidarity with other "oppressed minorities" and declaring their respect for "the special place of women in Islam," released one woman and two African Americans on November 19. Before release, these hostages were required by their captors to hold a press conference in which Kathy Gross and William Quarles praised the revolution's aims, but four further women and six African-Americans were released the following day. According to the then United States Ambassador to Lebanon, John Gunther Dean, the 13 hostages were released with the assistance of the Palestine Liberation Organization, after Yassir Arafat and Abu Jihad personally traveled to Tehran to secure a concession. The only African-American hostage not released that month was Charles A. Jones, Jr. One more hostage, a white man named Richard Queen, was released in July 1980 after he became seriously ill with what was later diagnosed as multiple sclerosis. The remaining 52 hostages were held until January 1981, up to 444 days of captivity.

The hostages were initially held at the embassy, but after the takers took the cue from the failed rescue mission, the detainees were scattered around Iran in order to make a single rescue attempt impossible. Three high-level officials – Bruce Laingen, Victor L. Tomseth, and Mike Howland – were at the Foreign Ministry at the time of the takeover. They stayed there for several months, sleeping in the ministry's formal dining room and washing their socks and underwear in the bathroom. At first, they were treated as diplomats, but after the provisional government fell, the treatment of them deteriorated. By March, the doors to their living space were kept "chained and padlocked."

By midsummer 1980, the Iranians had moved the hostages to prisons in Tehran to prevent escapes or rescue attempts and to improve the logistics of guard shifts and food deliveries. The final holding area, from November 1980 until their release, was the Teymur Bakhtiar mansion in Tehran, where the hostages were finally given tubs, showers, and hot and cold running water. Several foreign diplomats and ambassadors – including the Canadian ambassador Ken Taylor – visited the hostages over the course of the crisis and relayed information back to the U.S. government, including dispatches from Laingen.

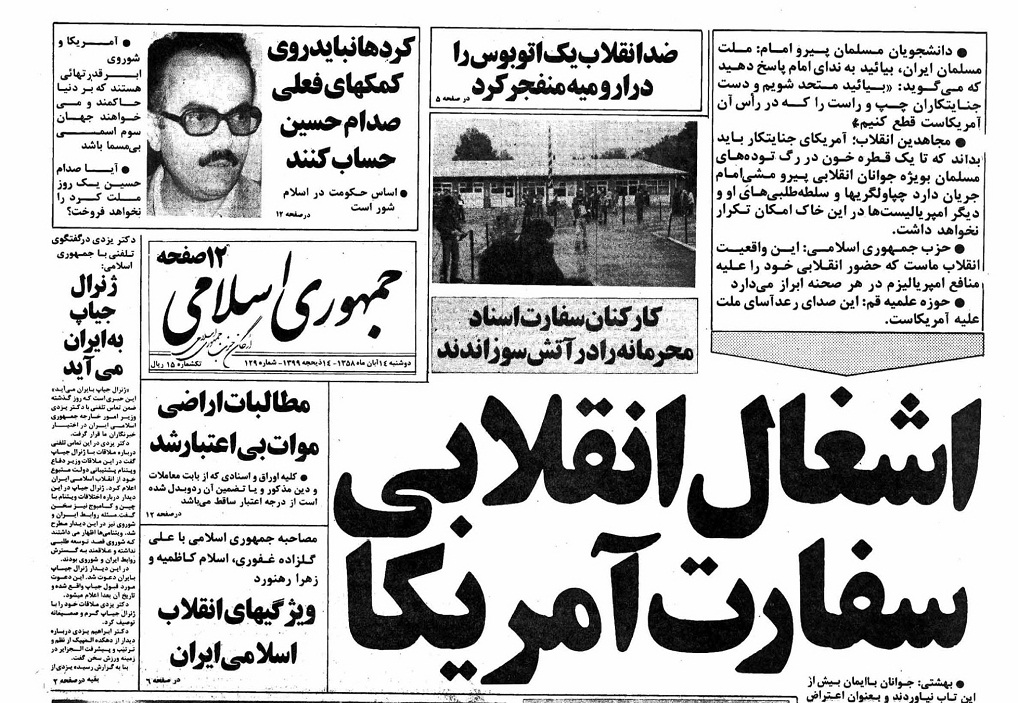
A headline in an Islamic Republican newspaper on November 5, 1979, read "Revolutionary occupation of U.S. embassy".

Iranian propaganda stated that the hostages were "guests" and it also stated that they were being treated with respect. Asgharzadeh, the leader of the students, described the original plan as a nonviolent and symbolic action in which the students would use their "gentle and respectful treatment" of the hostages to dramatize the offended sovereignty and dignity of Iran to the entire world. In America, an Iranian chargé d'affaires, Ali Agha, stormed out of a meeting with an American official, exclaiming: "We are not mistreating the hostages. They are being very well taken care of in Tehran. They are our guests."

The actual treatment of the hostages was far different. They described beatings, theft, and fear of bodily harm. Two of them, William Belk and Kathryn Koob, recalled being paraded blindfolded before an angry, chanting crowd outside the embassy. Others reported having their hands bound "day and night" for days or even weeks, long periods of solitary confinement, and months of being forbidden to speak to one another or to stand, walk, or leave their space unless they were going to the bathroom. All of the hostages "were threatened repeatedly with execution, and took it seriously." The hostage-takers played Russian roulette with their victims.

One hostage, Michael Metrinko, was kept in solitary confinement for several months. On two occasions, when he expressed his opinion of Ayatollah Khomeini, he was severely punished. The first time, he was kept in handcuffs for two weeks, and the second time, he was beaten and kept alone in a freezing cell for two weeks.

Another hostage, U.S. Army medic Donald Hohman, went on a hunger strike for several weeks, and two hostages attempted suicide. Steve Lauterbach broke a water glass and slashed his wrists after being locked in a dark basement room with his hands tightly bound. He was found and rushed to the hospital by guards. Jerry Miele, a CIA communications technician, smashed his head into the corner of a door, knocking himself unconscious and cutting a deep gash. "Naturally withdrawn" and looking "ill, old, tired, and vulnerable," Miele had become the butt of his guards' jokes, and they had rigged up a mock electric chair to emphasize the fate that awaited him. His fellow hostages applied first aid and raised the alarm, and he was taken to a hospital after a long delay which was caused by the guards.

Other hostages described threats to boil their feet in oil (Alan B. Golacinski), cut their eyes out (Rick Kupke), or kidnap and kill a disabled son in America and "start sending pieces of him to your wife" (David Roeder).

Four hostages tried to escape, and all of them were punished with stretches of solitary confinement when their escape attempts were discovered.

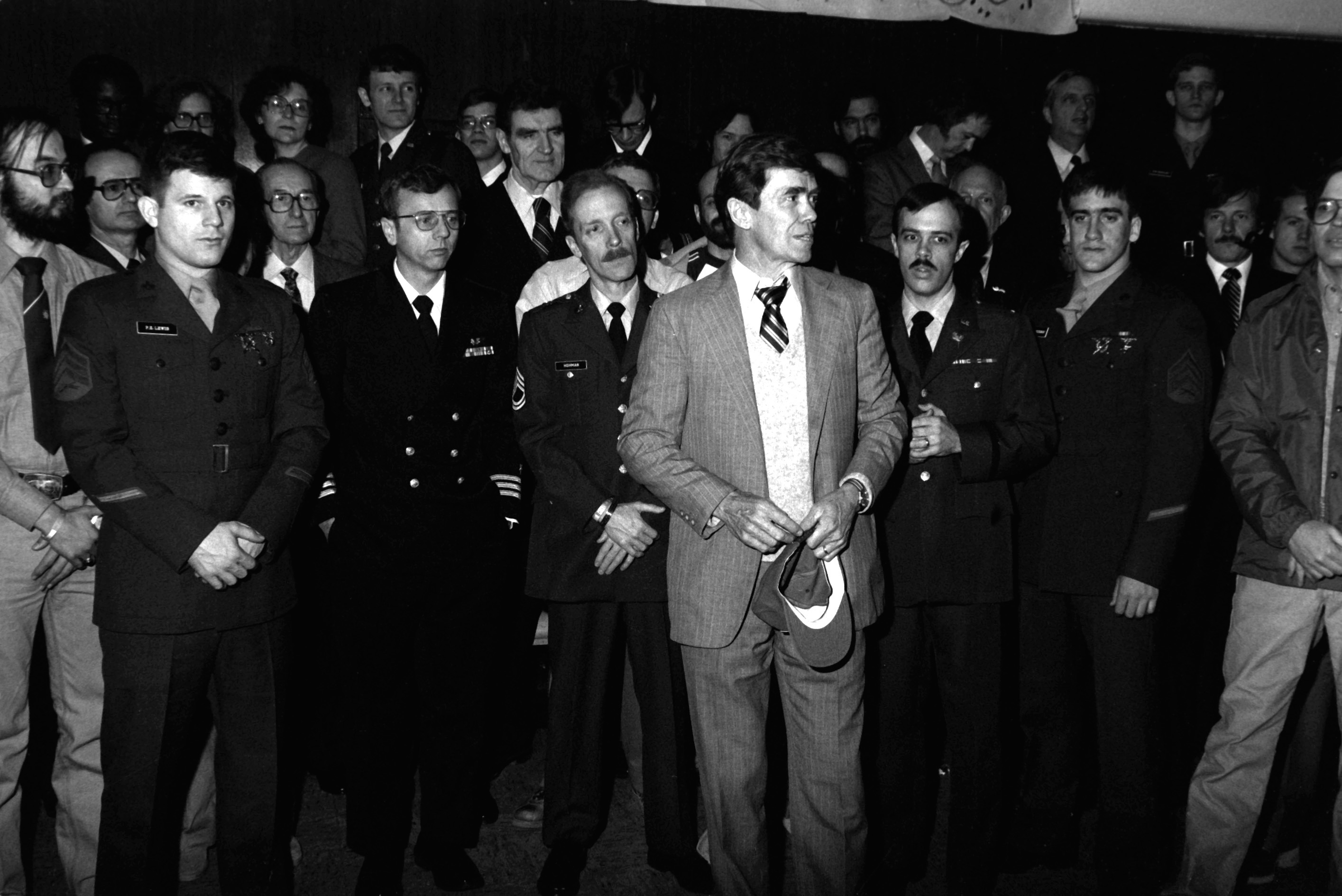
A group photograph of the fifty-two hostages in a Wiesbaden hospital where they spent a few days after their release.

Queen, the hostage who was sent home because of his multiple sclerosis, first developed dizziness and numbness in his left arm six months before his release. At first, the Iranians misdiagnosed his symptoms as a reaction to drafts of cold air. When warmer confinement did not help, he was told that it was "nothing" because the symptoms would disappear soon. Over the months, the numbness spread to his right side, and the dizziness worsened until he "was literally flat on his back, unable to move without growing dizzy and throwing up."

The cruelty of the Iranian prison guards became "a form of slow torture." The guards often withheld mail – telling one hostage, Charles W. Scott, "I don't see anything for you, Mr. Scott. Are you sure your wife has not found another man?" – and the hostages' possessions went missing.

As the hostages were taken to the aircraft that would fly them out of Tehran, they were led through a gauntlet of students forming parallel lines and shouting, "Marg bar Amrika" ("death to America"). When the pilot announced that they were out of Iran, the "freed hostages went wild with happiness. Shouting, cheering, crying, clapping, falling into one another's arms."

=== Impact in the United States ===
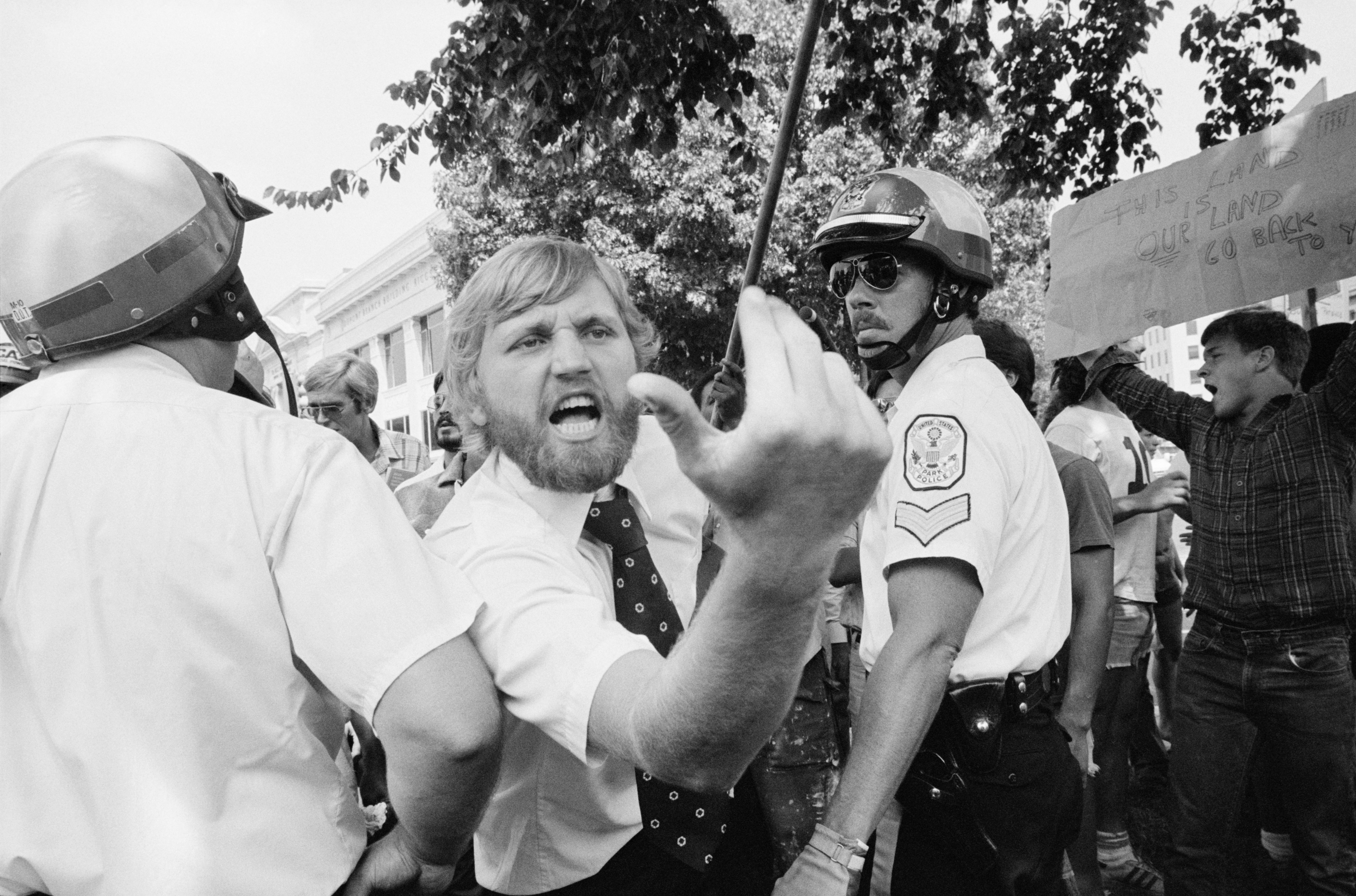
A heckler in Washington, D.C. leans across a police line toward a demonstration of Iranians in August 1980.

In the United States, the hostage crisis created "a surge of patriotism" and left "the American people more united than they have been on any issue in two decades." The hostage-taking was seen "not just as a diplomatic affront," as the editorial board of The New York Times noted, but as a "declaration of war on diplomacy itself." Television news gave daily updates. In January 1980, the CBS Evening News anchor Walter Cronkite began ending each show by saying how many days the hostages had been captive. President Carter applied economic and diplomatic pressure: Oil imports from Iran were ended on November 12, 1979, and with Executive Order 12170, around US$8 billion of Iranian assets in the United States were frozen by the Office of Foreign Assets Control on November 14.

During the weeks leading up to Christmas in 1979, high school students made cards that were delivered to the hostages. Community groups across the country did the same, resulting in bales of Christmas cards. The National Christmas Tree was left dark except for the top star.

At the time, two Trenton, N.J., newspapers – The Trenton Times and The Trentonian and perhaps others around the country – printed full-page color American flags in their newspapers for readers to cut out and place in the front windows of their homes as support for the hostages until they were brought home safely.

Some Iranian Americans reported a backlash against them develop in the United States. According to activist Maziar Bahari, an anonymous friend told him, "I had to hide my Iranian identity not to get beaten up, even at university."

According to Bowden, a pattern emerged in President Carter's attempts to negotiate the hostages' release: "Carter would latch on to a deal proffered by a top Iranian official and grant minor but humiliating concessions, only to have it scotched at the last minute by Khomeini."

=== Canadian rescue operation ===
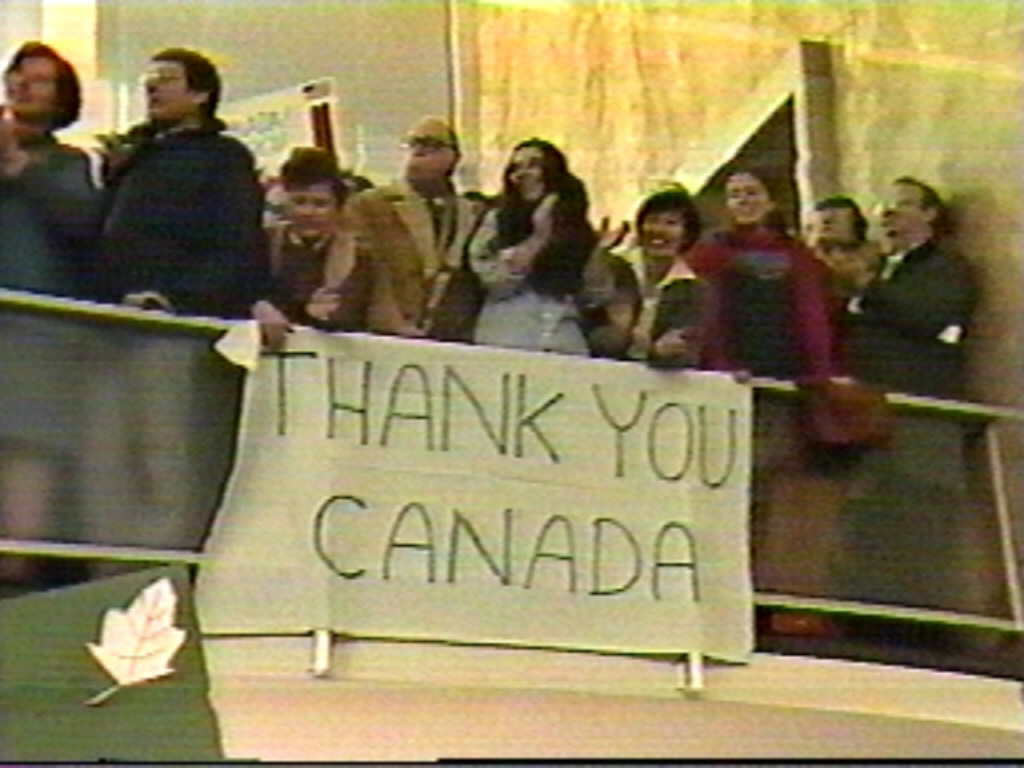
Americans expressed gratitude for Canadian efforts to rescue American diplomats during the hostage crisis.

On the day the hostages were seized, six American diplomats evaded capture and remained in hiding at the home of the Canadian diplomat John Sheardown, under the protection of the Canadian ambassador, Ken Taylor. In late 1979, the government of Prime Minister Joe Clark secretly issued an Order in Council allowing Canadian passports to be issued to some American citizens so that they could escape. In cooperation with the CIA, which used the cover story of a film project, two CIA agents and the six American diplomats boarded a Swissair flight to Zürich, Switzerland, on January 28, 1980. Their rescue from Iran, known as the Canadian Caper, was fictionalized in the 1981 film Escape from Iran: The Canadian Caper and the 2012 film Argo.

=== American rescue operations ===
==== Failed first attempt ====
Cyrus Vance, the United States Secretary of State, had argued against the push by Zbigniew Brzezinski, the National Security Advisor, for a military solution to the crisis. Vance, struggling with gout, went to Florida on Thursday, April 10, 1980, for a long weekend. On Friday Brzezinski held a newly scheduled meeting of the National Security Council where the president authorized Operation Eagle Claw, a military expedition into Tehran to rescue the hostages. Deputy Secretary Warren Christopher, who attended the meeting in Vance's place, did not inform Vance. Furious, Vance handed in his resignation on principle, calling Brzezinski "evil."

Late in the afternoon of April 24, 1980, eight RH‑53D helicopters flew from the aircraft carrier USS Nimitz to a remote road serving as an airstrip in the Great Salt Desert of Eastern Iran, near Tabas. They encountered severe dust storms that disabled two of the helicopters, which were traveling in complete radio silence. Early the next morning, the remaining six helicopters met up with several waiting Lockheed C-130 Hercules transport aircraft at a landing site and refueling area designated "Desert One".

At this point, a third helicopter was found to be unserviceable, bringing the total below the six deemed vital for the mission. The commander of the operation, Col. Charles Alvin Beckwith, recommended that the mission be aborted, and his recommendation was approved by President Carter. As the helicopters repositioned themselves for refueling, one ran into a C‑130 tanker aircraft and crashed, killing eight U.S. servicemen and injuring several more.

Two hours into the flight, the crew of helicopter No. 6 saw a warning light indicating that a main rotor might be cracked. They landed in the desert, confirmed visually that a crack had started to develop, and stopped flying in accordance with normal operating procedure. Helicopter No. 8 landed to pick up the crew of No. 6, and abandoned No. 6 in the desert without destroying it. The report by Holloway's group pointed out that a cracked helicopter blade could have been used to continue the mission and that its likelihood of catastrophic failure would have been low for many hours, especially at lower flying speeds. The report found that the pilot of No. 6 would have continued the mission if instructed to do so.

When the helicopters encountered two dust storms along the way to the refueling point, the second more severe than the first, the pilot of No. 5 turned back because the mine-laying helicopters were not equipped with terrain-following radar. The report found that the pilot could have continued to the refueling point if he had been told that better weather awaited him there, but because of the command for radio silence, he did not ask about the conditions ahead. The report also concluded that "there were ways to pass the information" between the refueling station and the helicopter force "that would have small likelihood of compromising the mission" – in other words, that the ban on communication had not been necessary at this stage.

Helicopter No. 2 experienced a partial hydraulic system failure but was able to fly on for four hours to the refueling location. There, an inspection showed that a hydraulic fluid leak had damaged a pump and that the helicopter could not be flown safely, nor repaired in time to continue the mission. Six helicopters were thought to be the absolute minimum required for the rescue mission, so with the force reduced to five, the local commander radioed his intention to abort. This request was passed through military channels to President Carter, who agreed.

In May 1980, the Joint Chiefs of Staff commissioned a Special Operations review group of six senior military officers, led by Adm. James L. Holloway III, to thoroughly examine all aspects of the rescue attempt. The group identified 23 issues that were significant in the failure of the mission, 11 of which it deemed major. The overriding issue was operational security – that is, keeping the mission secret so that the arrival of the rescue team at the embassy would be a complete surprise. This severed the usual relationship between pilots and weather forecasters; the pilots were not informed about the local dust storms. Another security requirement was that the helicopter pilots come from the same unit. The unit picked for the mission was a U.S. Navy mine-laying unit flying CH-53D Sea Stallions; these helicopters were considered the best suited for the mission because of their long range, large capacity, and compatibility with shipboard operations.

After the mission and its failure were made known publicly, Khomeini credited divine intervention on behalf of Islam, and his prestige skyrocketed in Iran. Iranian officials who favored release of the hostages, such as President Bani Sadr, were weakened. In America, President Carter's political popularity and prospects for being re-elected in 1980 were further damaged after a television address on April 25 in which he explained the rescue operation and accepted responsibility for its failure.

==== Planned second attempt ====
A second rescue attempt, planned but never carried out, would have used highly modified YMC-130H Hercules aircraft. Three aircraft, outfitted with rocket thrusters to allow an extremely short landing and takeoff in the Shahid Shiroudi football stadium near the embassy, were modified under a rushed, top-secret program known as Operation Credible Sport. One crashed during a demonstration at Eglin Air Force Base on October 29, 1980, when its braking rockets were fired too soon. The misfire caused a hard touchdown that tore off the starboard wing and started a fire, but all on board survived. After Carter lost the presidential election in November, the project was abandoned.

The failed rescue attempt led to the creation of the 160th SOAR, a helicopter aviation Special Operations group.

== Resolution based on Algerian mediation ==
=== Iranian demands ===
Two days before the 1980 presidential elections in the United States, the Iranian parliament (Majlis) voted on November 2, 1980 the decision to release the American citizens detained in Iran if the United States accepted to meet a list of four conditions:

1. First and foremost to unfreeze Iranian assets in U.S. and international banks
2. To return the wealth collected by the late Shah during his reign
3. To withdraw all lawsuits against Iran in the United States
4. To pledge non-intervention in Iranian affairs

The message was immediately delivered by the Algerian foreign minister Sedikk Benyahia (Algeria being the protecting power of Iran in the United States) to the State Department with a letter confirming that the Algerian government was officially considered an intermediary by Iran.

The Iranian ministry of foreign affairs stressed that the United States government was requested to "announce its response as soon as possible" and "to inform the world" of the "American answer to the hostage release conditions".

=== American demands ===
Previously, at the request of the U.S. president Jimmy Carter, Algeria, which had been representing Iranian interests in Washington, D.C. (while Switzerland was representing US interests in Tehran), agreed to undertake a good offices mission in an attempt to facilitate a last-chance negotiation and the release of the hostages before Jimmy Carter left the White House. This mission, led by the Algerian Minister of Foreign Affairs, involved engaging in a diplomatic shuttle by the Algerian ambassadors in each capital to enable indirect talks between the United States and Iran.

=== First phase: Algerian mediation without intervention ===
==== "The mailmen" ====
The two Algerian ambassadors in both countries were tasked only with transmitting messages between the negotiating teams without intervening in the substance of the discussions. Hence, they were dubbed "the mailmen" by the press.

==== Deadlock of Iran–United States negotiations ====
As the U.S. State Department negotiators were unable to reach an agreement, based on the demands set by the vote of the Majlis, and as the Algerian team consisting of two ambassadors lacking any specific expertise, the negotiations were in a deadlock.

That, the sources said, is the case despite the State Department's announcement yesterday that Iran has raised several new questions about U.S. proposals for resolving the 14-month impasse. In another outwardly downbeat note yesterday, the department revealed that Deputy Secretary of State Warren M. Christopher, in a telephone message from Algiers, said that "serious problems continue to exist between the two sides."

Of principal concern to the Carter administration, the sources said, is that the linchpin of an agreement -- arrangements for transferring part of the estimated $8 to $14 billion in frozen Iranian assets held by the United States -- will take several weeks, or possibly months, to bring to the point that Iran feels sufficiently confident about U.S. faith to let the hostages go.

"U.S. Offers New Ideas To Iran To Expedite Freedom For Hostages U.S. Making New Hostage Proposals To Iran" in The Washington Post, Jan. 9, 1981

=== Second phase: Algerian intervention and proposal ===
Algeria started out as ''a simple mailman,'' delivering messages between the United States and Iran, but in the end it played a decisive mediator's role in the negotiations for the release of the 52 American hostages and the return to Iran of assets frozen in the United States.

Algerian sources close to the negotiations said Algeria had faithfully observed its role as an intermediary until about a month ago, when ''a deadlock'' was reached between American and Iranian negotiators.

"Wary Algeria Edged into Pivotal Role" The New York Times, Jan. 26, 1981

Realizing that the negotiations were certain to fail, just like previous attempts, due to complex issues that had remained unsolved, neither the State Department nor the Iranian authorities being unable to overcome the impasses, the Algerian authorities took the initiative to take an active part in the negotiations and entrusted the relaunch of these negotiations to Seghir Mostefai, highly experienced founder and head of the Central Bank of Algeria since the country's independence in 1962, long-time member of the board of governors of the IMF and World Bank. Throughout his career Mostefai had maintained long-standing working relationships with both the Federal Reserve Bank (the institution in charge of freezing Iranian assets) and the Markazi Bank (Iranian central bank). He was approved by both sides to resume the negotiations on new grounds.

When Algeria started to play this active role a team led by Warren Christopher with members of both the State Department and the Treasury Department arrived in Algiers.

He formulated the plan that was called by the Iranians the "Algerian proposal", a comprehensive agreement to resolve all disputes between the U.S. and Iran after he discussed with each party what claims and what conditions were acceptable to converge toward an agreement. The proposal included a trust-based role for the Central Bank of Algeria to facilitate the simultaneous release of U.S. hostages and the return of Iranian assets. Mostefai’s plan also envisioned the creation of an arbitration tribunal (later known as Iran-US Claims Tribunal, based in The Hague, Netherlands) to later resolve outstanding disputes progressively, enabling the release of American detainees without delay despite massive pending litigation.

=== Final phase: Algiers Accords ===
Negotiations on the Algerian proposal and the pivotal role played by the Algerian central bank finally led to the signing of the Algiers Accords by the three countries.

Based on the trusting relationship with the Algerian central bank, the Iranian authorities accepted that their assets would be transferred by the American authorities to an escrow account in the name of the Central Bank of Algeria acting as a neutral intermediary to collect the funds before the release of the hostages and to transfer these funds to Iran in a second phase after the release.

The Iranian assets under the form of gold bullion, cash and securities (mainly US Treasury Bonds) would be transferred to an escrow account of the Central Bank of Algeria kept at the Bank of England.

When the Bank of England notifies the Central Bank of Algeria that the agreed amount was transferred, the Iranians would be notified and the American hostages could be released.

One part of the transferred amount would be kept at the Central Bank of Algeria for pending settlements of U.S. claims to be presented to the arbitration tribunal progressively.

Finally, the United States transferred directly and indirectly to Iran a total amount of USD 7.956 billion (equivalent to USD 25+ billion in 2020).

==== Preparations at Algiers Airport ====
The Algerian authorities sent two identical Boeing 727 planes belonging to the national airlines company Air Algérie and a medical team.

The American hostages were transported from the different places where they were detained to Tehran airport. The Algerian medical team examined all the hostages and found them in good condition. When authorization was given by the Iranian authorities following Central Bank of Algeria’s confirmation that it had received the deposits, the boarding started. A group of the Algerian army’s special forces was present to oversee the boarding which was the moment the American citizens were officially put under the responsibility of Algeria.

The Algerian delegation and the American hostages were going to fly in the same plane. But for security reasons the second plane was used by the Algerians as a decoy due to the context of increasing military tension with Iraq.

After a stop in Greece the plane landed in Algiers. The Americans were greeted by Warren Christopher, the signatory of the Algiers Accords. At the airport, the Algerian authorities officially handed the hostages to the American delegation who took them in a U.S. Army aircraft to a US Air Force base in Wiesbaden before flying to the United States.

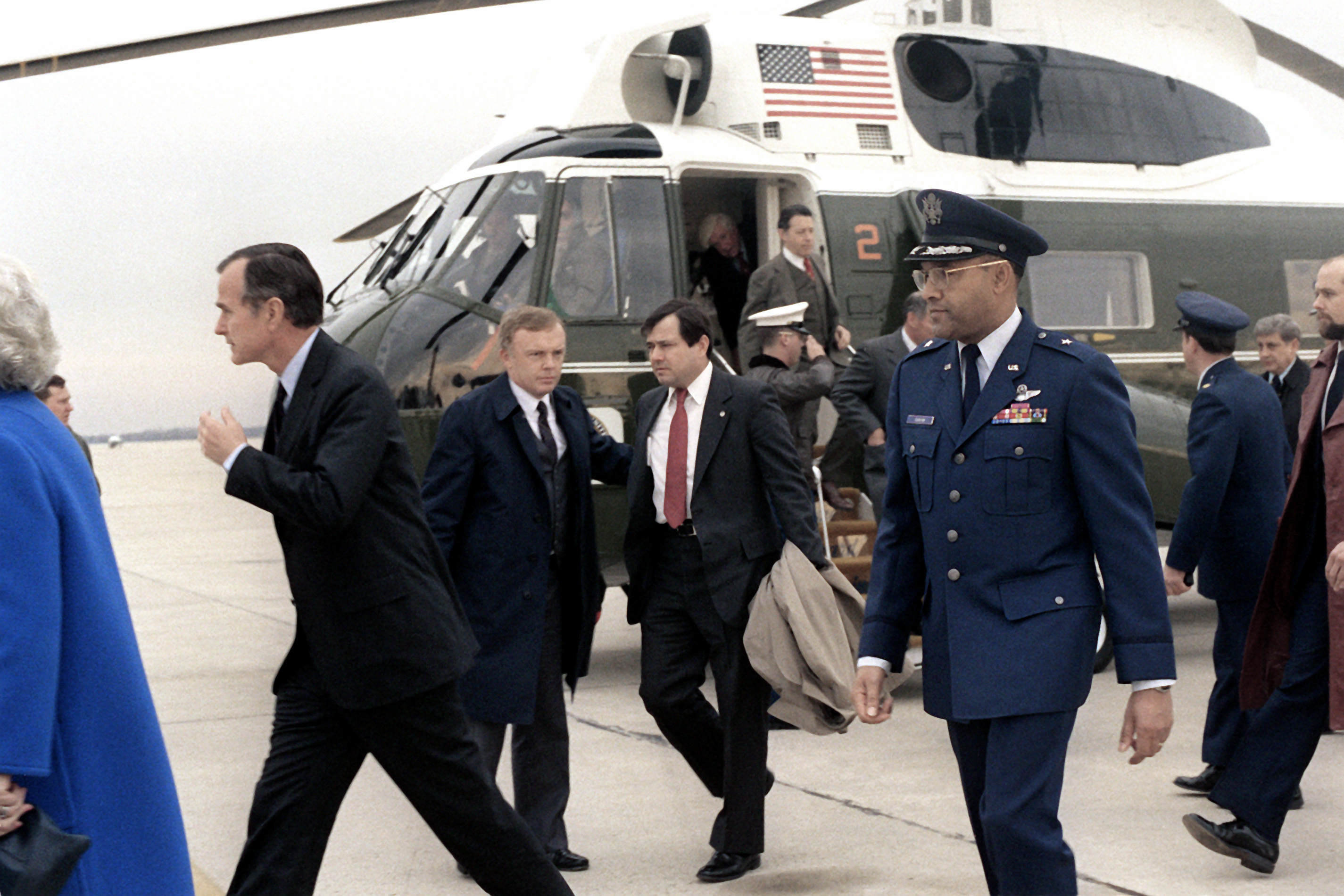
Vice President George H. W. Bush and other VIPs wait to welcome the hostages home.

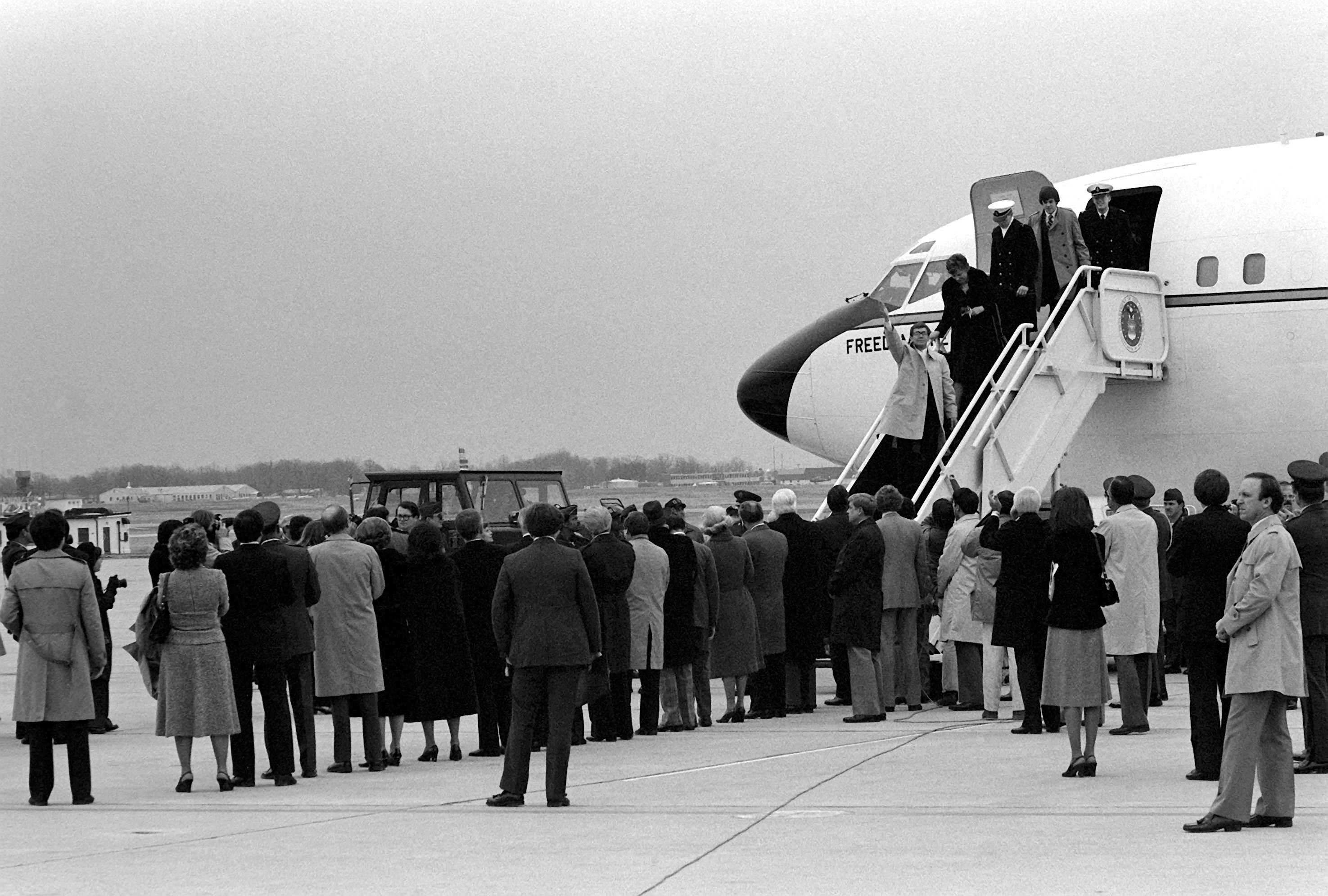
The hostages disembark Freedom One, an Air Force Boeing C-137 Stratoliner aircraft, upon their return.

== Release of the hostages ==
With the completion of negotiations signified by the signing of the Algiers Accords on January 19, 1981, the hostages were released the following day. Just minutes after Ronald Reagan was sworn in as president and while he was giving his inaugural address, the 52 American hostages were released to U.S. personnel. There are theories regarding why Iran postponed the release until that moment.

=== Transfer to American custody ===
The hostages were flown on an Air Algérie Boeing 727-200 commercial airliner (registration 7T-VEM) from Tehran, Iran to Algiers, Algeria, where they were formally transferred to Warren M. Christopher, the representative of the United States, as a symbolic gesture of appreciation for the Algerian government's help in resolving the crisis. The flight continued to Rhein-Main Air Base in West Germany and on to an Air Force hospital in Wiesbaden, where former President Carter, acting as emissary, received them. After medical check-ups and debriefings, the hostages made a second flight to a refueling stop in Shannon, Ireland, where they were greeted by a large crowd. The released hostages were then flown to Stewart Air National Guard Base in Newburgh, New York. From Newburgh, they traveled by bus to the United States Military Academy at West Point and stayed at the Thayer Hotel for three days, receiving a heroes' welcome all along the route. Ten days after their release, they were given a ticker tape parade through the Canyon of Heroes in New York City.

== Aftermath ==
=== Iran–Iraq War ===
The Iraqi invasion of Iran took place less than a year after the hostage-taking of American embassy employees in Tehran. According to journalist Stephen Kinzer, the rapid deterioration of American–Iranian relations, from close allies to hostile adversaries, emboldened Iraqi leader Saddam Hussein to launch the invasion. Kinzer further argues that the United States’ hostility toward Iran subsequently influenced its decision to support Iraq after the war began to turn against Hussein. The United States supplied Iraq with, among other things, "helicopters and satellite intelligence that was used in selecting bombing targets." This assistance "deepened and widened anti-American feeling in Iran."

=== Consequences for Iran ===
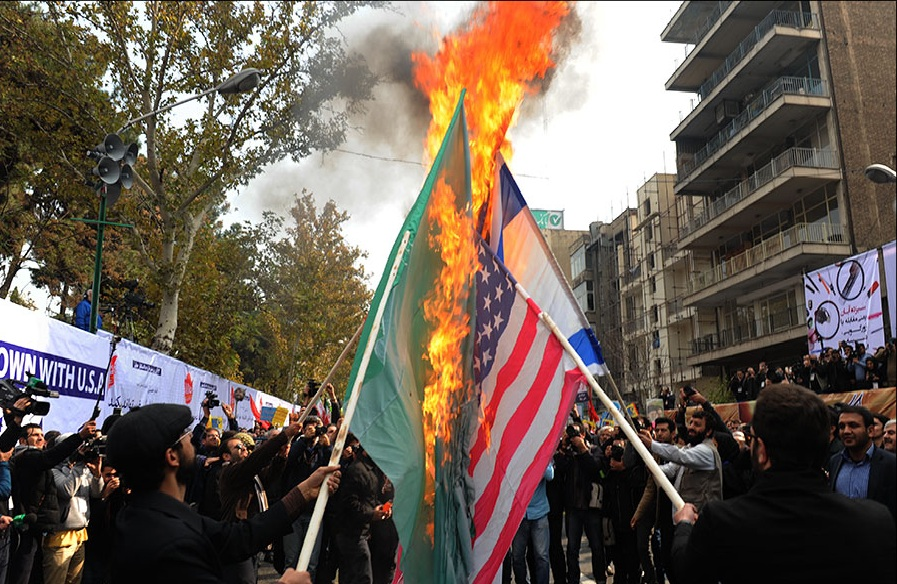
A protest in Tehran on November 4, 2015, against the United States, Israel, and Saudi Arabia.

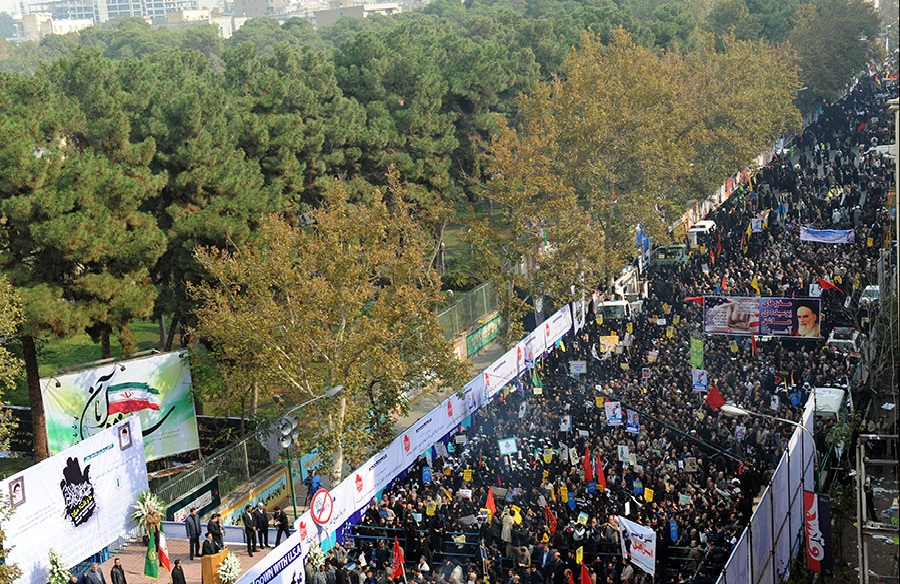
The November 2015 protest in Tehran.

The hostage crisis is generally regarded as unsuccessful for Iran, as the negotiated settlement with the United States failed to achieve any of Iran's original demands. Iran lost international support for its war against Iraq. However, anti-Americanism intensified, and the crisis served to benefit those Iranians who had supported it. Politicians such as Khoeiniha and Behzad Nabavi were left in a stronger position, while those associated with – or accused of association with – the U.S. were removed from the political picture. Khomeini biographer, Baqer Moin, described the crisis as "a watershed in Khomeini's life" that transformed him from "a cautious, pragmatic politician" into "a modern revolutionary single-mindedly pursuing a dogma." In Khomeini's statements, imperialism and liberalism were "negative words," while revolution "became a sacred word, sometimes more important than Islam."

The Iranian government commemorates the event every year with a demonstration at the embassy and the burning of an American flag. However, on November 4, 2009, pro-democracy protesters and reformists demonstrated in the streets of Tehran. When the authorities encouraged them to chant "death to America," the protesters instead chanted "death to the dictator" (referring to Iran's Supreme Leader, Ayatollah Ali Khamenei) and other anti-government slogans.

=== Consequences for the United States ===
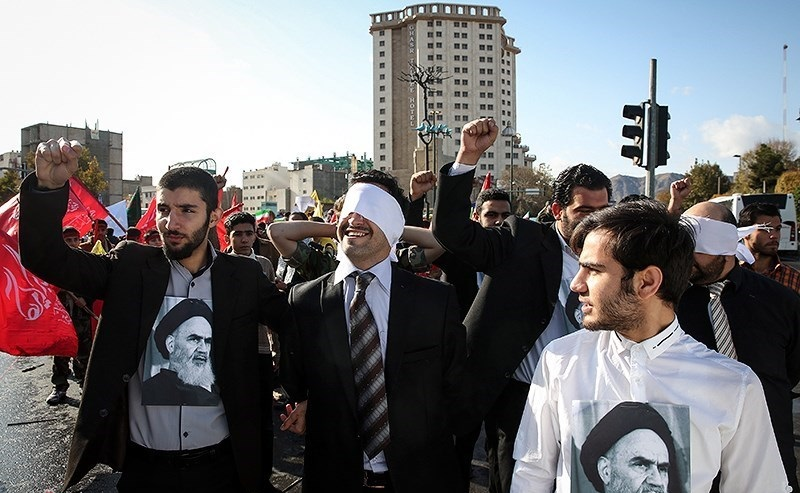
Simulation of the first day of the event, 3 November 2016, Tehran

Gifts, including lifetime passes to any minor league or Major League Baseball game, were showered on the hostages upon their return to the United States.

In 2000, the hostages and their families tried unsuccessfully to sue Iran under the Antiterrorism Act of 1996. They originally won the case when Iran failed to provide a defense, but the State Department then tried to end the lawsuit, fearing that it would make international relations difficult. As a result, a federal judge ruled that no damages could be awarded to the hostages because of the agreement the United States had made when the hostages were freed.

The former U.S. Embassy building is now used by Iran's government and affiliated groups. Since 2001 it has served as a museum to the revolution. Outside the door, there is a bronze model based on the Statue of Liberty on one side and a statue portraying one of the hostages on the other.

The Guardian reported in 2006 that a group called the Committee for the Commemoration of Martyrs of the Global Islamic Campaign had used the embassy to recruit "martyrdom seekers": volunteers to carry out operations against Western and Israeli targets. Mohammad Samadi, a spokesman for the group, signed up several hundred volunteers in a few days.

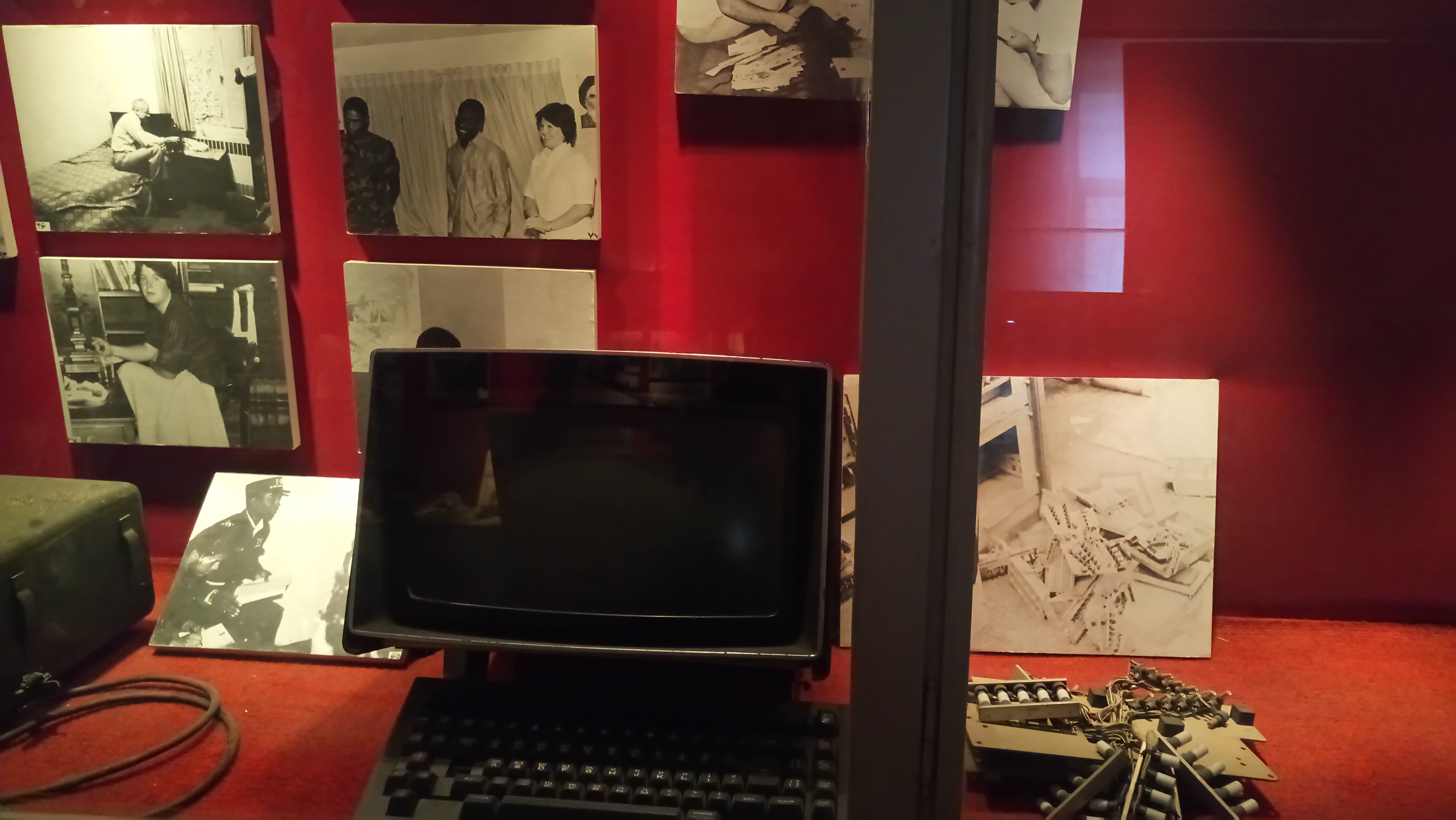
Iran hostage crisis memorial

=== Severance of Iran–United States relations ===
The United States and Iran broke off formal diplomatic relations over the hostage crisis. Iran selected Algeria as its protecting power in the United States, transferring the mandate to Pakistan in 1992. The United States selected Switzerland as its protecting power in Iran. Relations are maintained through the Iranian Interests Section of the Pakistani Embassy and the U.S. Interests Section of the Swiss Embassy.

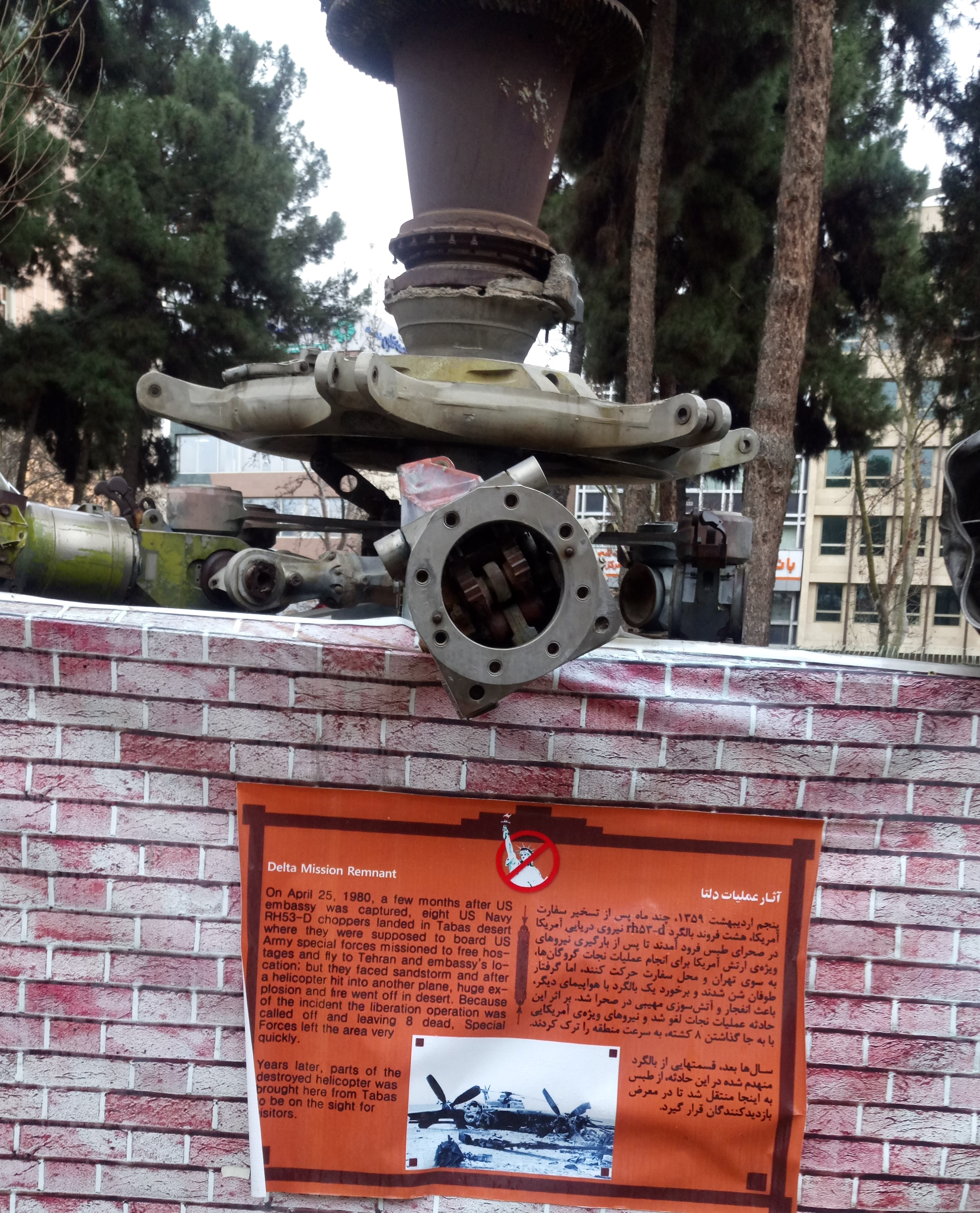
Operation Eagle Claw remnant in the former embassy

== Hostages and assailants ==
There were 66 original captives: 63 of them were taken at the embassy and three of them were captured and held at the Foreign Ministry offices. Three of the hostages were operatives of the CIA. One of them was a chemical engineering student from URI.

Thirteen hostages were released on November 19–20, 1979, and one hostage was released on July 11, 1980.

=== Diplomats who evaded capture ===
- Robert Anders, – consular officer
- Mark J. Lijek, 29 – consular officer
- Cora A. Lijek, 25 – consular assistant
- Henry L. Schatz, 31 – agriculture attaché
- Joseph D. Stafford, 29 – consular officer
- Kathleen F. Stafford, 28 – consular assistant

=== Hostages who were released on November 19, 1979 ===
- Kathy Gross, 22 – secretary
- Sgt Ladell Maples, USMC, 23 – Marine Corps embassy guard
- Sgt William Quarles, USMC, 23 – Marine Corps embassy guard

=== Hostages who were released on November 20, 1979 ===
- Sgt James Hughes, USAF, 30 – Air Force administrative manager
- Lillian Johnson, 32 – secretary
- Elizabeth Montagne – secretary
- Lloyd Rollins – administrative officer
- Capt Neal (Terry) Robinson, USAF, – Air Force military intelligence officer
- Terri Tedford, 24 – secretary
- MSgt Joseph Vincent, USAF, – Air Force administrative manager
- Sgt David Walker, USMC, 25 – Marine Corps embassy guard
- Joan Walsh, 33 – secretary
- Cpl Westley Williams, USMC, 24 – Marine Corps embassy guard

=== Hostage who was released in July 1980 ===
- Richard Queen, 28 – vice consul

=== Hostages who were released in January 1981 ===
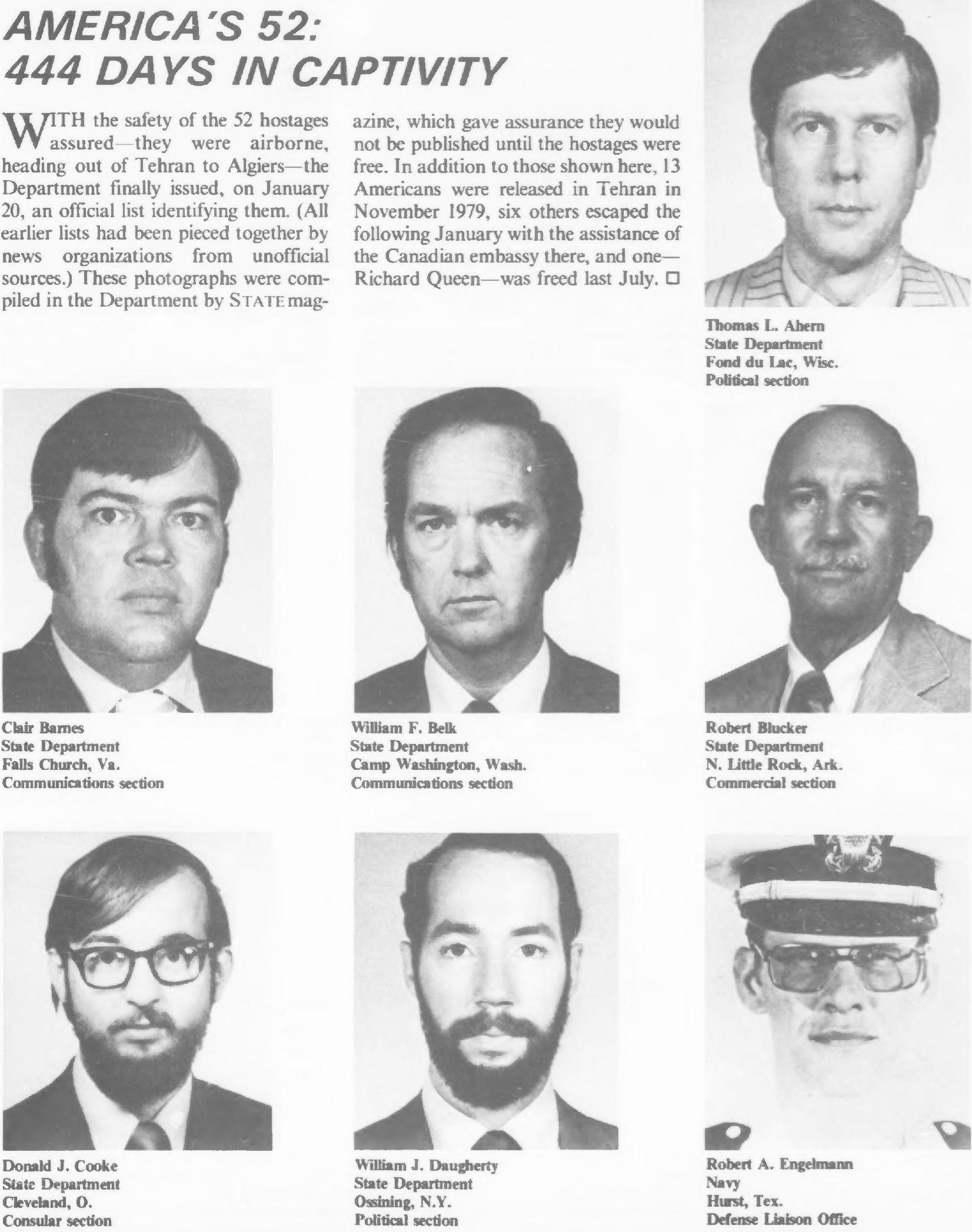
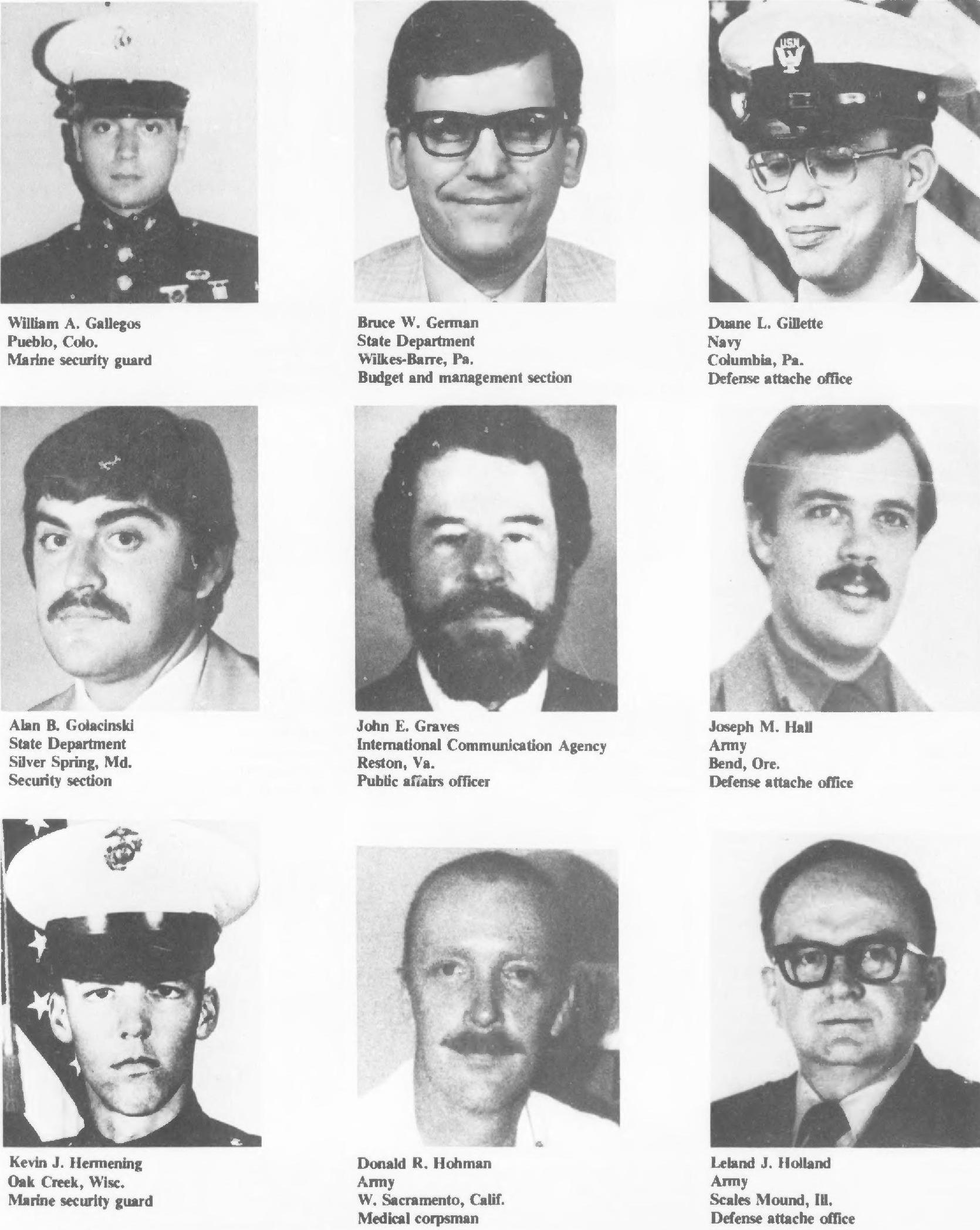
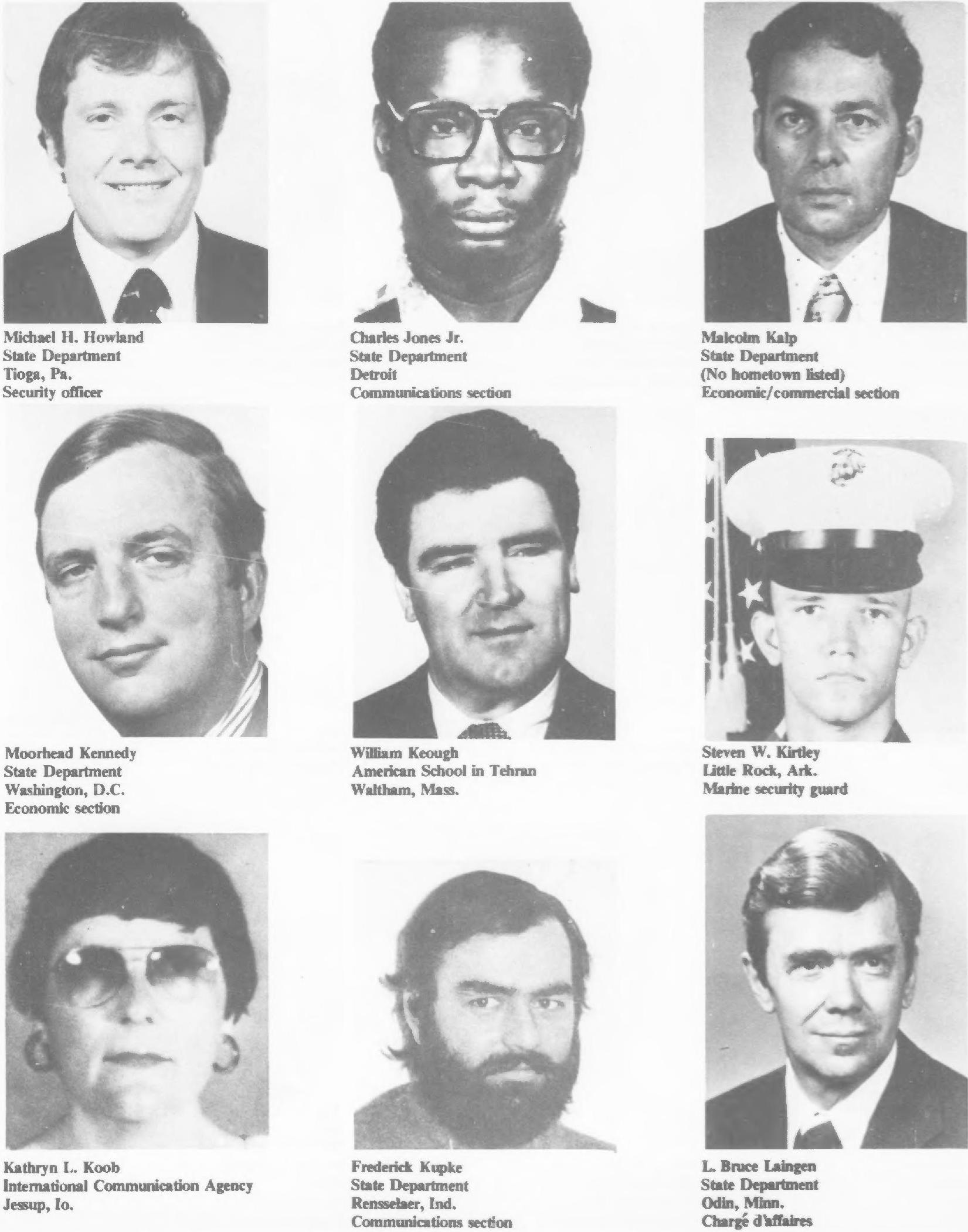
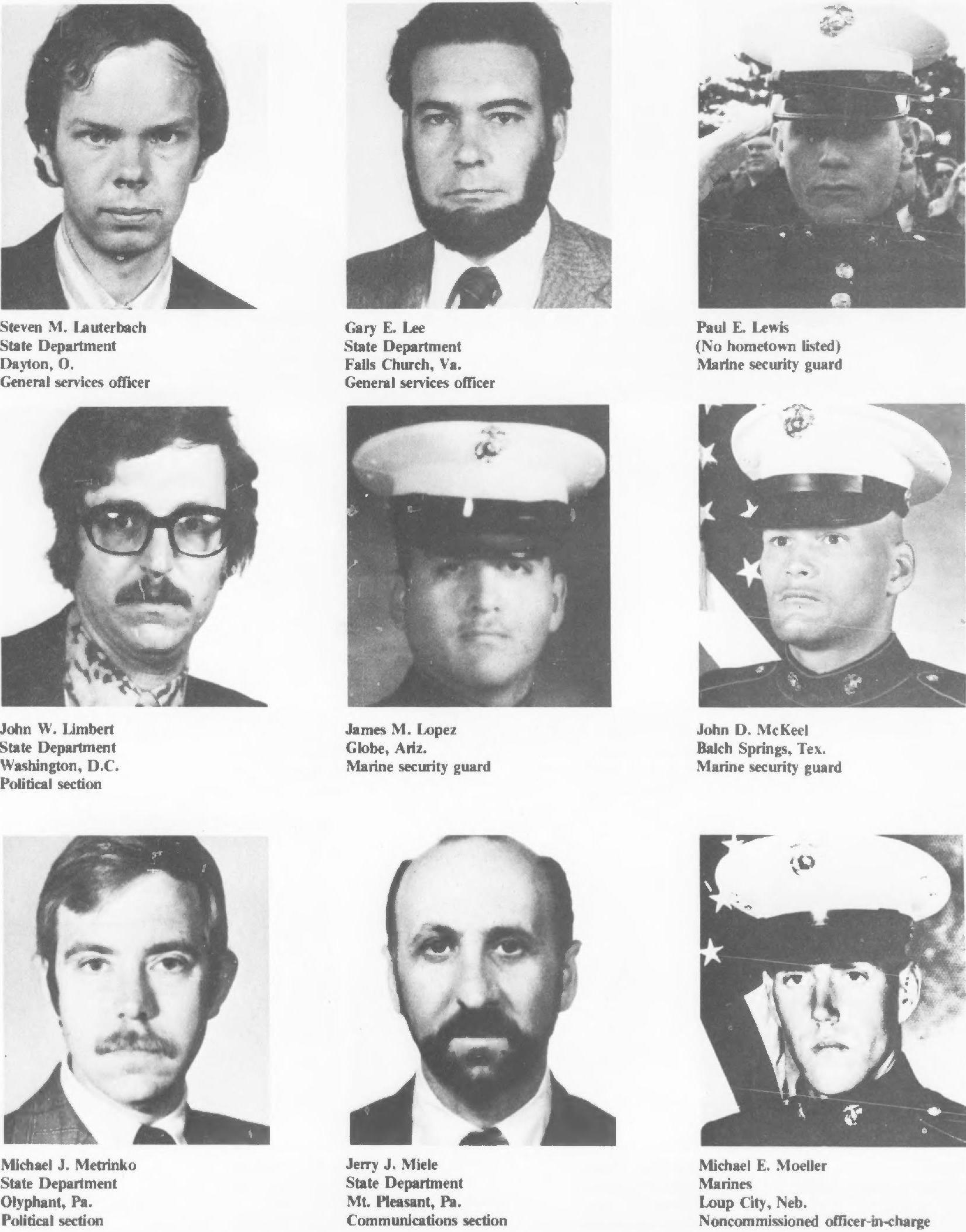
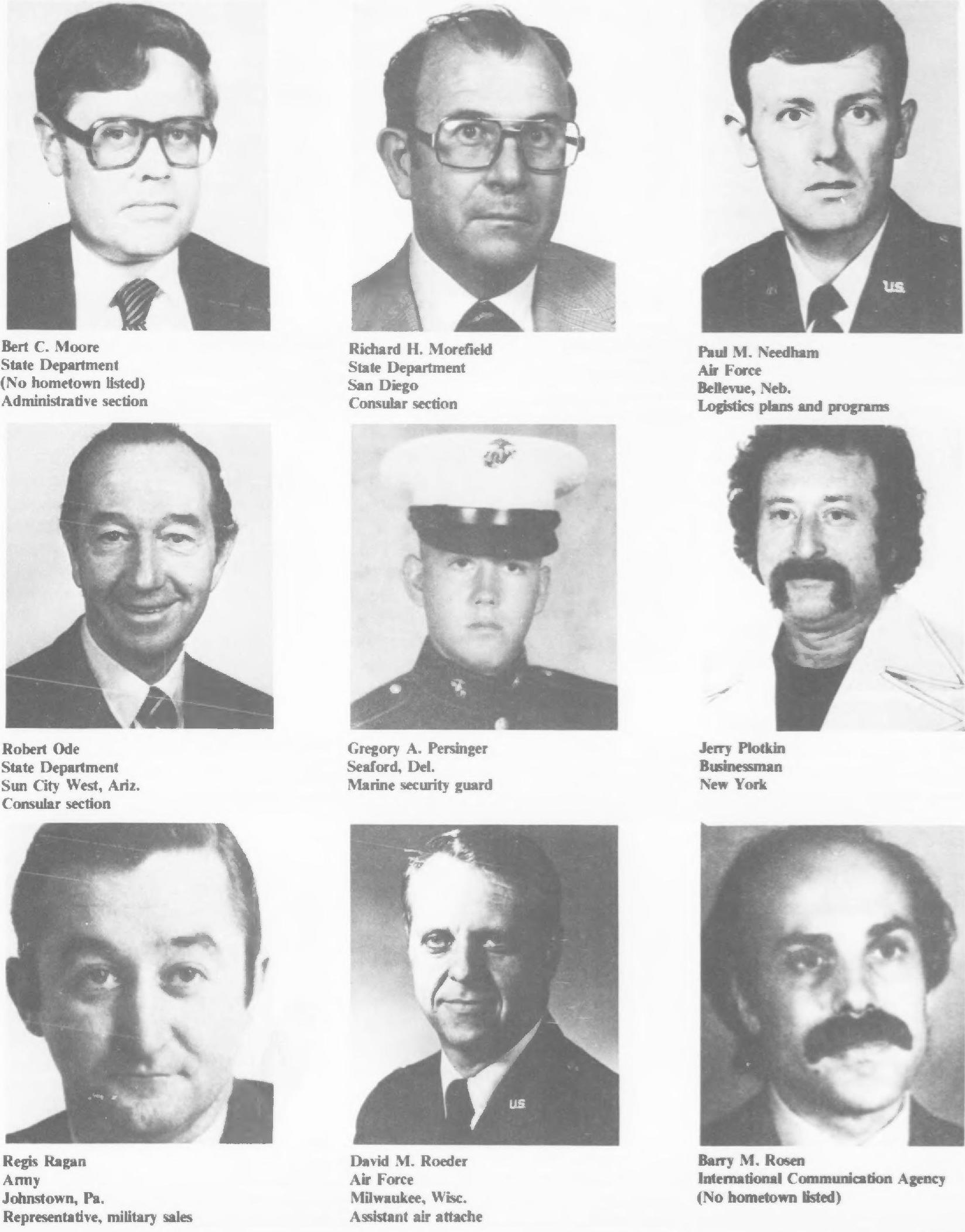
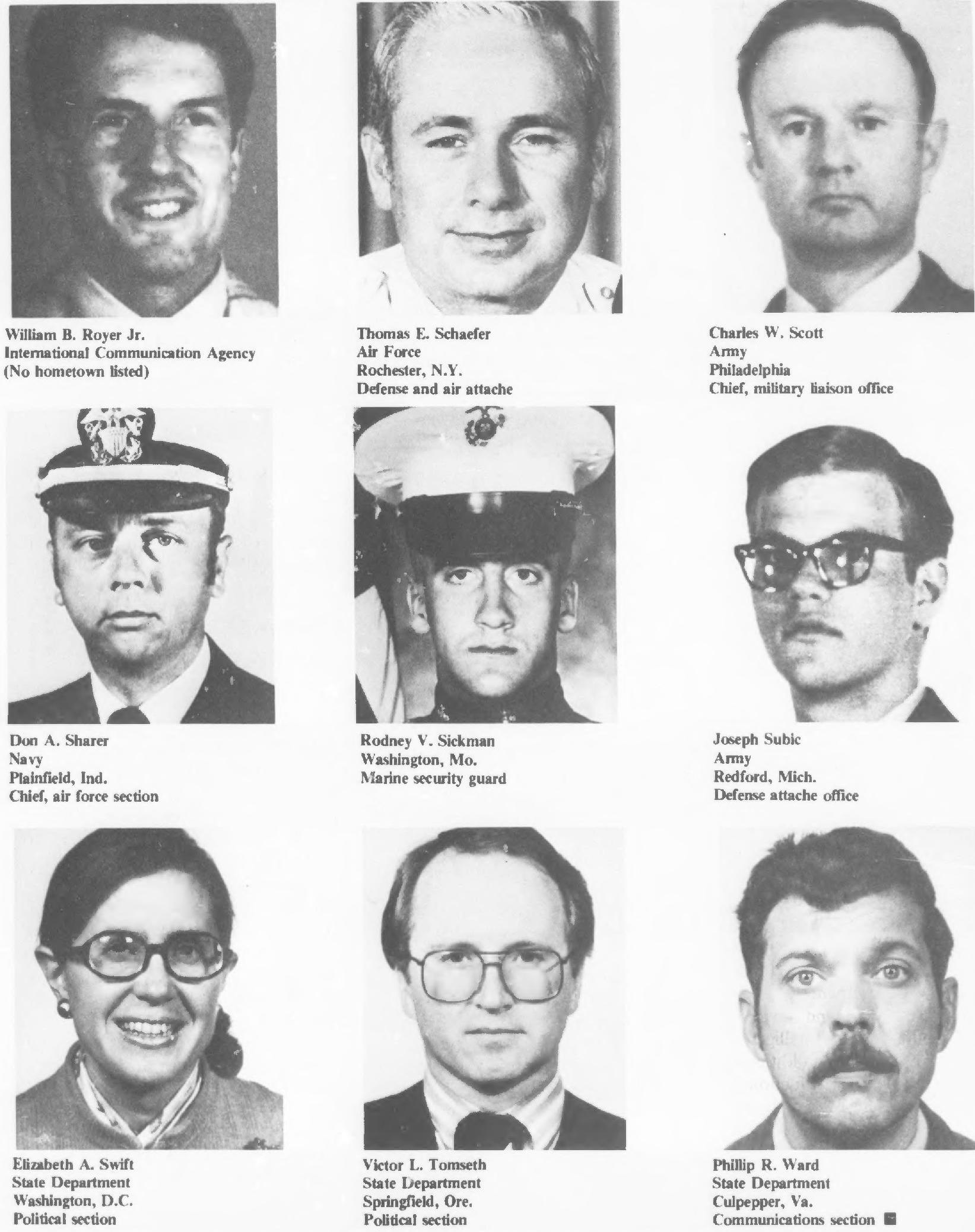
The 52 hostages released in January 1981, pictured in State Magazine
- Thomas L. Ahern, Jr. – narcotics control officer (Note: Later identified as CIA station chief)
- Clair Cortland Barnes, – communications specialist
- William E. Belk, – communications and records officer
- Robert O. Blucker, – economics officer
- Donald J. Cooke, – vice consul
- William J. Daugherty, – third secretary of U.S. mission (CIA officer)
- LCDR Robert Engelmann, USN, – Navy attaché
- Sgt William Gallegos, USMC, – Marine Corps guard
- Bruce W. German, – budget officer
- IS1 Duane L. Gillette, – Navy communications and intelligence specialist
- Alan B. Golacinski, – chief of embassy security, regional security officer
- John E. Graves, – public affairs officer
- CW3 Joseph M. Hall, USA, – Army attaché
- Sgt Kevin J. Hermening, USMC, – Marine Corps guard
- SFC Donald R. Hohman, USA, – Army medic
- COL Leland J. Holland, USA, – military attaché
- Michael Howland, – assistant regional security officer
- Charles A. Jones, Jr. – communications specialist, teletype operator (Note: Only unreleased African-American hostage)
- Malcolm K. Kalp, commercial officer
- Moorhead C. Kennedy Jr., – economic and commercial officer
- William F. Keough, Jr. – superintendent of the American School in Islamabad (Note: Visiting Tehran at time of embassy seizure)
- Cpl Steven W. Kirtley, USMC – Marine Corps guard
- Kathryn L. Koob, – embassy cultural officer (Note: One of two unreleased female hostages)
- Frederick Lee Kupke, – communications officer and electronics specialist
- L. Bruce Laingen,– chargé d'affaires
- Steven Lauterbach, – administrative officer
- Gary E. Lee, – administrative officer
- Sgt Paul Edward Lewis, USMC, – Marine Corps guard
- John W. Limbert, Jr., – political officer
- Sgt James M. Lopez, USMC, – Marine Corps guard
- Sgt John D. McKeel, Jr., USMC, – Marine Corps guard
- Michael J. Metrinko, – political officer
- Jerry J. Miele, – communications officer
- SSgt Michael E. Moeller, USMC, – head of Marine Corps guard unit
- Bert C. Moore, – administration counselor
- Richard Morefield, – consul general
- Capt Paul M. Needham, Jr., USAF, – Air Force logistics staff officer
- Robert C. Ode, – retired foreign service officer on temporary duty in Tehran
- Sgt Gregory A. Persinger, USMC, – Marine Corps guard
- Jerry Plotkin, – civilian businessman visiting Tehran
- MSG Regis Ragan, USA, – Army soldier, defense attaché's office
- Lt Col David M. Roeder, USAF, – deputy Air Force attaché
- Barry M. Rosen, – press attaché
- William B. Royer, Jr., – assistant director of Iran–American Society
- Col Thomas E. Schaefer, USAF, – Air Force attaché
- COL Charles W. Scott, USA, – Army attaché
- CDR Donald A. Sharer, USN, – Naval attaché
- Sgt Rodney V. (Rocky) Sickmann, USMC, – Marine Corps guard
- SSG Joseph Subic, Jr., USA, – military police, Army, defense attaché's office
- Elizabeth Ann Swift, – deputy head of political section
- Victor L. Tomseth, – counselor for political affairs
- Phillip R. Ward, – CIA communications officer

=== Other hostages who were released after the crisis ===
A small number of hostages, not captured at the embassy, were taken in Iran during the same time period. All were released by late 1982.

- Jerry Plotkin – American businessman released January 1981.
- Mohi Sobhani – Iranian-American engineer and member of the Baháʼí Faith. Released February 4, 1981.
- Zia Nassry – Afghan-American. Released November 1982.
- Cynthia Dwyer – American reporter, arrested May 5, 1980, charged with espionage and freed on February 10, 1981.
- Paul Chiapparone and Bill Gaylord – Electronic Data Systems (EDS) employees, rescued by team led by retired United States Army Special Forces Colonel "Bull" Simons, funded by EDS owner Ross Perot, in 1979.
- Four British missionaries, including John Coleman; his wife, Audrey Coleman; and Jean Waddell; released in late 1981

=== United States awards and honours ===
All State Department and CIA employees who were taken hostage received the State Department Award for Valor. Political Officer Michael J. Metrinko received two: one for his time as a hostage and another for his daring rescue of Americans who had been jailed in Tabriz months before the embassy takeover.

The U.S. military later awarded the 20 servicemen among the hostages the Defense Meritorious Service Medal. The only hostage serviceman not issued the medal was Staff Sgt Joseph Subic, Jr., who "did not behave under stress the way noncommissioned officers are expected to act" – that is, he cooperated with the hostage-takers, according to other hostages.

The Humanitarian Service Medal was awarded to the servicemen of Joint Task Force 1–79, the planning authority for Operation Rice Bowl/Eagle Claw, who participated in the rescue attempt.

The Air Force Special Operations component of the mission was given the Air Force Outstanding Unit award for performing their part of the mission flawlessly, including evacuating the Desert One refueling site under extreme conditions.

==== Compensation payments ====
The deal that freed them reached between the United States and Iran and brokered by Algeria in January 1981 prevented the hostages from claiming any restitution from Iran due to foreign sovereign immunity and an executive agreement known as the Algiers Accords, which barred such lawsuits. After failing in the courts, the former hostages turned to Congress and won support from both Democrats and Republicans, resulting in Congress passing a bill (2015 United States Victims of State Sponsored Terrorism Act [USVSST]) in December 2015 that afforded the hostages compensation from a fund to be financed from fines imposed on companies found guilty of breaking American sanctions against Iran. The bill authorised a payment of US$10,000 for each day in captivity (per hostage) as well as a lump sum of $600,000 in compensation for each of the spouses and children of the Iran hostages. This meant that each hostage would be paid up to US$4.4 million. The first funds into the trust account from which the compensation would be paid came from a part of the $9 billion penalty paid by the Paris-based bank BNP Paribas for violating sanctions against Iran, Cuba and Sudan.

Some of the ex-hostages and their families received payments, but then Justice Department lawyers interpreted the law to allow 9/11 family members to get a judgment against Iran as well and to apply to the USVSST fund. Later, victims of the 1983 Beirut barracks bombings also instituted claims against USVSST fund. Due to depletion of the fund, by February 2019, only 17.8% of the legislated amount had been paid to the freed hostages and their direct families.

=== Notable hostage-takers, guards, or interrogators ===
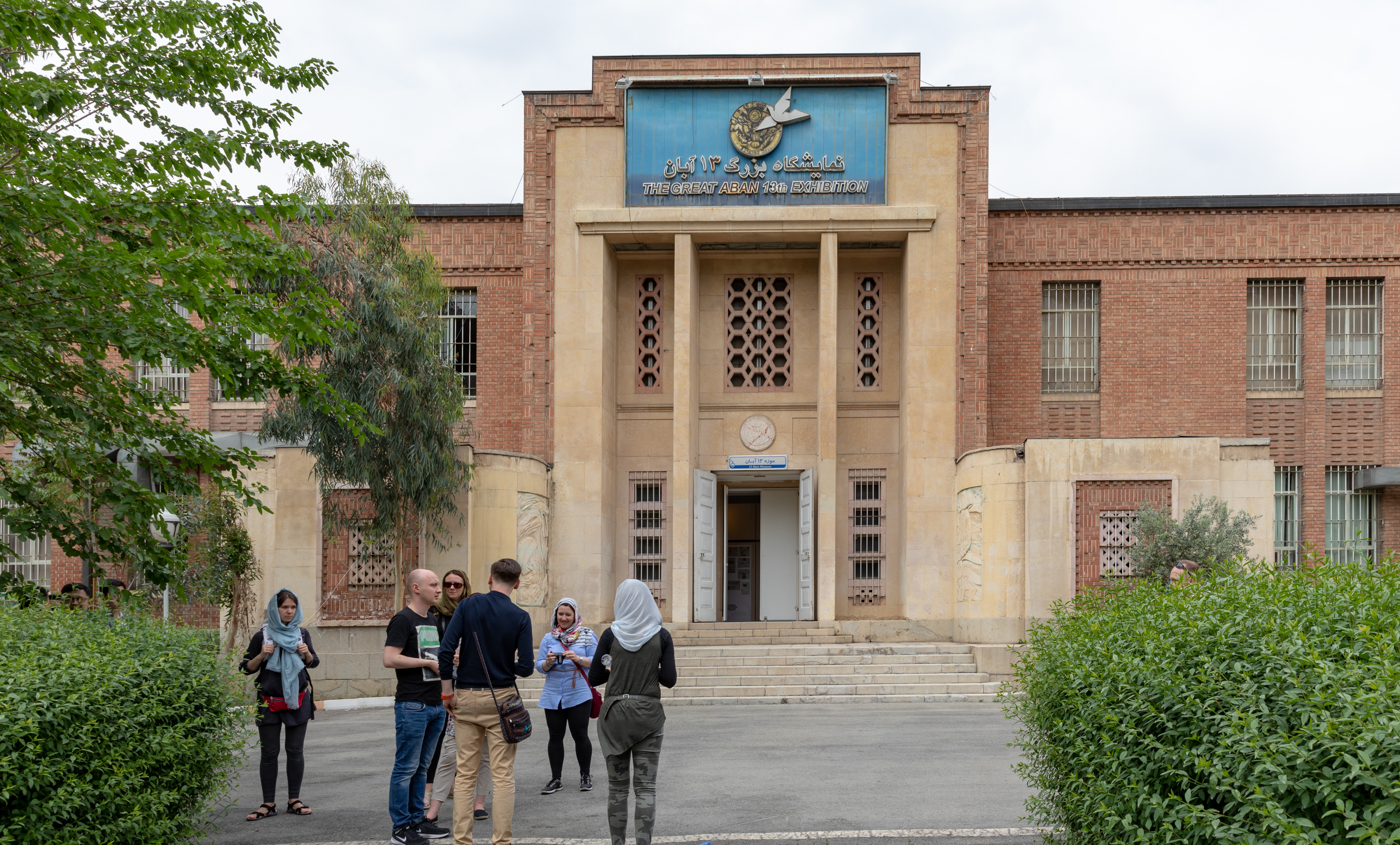
The former US embassy, known as the "espionage den," "den of espionage", and "nest of spies" by the Iranians after the crisis.

- Abbas Abdi – reformist, journalist, self-taught sociologist, and social activist.
- Hamid Aboutalebi – former Iranian ambassador to the United Nations.
- Ebrahim Asgharzadeh – then a student; later an Iranian political activist and politician, member of Parliament (1989–1993), and chairman of City Council of Tehran (1999–2003).
- Mohsen Mirdamadi – member of Parliament (2000–2004), head of Islamic Iran Participation Front.
- Masoumeh Ebtekar – interpreter and spokeswoman for the student group that occupied the embassy; later a scientist, journalist, first female Vice President of Iran, and head of Environment Protection Organization of Iran.
- Mohammad Mousavi Khoeiniha – spiritual leader of the hostage-takers.
- Hossein Sheikholeslam – then a student; later a member of Parliament and Iranian ambassador to Syria, died during the COVID-19 outbreak in 2020.

==== 1980 October Surprise theory ====
The timing of the release of the hostages gave rise to allegations that representatives of Reagan's presidential campaign had conspired with Iran to delay the release until after the 1980 United States presidential election to thwart Carter from pulling off an "October surprise". In 1992, Gary Sick, the former national security adviser to Ford and Carter, presented the strongest accusations in an editorial that appeared in The New York Times, and others, including former Iranian president Abolhassan Banisadr, repeated and added to them. This alleged plot to influence the outcome of the 1980 United States presidential election between Carter and Reagan became known as the 1980 October Surprise theory.

After twelve years of varying media attention, both houses of the United States Congress held separate inquiries and concluded that credible evidence supporting the allegation was absent or insufficient.

In May 2023, Sick, former Carter administration Chief Domestic Policy Advisor Stuart E. Eizenstat, author Kai Bird, and journalist Jonathan Alter published an article in The New Republic outlining the various allegations and circumstantial evidence (including Barnes' allegations in The New York Times) that have emerged in the decades following the earlier investigations, declaring the credibility of the theory to be "all but settled."

== In popular culture ==
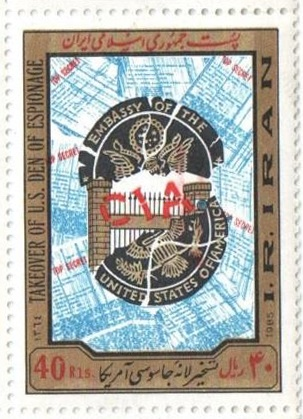
Iranian stamp marking the "Takeover of U.S. Den of Espionage"

Over 80 songs which are about the Iran hostage crisis or contain references to it have been released.

- Laurie Anderson's surprise 1982 UK #2 hit "O Superman" was a response to the crisis, and to Operation Eagle Claw in particular.
- The 1982 international hit "I Ran (So Far Away)" by A Flock of Seagulls does not actually refer to the crisis, but as Dave Thompson has said, the song was "punningly political" to American listeners.
- The 1980 song "Bomb Iran" were several parodies of the song "Barbara Ann".
- The 1986 film Delta Force opened with Operation Eagle Claw.

The 2012 Hollywood film Argo, which won the Academy Award for Best Picture, was based on the Canadian Caper rescue.

The 2020 video game, Call of Duty: Black Ops Cold War, has missions centered on the aftermath of the crisis in the early 1980's.

In 2022, HBO released a 4-part documentary series titled Hostages.

== See also ==
- The role of Algeria in the resolution of the American hostages crisis
- Attacks on the United States
- Robert Whitney Imbrie – First U.S. diplomat murdered in Persia
- 1979 U.S. embassy burning in Islamabad
- 2011 attack on the British Embassy in Iran
- 2016 attack on the Saudi diplomatic missions in Iran
- Attack on the United States embassy in Baghdad
- Avenue of Flags, park in the city of Hermitage in Mercer County, Pennsylvania, United States, erected during the crisis in order to honor the American diplomats who were being held hostage in Tehran, Iran.
- Case Concerning United States Diplomatic and Consular Staff in Tehran
- Lebanon hostage crisis
- List of foreign nationals detained in Iran
- List of hostage crises
- Nightline: This ABC News program named "The Iran Crisis: America Held Hostage" got its start as a method for informing viewers of the latest developments during the crisis. The current title premiered on March 24, 1980, with Ted Koppel as anchor.
- United Nations Security Council Resolution 457 and 461 (1979) on the hostage crisis
- Iran's hostage diplomacy

== Cited sources ==
- Bakhash, Shaul (1984). The Reign of the Ayatollahs: Iran and the Islamic Revolution. Basic Books. ISBN 0-465-06887-1.
- Bowden, Mark (2006). Guests of the Ayatollah: The Iran Hostage Crisis: The First Battle in America's War with Militant Islam. New York: Grove Press. ISBN 0-87113-925-1.
- Farber, David (1979). Taken Hostage. Princeton University Press. ISBN 1-4008-2620-9.
- Holloway, J. L. III; Special Operations Review Group (1980). "[Iran Hostage] Mission Rescue Report". U.S. Joint Chiefs of Staff. Archived from the original on May 2, 2013.
- Moin, Baqer (2000). Khomeini: Life of the Ayatollah. Thomas Dunne Books. ISBN 978-1-85043-128-2.
- Weingarten, Reid H. (November 19, 1992). The "October Surprise" allegations and the circumstances surrounding the release of the American hostages held in Iran. Washington, D.C.: United States Government Printing Office. ISBN 0-16-039795-2. OCLC 28306929. S. Rpt. No. 102-125.
