= Richard Queen =

American diplomat (1951–2002)

Richard Ivan Queen (August 7, 1951 – August 14, 2002) was born in Washington, D.C., and worked for the U.S. State Department as Vice Consul at the U.S. Embassy in Tehran, Iran. On November 4, 1979, he was among the 66 hostages taken by Islamic militants calling themselves the Muslim Student Followers of the Imam's Line, an event commonly known as the Iran hostage crisis.

== Time as a hostage and release ==
Richard Queen began to physically deteriorate fairly early during his confinement. While the hostage takers were aware of his ailment, the doctor they provided repeatedly misdiagnosed his ailment as a "Twisted Spine". As his illness progressed and it became increasingly difficult for Queen to stand or walk, he was finally taken to a local hospital where he was examined by the neurologist Dr Mehryar for a more thorough evaluation. After Mehryar's consultation, the hostage takers determined that Queen's illness required they release him. Queen was later diagnosed with multiple sclerosis. He was held hostage for 250 days and released on July 11, 1980. Thirteen hostages had been released on November 20, 1979 (after 16 days). The remaining 52 hostages were released on January 20, 1981 (after 444 days).

Richard Queen died on August 14, 2002, in Falls Church, Virginia, due to complications from multiple sclerosis.

He was a graduate of Edgemont High School, class of 1969 and Hamilton College, class of 1973.

== See also ==
- List of kidnappings
- List of solved missing person cases: 1950–1999
