= American Schools and Hospitals Abroad =

The office of American Schools and Hospitals Abroad (ASHA) is an organizational unit within the Bureau of Democracy, Conflict, and Humanitarian Assistance (DCHA) at the United States Agency for International Development (USAID). ASHA is charged by the President of the United States with administering a worldwide assistance program with the objective of promoting American ideas and values abroad.

The goal of the ASHA program is to strengthen self-sustaining schools, libraries and medical centers that best demonstrate American ideas and practices abroad. ASHA assistance is provided to private non-profit institutions, which are continuously identified as American and act as effective cultural presence centers.

== Authorizing Legislation ==
The basic authorization for the ASHA program was contained first in the Smith-Mundt Act of 1947, followed by the Mutual Security Act of 1957, and more recently the Foreign Assistance Act of 1961, as amended, Section 214. To date, ASHA has assisted 300 educational and medical institutions abroad.

== USAID ASHA Global Programs ==
The ASHA program has facilitated the development of superior libraries, schools, and medical centers in over 76 countries, thus impacting the regions of Africa, Asia, Eurasia, Europe, Latin America, the Caribbean and the Middle East. Annually, the ASHA office manages a worldwide portfolio of over 110 grants and continues to award several dozen new grants every year.

ASHA grants are awarded to assist in capital improvements such as building or renovation of facilities and procurement of scientific, medical, and educational equipment. The overseas institutions are encouraged to fund a portion of their operating expenses from tuition, fees, private contributions, and earnings from endowments.

== USAID ASHA Grant Eligibility Criteria ==
Pursuant to Section 214 of the Foreign Assistance Act of 1961, as amended, grant assistance is made available to schools and libraries outside the United States founded or sponsored by United States citizens and serving as study and demonstration centers for ideas and practices of the United States, and to hospital centers for medical education and research outside the United States, founded or sponsored by United States citizens. Grants made under this program help such institutions demonstrate to people overseas the achievements of the United States in education and medicine.

The applicant must be a non-profit U.S. organization, which either founded or sponsors the institution for which assistance is sought. The applicant, for example, can be a nonprofit university or a tax exempt organization under Section 501(c) (3) of the Internal Revenue Code of 1954 as amended.

The applicant must demonstrate a continuing supportive relationship with the overseas institution. Evidence of this would be the provision of financial and management support for the institution.

== USAID ASHA Global Partners ==
ASHA has had a long history of working with overseas schools and hospital to: • Provide the benefits of American ideals and practices in education and health • Serve as demonstration and study centers of those ideas and practices • Foster interchange, mutual understanding, and favorable relations with the United States. Some of the past and recent grantees include the American University in Cairo, Sega Girls School in Tanzania, Earth University in Costa Rica, Hadassah Medical Center, Johns Hopkins University, and Tilganga Eye Hospital in Nepal. For a current list of the partners and areas where the Office of American Schools and Hospitals works, see: https://web.archive.org/web/20130602163458/http://www.usaid.gov/work-usaid/business-funding/grant-programs/american-schools-and-hospitals-abroad/regional-overviews
