= Mahmoud Ahmadinejad and the Iran hostage crisis =

Some former hostages have identified the man in the military jacket on the hostage's left as Ahmadinejad. Other sources, including Ahmadinejad and other hostage takers have disputed this identification.

On June 29, 2005, shortly after Mahmoud Ahmadinejad won the Iranian presidential election, several major news outlets publicized allegations that he played the role of a captor during the 1979–1981 Iran hostage crisis. These allegations were eventually found to be unfounded and untrue.

Ahmadinejad and his political supporters have denied these allegations. Even his political opponents in Iran have specifically denied the allegations.

On June 30, 2005, US President George W. Bush declared that these charges were serious.

The United States Department of Homeland Security initially found Ahmadinejad ineligible for a visa to enter the US, citing "reason to believe" that he was involved in the seizure. The US Department of State interviewed hostages about their experiences.

A later CIA investigation determined "with relative certainty" that he was not involved in the takeover. Another US official said of the report that there was "no evidence" that he was among the captors.

== Alleged participation in the planning and leadership of the embassy takeover ==
Masoumeh Ebtekar, a spokeswoman for the hostage takers who was nicknamed "Sister Mary" by U.S. media during the crisis, said Ahmadinejad had actually been opposed to the takeover of the embassy. Ahmadinejad has also said that he did not support the embassy takeover until Ayatollah Ruhollah Khomeini endorsed it. The endorsement came late on November 4, 1979, the day the embassy was seized. Reportedly, Ahmadinejad argued that the protest ought to be directed at the Soviet embassy instead, and al-Jazeera reported that when OSU leaders planned the attack on the US embassy in 1979, Ahmadinejad actually proposed simultaneous action against the Soviet embassy.

Abolhassan Banisadr, the exiled former President of Iran stated that Ahmadinejad's job on the hostage holding team was to act as direct liaison reporting to Ayatollah Khomeini the status of the hostages. Bani-Sadr also reported that the photograph identified as Ahmadinejad was another agitator who was later imprisoned by Rafsanjani and committed suicide while in prison.

== Rejection by the CIA ==
CNN has reported from multiple official sources the result of a CIA investigation into whether Ahmedinejad was involved in the hostage taking:

A CIA report has determined with "relative certainty" that Iran's new president, Mahmoud Ahmadinejad, was not involved in the taking of U.S. hostages 26 years ago, three government officials told CNN ... Another U.S. official said the tone of the report is that there is no evidence to date that the new Iranian president was among those who held U.S. diplomats hostage.

The CNN report continues stating that "CIA analysis of a photograph of one of the hostage-takers determined that the man was not Ahmadinejad."

== Identification by some former hostages ==
Several former hostages allege that during the 1979 Iran hostage crisis Ahmadinejad was one of the key individuals holding Americans inside the embassy.

A former Iranian secret agent said that the allegations were untrue: "I'm opposed to Ahmadinejad's policies and thinking but he was not involved in the hostage drama nor in the assassination of an Iranian opposition Kurdish leader in Vienna." A classified CIA report says the claim is not proven.

Five former U.S. hostages, Dr. William Daugherty (who worked for the CIA in Iran), Kevin Hermening, David Roeder, US Army Col. Charles Scott, and US Navy Capt. Donald Sharer have alleged that Ahmadinejad was one of the leaders of the Iran Hostage Crisis at the U.S. embassy in Tehran, during their 444-day captivity starting on November 4, 1979. All of the above-mentioned hostages have identified Ahmadinejad as one of the people involved, while Ahmadinejad denies his involvement.

Col. Charles Scott, now seventy-three, recently told the Washington Times that "He was one of the top two or three leaders; the new president of Iran is a terrorist." Col. Scott claimed to recall an incident when Ahmadinejad berated a friendly Iranian guard who had allowed the two Americans to visit another U.S. hostage in a neighboring cell. Col. Scott, who understands Persian, said Ahmadinejad told the guard: "You shouldn't let these pigs out of their cells". Donald Sharer, a retired Navy captain who was for a time a cellmate of Col. Scott at the Evin prison in northern Tehran, remembered Ahmadinejad as "a hard-liner, a cruel individual". "I know he was an interrogator", said Capt. Sharer, now 64. Former hostages William Daugherty and Kevin Hermening also claim he was involved.

Scott and Roeder have also expressed certainty that Ahmadinejad was present at their interrogations. Scott asserted that "This is the guy. There's no question about it. You could make him a blond and shave his whiskers, put him in a zoot suit and I'd still spot him." Both men, along with Sharer and Hermening, have stated their recollections of Ahmadinejad as an "extremely cruel" ringleader. Of the above men, only Hermening has expressed that he was not immediately sure that Ahmadinejad was involved in the Hostage Crisis.

However, former hostages USAF Col. Thomas E. Schaefer, Paul Lewis (a former Marine embassy guard), and Barry Rosen (former embassy press attache) have expressed uncertainty regarding whether Ahmadinejad was actually involved. Schaefer stated that he does not recall Ahmadinejad by face or name, and Lewis expressed noticing a vague familiarity upon seeing Ahmadinejad's picture, but said that he could not be sure if Ahmadinejad was actually the same person as his captor. "My memories were more of the gun barrel, not the people behind it," stated Lewis. Rosen, while not claiming to personally recognize Ahmadinejad, professes to believe those who do claim to recognize the new Iranian President-elect. "When you're in a situation like that… it doesn't go away" Rosen stated.

In a September, 2005 interview of Ray Takeyh, a senior fellow on the Washington-based Council on Foreign Relations, discussed his opinions on the above allegations, stating:

There is no evidence to suggest that Ahmadinejad was one of the captors during the 1979 hostage-taking at the U.S. embassy in Tehran; the CIA itself has suggested he was not part of it. But here you get into a tricky position because the Bush administration is unwilling to contradict the American hostages. Five of the hostages have claimed that Ahmadinejad was one of their captors. The CIA, after a laborious investigation, has not accepted that claim. But politically, it's difficult for the Bush administration to take a position different from those who suffered 444 days of captivity.

== Identification by former Iranian President Bani Sadr ==
Former Iranian president Abolhassan Banisadr claimed that Ahmadinejad was among those inside the Embassy but was not a decision maker. According to Banisadr, Ahmadinejad was not only present in the occupied compound, but served as liaison between the hostage-takers and Ali Khamenei, the Friday prayer leader of Tehran at that time. He claimed that Ayatollah Khamenei himself, who served as Iran’s Supreme Leader from 1989 to 2026, visited the hostage-takers repeatedly in the compound. Bani-Sadr also claimed that Ahmadinejad was initially opposed to the hostage-taking but once Khomeini gave his agreement, he changed his mind.

== Rejection by former hostage takers ==
Many of the former hostage takers have stated that Ahmadinejad was in no way involved in the Hostage Crisis. Bijan Abidi, one of the hostage takers, said that "There was no one by that name (Ahmadinejad) among the students who took part in the U.S. Embassy seizure." Mohsen Mirdamadi, one of the student leaders, and Masoumeh Ebtekar, the spokeswoman of the students who later became a Vice President under President Khatami, have also denied Ahmadinejad's involvement. Abbas Abdi, another leader of the embassy takeover, and subsequently a political opponent of Ahmadinejad, expressed certainty that Ahmadinejad was not involved. "Definitely he was not among the students who took part in the seizure," Abdi said. "He was not part of us. He played no role in the seizure, let alone being responsible for security [for the students]." Rosen has stated that Abdi lacks credibility on this issue. Rosen reported that Abdi told him personally during a 1998 meeting in Paris that Abdi, while heavily involved in the embassy takeover, was never actually inside the embassy building. "So he can't maintain that [Ahmadinejad] was or wasn't," Rosen stated.

== The Iran Focus photograph controversy ==
Iran Focus originally claimed that they had obtained a photograph of a younger Ahmadinejad with a hostage, which was quickly published by the major Western news agencies AP, Reuters, and AFP. Publication of the photograph drew criticism because it was presented to the world without due investigation or verification.

Associated Press and other sources reported that the person in the photograph is a student named Taghi Mohammadi, who was a militant who later turned into a dissident. He was arrested for being connected to the MKO and was involved in the assassinations of President Mohammad Ali Rajai and Prime Minister Mohammad Javad Bahonar. He committed suicide in jail.
