= Muslim Student Followers of the Imam's Line =

Iranian group that led the 1979–1981 Iran hostage crisis

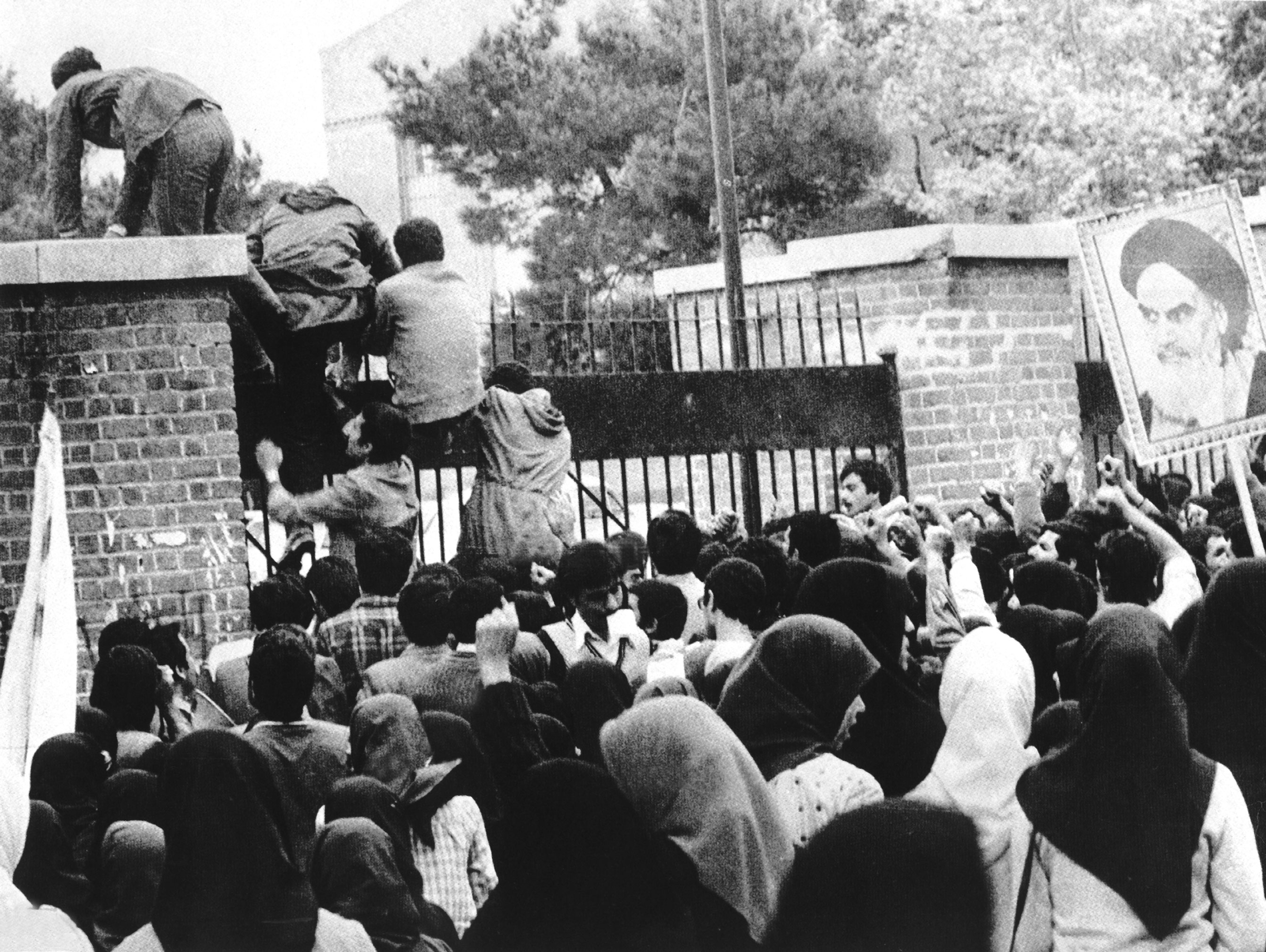
Iranian students storming the U. S. Embassy

The Muslim Student Followers of the Imam's Line (Persian: دانشجویان مسلمان پیرو خط امام, romanized: Dânešjuyân-e Mosalmân-e peyro-e Khatt-e Emâm; Arabic: الطلاب المسلمون السائرون على نهج الإمام, romanized: Altulaab Almuslimun Alsaayirun Ealaa Nahj Al'iimam), also called the Muslim Students of the Imam Khomeini Line, was an Iranian student group that occupied the U.S. embassy in Tehran on 4 November 1979. The students were supporters of the Islamic Revolution who occupied the embassy to show their support for Ayatollah Khomeini and their outrage that the ex-Shah of Iran was admitted to the United States for cancer treatment, instead of being returned to Iran for trial and execution. The occupation triggered the Iran hostage crisis where 52 American diplomats and citizens were held hostage for 444 days.

== History ==
The organization was a group comprising students from several major science and technology universities of Tehran, including the University of Tehran, Sharif University of Technology, and Tehran Polytechnic.

Time reported in December 1979 that there was "general agreement among Iranians and Western diplomatic sources that the 200 or so young men and women who are always inside the embassy compound are indeed legitimate students", although many Americans suspected otherwise. Time explained that television images taken outside the embassy show "armed men ... in dark green fatigues" who "look more like combat soldiers", but identified these men as members of the Pasdaran, the Islamic Revolutionary Guard Corps.

Amongst the students were Ebrahim Asgharzadeh, who concocted the original idea to seize the American embassy in September 1979, Mohsen Mirdamadi, Habibolah Bitaraf, and Masumeh Ebtekar, who was the group's spokesperson during the embassy hostage-taking and later became the Vice President of Iran For Women and Family Affairs.

Their name refers to the Imam, that is, the leader of Iran, Ayatollah Ruhollah Khomeini, who was not informed of the occupation of the embassy in advance, but later supported and confirmed the action. Information from other sources suggests Ayatollah Khomeini not only knew of the plans ahead of time, but approved them as well.

The group found political identity and social reinforcement in the revolutionary atmosphere, and because of the embassy action, the overall position of the supporters of Ayatollah Ruhollah Khomeini was strengthened in comparison with leftist groups.
