= Patricia Taylor =

Canadian microbiologist (1929–2024)

Patricia Taylor CM
- Born: Patricia Elsie Lee; March 20, 1929; Ayr, Queensland, Australia
- Died: September 9, 2024 (aged 95); Ottawa, Ontario, Canada
- Occupations: Microbiologist, research scientist
- Known for: Role in the Canadian Caper and contributions to medical research on tropical diseases and viral infections
- Spouse: Kenneth D. Taylor (m. 1960; died 2015)
- Children: 1

Patricia Elsie Taylor CM (née Lee; March 20, 1929 – September 9, 2024) was an Australian-born Canadian microbiologist and virologist best-known for her role in the Canadian Caper during the 1979 Iranian revolution. As a scientist, she published over 100 scientific papers on tropical diseases, viral infections and the HIV/AIDS epidemic. Taylor was appointed to the Order of Canada for her efforts in aiding six American diplomats to escape Iran during the Iran hostage crisis along with her diplomat husband Kenneth D. Taylor, who was then the Canadian ambassador to Iran.

== Early life ==
Taylor was born Patricia Elsie Lee on March 20, 1929, in Ayr, Queensland, Australia, to Mayzie Kwong Sue Duk and Ernest Howard Lee Hang Gong, in a Chinese immigrant family. She was sixth in the family of eleven children and was raised in the town of Townsville. Lee worked in the family's grocery store while continuing to pursue music and ballet. She completed her undergraduate and postgraduate degrees in science at the University of Queensland, where she studied under Australian virologist and microbiologist Macfarlane Burnet. She later went to the United States and obtained a PhD from the University of California, Berkeley. Her research during this time focused on studying the relation between malnutrition and inflammatory responses.

== Career ==
=== Microbiologist ===
Taylor began her research career at Berkeley where she studied encephalitis and the impact of malnutrition on immune response. She later shifted her research focus to the study of tropical diseases and viral infections. She held multiple teaching positions at institutions including the Queensland Institute of Medical Research and the London School of Hygiene & Tropical Medicine. As she accompanied her husband to multiple diplomatic postings, she continued her research on infectious diseases at multiple institutions in these countries at a time when it was not allowed for diplomats' spouses to work. Some of the institutions at which she did her research during this period included the Institute of Nutrition for Central America and Panama in Guatemala, Pasteur Institute of Iran and the Iranian National Blood Transfusion Service in Tehran, Iran.

When Taylor returned to New York, she worked in the front lines of the then emerging HIV/AIDS epidemic working with the New York Blood Center's Lindsley F. Kimball Research Institute. Her work during this period contributed to the understanding of viral infections and specifically of HIV/AIDS when the medical community was still coming to terms with the complexity of the disease.

Taylor was a recipient of fellowships including the Fulbright scholarship and the Rockefeller fellowship. Through her career, she published over 100 scientific papers, which were published in journals including The New England Journal of Medicine, Journal of the American Medical Association, and the American Journal of Epidemiology.

=== Role in the Canadian Caper ===
Taylor is known for her actions in the Canadian Caper, a covert operation that helped six American diplomats escape Iran during the Iranian hostage crisis during the Iranian Revolution in 1979. When the U.S. Embassy in Tehran was stormed by militants, leading to the capture of 53 Americans, six diplomats managed to avoid capture and sought refuge at the Canadian embassy. Taylor, alongside her husband, then the Canadian Ambassador to Iran, hid the diplomats in their home for over two months disguising them as Canadian tourists.

Taylor not only helped keep the diplomats' presence a secret but also participated in the plan to smuggle them out of the country using false Canadian passports. The operation, devised with assistance from the CIA, succeeded in getting the Americans out of Iran in January 1980. The event later became the subject of multiple films, including the Academy Award–winning Argo (2012).

Taylor was made a member of the Order of Canada in 1981. The citation called out her work as a research microbiologist and her role in the Iranian crisis and efforts in aiding the escape of six American diplomats from that country. In 1992, Taylor was named Woman of the Year by the Canadian Women's Club in New York.

== Personal life ==
Taylor was married to Canadian diplomat Kenneth D. Taylor, whom she met while studying at the University of California, Berkeley where they were both members of the International House. The couple was married in 1960 and went on to have a son. Her husband predeceased her in 2015. She returned to Canada, settling in Ottawa, Ontario, after her husband's death.

Taylor was also a violinist and ballet dancer. She performed with various orchestras and ballet companies, including the Queensland Ballet Theatre where she was the principal ballet dancer, the California Symphony Orchestra, and the Guatemalan National Conservatory Chamber Music Group.

Taylor died at a retirement home in Ottawa, on September 9, 2024, at the age of 95.

== Select published works ==
=== Viral infections and vaccines ===
- Stevens, Cladd E.; Taylor, Patricia E.; Tong, Myron J.; Toy, Pearl T.; Vyas, Girish N.; Nair, Prem V.; Weissman, Joy Y.; Krugman, Saul (May 15, 1987). "Yeast-Recombinant Hepatitis B Vaccine: Efficacy With Hepatitis B Immune Globulin in Prevention of Perinatal Hepatitis B Virus Transmission". JAMA. 257 (19): 2612–2616. doi:10.1001/jama.1987.03390190090026. ISSN 0098-7484. PMID 2952812.
- Nainan, Omana V.; Khristova, Marina L.; Byun, KwanSoo; Xia, Guoliang; Taylor, Patricia E.; Stevens, Cladd E.; Margolis, Harold S. (2002). "Genetic variation of hepatitis B surface antigen coding region among infants with chronic hepatitis B virus infection". Journal of Medical Virology. 68 (3): 319–327. doi:10.1002/jmv.10206. ISSN 0146-6615. PMID 12226817.
- Stevens, Cladd E.; Toy, Pearl T.; Taylor, Patricia E.; Lee, Thomas; Yip, Hoo-Yi (1992). "Prospects for Control of Hepatitis B Virus Infection: Implications of Childhood Vaccination and Long-term Protection". Pediatrics. 90 (1): 170–173. doi:10.1542/peds.90.1.170. ISSN 0031-4005. PMID 1534885.
- Stevens, Cladd E.; Toy, Pearl T.; Tong, Myron J.; Taylor, Patricia E.; Vyas, Girish N.; Nair, Prem V.; Gudavalli, Madhu; Krugman, Saul (March 22, 1985). "Perinatal Hepatitis B Virus Transmission in the United States: Prevention by Passive-Active Immunization". JAMA. 253 (12): 1740–1745. doi:10.1001/jama.1985.03350360066020. ISSN 0098-7484. PMID 3974052.
- Stevens, Cladd E.; Alter, Harvey J.; Taylor, Patricia E.; Zang, Edith A.; Harley, Edward J.; Szmuness, Wolf; the Dialysis Vaccine Trial Study Group (August 23, 1984). "Hepatitis B Vaccine in Patients Receiving Hemodialysis: Immunogenicity and Efficacy". New England Journal of Medicine. 311 (8): 496–501. doi:10.1056/NEJM198408233110803. ISSN 0028-4793. PMID 6235453.
- Aach, Richard D.; Stevens, Cladd E.; Hollinger, F. Blaine; Mosley, James W.; Peterson, David A.; Taylor, Patricia E.; Johnson, Rhonda G.; Barbosa, Luiz H.; Nemo, George J. (November 7, 1991). "Hepatitis C Virus Infection in Post-Transfusion Hepatitis: An Analysis with First- and Second-Generation Assays". New England Journal of Medicine. 325 (19): 1325–1329. doi:10.1056/NEJM199111073251901. ISSN 0028-4793. PMID 1656258.

=== HIV / AIDS studies ===
- Stevens, Cladd E.; Taylor, Patricia E.; Zang, Edith A.; Morrison, John M.; Harley, Edward J.; de Cordoba, Santiago Rodriguez; Bacino, Carlos; Ting, Robert C. Y.; Bodner, Anne J.; Sarngadharan, M. G.; Gallo, Robert C.; Rubinstein, Pablo (1986). "Human T-Cell Lymphotropic Virus Type III Infection in a Cohort of Homosexual Men in New York City". JAMA. 255 (16): 2167–2172. doi:10.1001/jama.1986.03370160065028. ISSN 0098-7484. PMID 3007789.
- Koblin, B. A.; Hessol, N. A.; Zauber, A. G.; Taylor, P. E.; Buchbinder, S. P.; Katz, M. H.; Stevens, C. E. (1996). "Increased Incidence of Cancer among Homosexual Men, New York City and San Francisco, 1978-1990". American Journal of Epidemiology. 144 (10): 916–923. doi:10.1093/oxfordjournals.aje.a008861. ISSN 0002-9262. PMID 8916502.
- Gleaves, Curt A.; Welle, John; Campbell, Mary; Elbeik, Tarek; Ng, Valerie; Taylor, Patricia E.; Kuramoto, Ken; Aceituno, Sherri; Lewalski, Eva; Joppa, Barbara; Sawyer, Lynette; Schaper, Carl; McNairn, Denise; Quinn, Thomas (2002). "Multicenter evaluation of the Bayer VERSANT™ HIV-1 RNA 3.0 assay: analytical and clinical performance". Journal of Clinical Virology. 25 (2): 205–216. doi:10.1016/S1386-6532(02)00011-2. ISSN 1386-6532. PMID 12367656.
- Saksela, Kalle (November 1, 1995). "HIV-1 Messenger RNA in Peripheral Blood Mononuclear Cells as an Early Marker of Risk for Progression to AIDS". Annals of Internal Medicine. 123 (9): 641–648. doi:10.7326/0003-4819-123-9-199511010-00001. ISSN 0003-4819. PMID 7574218.

=== Blood programs ===
- Rubinstein, Pablo; Carrier, Carmelita; Scaradavou, Andromachi; Kurtzberg, Joanne; Adamson, John; Migliaccio, Anna Ritá; Berkowitz, Richard L.; Cabbad, Michael; Dobrila, N. Ludy; Taylor, Patricia E.; Rosenfield, Richard E.; Stevens, Cladd E. (1998). "Outcomes among 562 Recipients of Placental-Blood Transplants from Unrelated Donors". New England Journal of Medicine. 339 (22): 1565–1577. doi:10.1056/NEJM199811263392201. ISSN 0028-4793. PMID 9828244.
- Rubinstein, P; Taylor, P E; Scaradavou, A; Adamson, J W; Migliaccio, G; Emanuel, D; Berkowitz, R L; Alvarez, E; Stevens, C E (January 1, 1994). "Unrelated placental blood for bone marrow reconstitution: organization of the placental blood program". Blood Cells. 20 (2–3): 587–96, discussion 596–600. ISSN 0340-4684. PMID 7749124.
- Szmuness, Wolf; Stevens, Cladd E.; Harley, Edward J.; Zang, Edith A.; Alter, Harvey J.; Taylor, Patricia E.; DE Vera, Anita; Chen, George T. S.; Kellner, Aaron; the Dialysis Vaccine Trial Study Group (December 9, 1982). "Hepatitis B Vaccine in Medical Staff of Hemodialysis Units: Efficacy and Subtype Cross-Protection". New England Journal of Medicine. 307 (24): 1481–1486. doi:10.1056/NEJM198212093072403. ISSN 0028-4793. PMID 6755247.
- Stevens, Cladd E.; Taylor, Patricia E.; Pindyck, Johanna; Choo, Qui-Lim; Bradley, Daniel W.; Kuo, George; Houghton, Michael (January 5, 1990). "Epidemiology of Hepatitis C Virus: A Preliminary Study in Volunteer Blood Donors". JAMA. 263 (1): 49–53. doi:10.1001/jama.1990.03440010047028. ISSN 0098-7484. PMID 2104548.
- Rubinstein, P; Dobrila, L; Rosenfield, R E; Adamson, J W; Migliaccio, G; Migliaccio, A R; Taylor, P E; Stevens, C E (October 24, 1995). "Processing and cryopreservation of placental/umbilical cord blood for unrelated bone marrow reconstitution". Proceedings of the National Academy of Sciences. 92 (22): 10119–10122. Bibcode:1995PNAS...9210119R. doi:10.1073/pnas.92.22.10119. ISSN 0027-8424. PMC 40747. PMID 7479737.

== Media ==
- Chinese-American actress Tisa Chang portrayed her character in the 1981 Canadian-American television film, Escape from Iran: The Canadian Caper
- American actress Page Leong portrayed her character in the 2012 Academy Award–winning film Argo
