= Antonio Tobias Mendez =

American sculptor (born 1963)

- Born: 1963 (age 62–63); Denver, Colorado
- Occupation: Sculptor
- Parent(s): Tony Mendez; Karen Mendez

Antonio Tobias Mendez (born 1963) is an American sculptor.

== Works ==
Mendez has produced over twenty public monuments: his sculptures include Thurgood Marshall, Don Shula, Mohandas Gandhi, Major Taylor, and part of the United States Navy Memorial. In 2011, Mendez was nominated as one of the three finalists to complete the Bill Russell statue in the city of Boston at the City Hall Plaza. He also created bronze sculptures of the six Baltimore Orioles greats whose uniform numbers were retired by the ballclub, which are located in the picnic area behind the bullpens beyond left-center field at Camden Yards. In 2016, Mendez sculpted a bust of frontiersman Davy Crockett for the Tennessee State Capitol.

== Personal life ==
Toby Mendez is the son of author and former CIA operative Tony Mendez and half-brother of Jesse Mendez, son of Tony and Jonna Mendez (herself former CIA Chief of Disguise).
