= Honorary appointments to the Order of Canada =

Five honorary appointments to the Order of Canada are permitted per year by the order's constitution. The following is a list of all honorary appointments to date. Names rendered in italics were later made Canadian citizens; these memberships thereby became regarded no longer as honorary but instead as substantive.

| # | Name | Citizenship | Appointment | Investiture | Death/removal | Occupation/field of endeavour |
|---|---|---|---|---|---|---|
Companions
| 5. | Nelson Rolihlahla Mandela | (South Africa) (Note: Nelson Mandela was granted Honorary Canadian Citizenship in 2001. However, this is ceremonial and does not make his appointment substantive.) | 3 September 1998 | 24 September 1998 | 5 December 2013 | Former President of South Africa. |
| 6. | Queen Elizabeth The Queen Mother | (Note: The Queen Mother, as a member of the Canadian Royal Family, was a Canadian subject but not a Canadian citizen.) | 1 August 2000 | 31 October 2000 | 30 March 2002 | Former Royal Consort of Canada. |
| 9. | Frank Gehry | (United States) (Note: Gehry, though born in Toronto, moved with his family to the United States in 1942, before the enactment of the Canadian Citizenship Act, 1946. However, Gehry was granted Canadian citizenship in 2002, and is now no longer listed as an honorary Companion of the order.) | 12 November 2002 | 16 June 2003 | 5 Dec 2025 | Architect. |
| 10. | Boutros Boutros-Ghali | (Egypt) (United Nations) | 8 May 2003 | 7 May 2004 | 16 February 2016 | Former Secretary-General of the United Nations. |
| 11. | Václav Havel | (Czech Republic) | 8 May 2003 | 3 March 2004 | 18 December 2011 | Former President of the Czech Republic. |
| 12. | Aga Khan IV | (Switzerland) (France) (United Kingdom) (Note: The Aga Khan was granted Honorary Canadian Citizenship in 2011. However, this is ceremonial and does not make his appointment substantive) | 29 October 2004 | 6 June 2005 | 4 February 2025 | Imam of the Shia Imami Ismaili Muslims. |
Officers
| 2. | John Kenneth Galbraith | (United States) (Note: Galbraith was born in Ontario before the establishment of Canadian citizenship and renounced his status as a British subject in 1937 to become a United States citizen.) | 17 April 1997 | 5 November 1997 | 29 April 2006 | Economist. |
| 3. | James Hillier | (United States) (Note: Hillier was born in Ontario before the establishment of Canadian citizenship and renounced his status as a British subject in 1945 to become a United States citizen.) | 17 April 1997 | 5 November 1997 | 15 January 2007 | Inventor of the electron microscope. |
| 4. | Charles Dutoit | (Switzerland) | 23 October 1997 | 30 January 2002 | | Conductor of the Montreal Symphony Orchestra. |
| 8. | Tanya Moiseiwitsch | (United Kingdom) | 10 October 2002 | 16 May 2003 | 19 February 2003 | Theatre designer for the Stratford Festival. |
| 15. | Charles Aznavour | (France) (Note: In December 2008 Aznavour was granted Armenian Citizenship by Presidential decree) | 10 April 2008 | 5 July 2008 | 1 October 2018 | Musician and actor. |
| 16. | Bernard Pivot | (France) | 10 April 2008 | 7 May 2008 | 6 May 2024 | Television host and culture promoter. |
| 18. | Sima Samar | (Afghanistan) | 25 May 2009 | 17 November 2010 | | Human rights leader. |
| 19. | Ronnie Hawkins | (United States) | 29 June 2013 | 7 May 2014 | 29 May 2022 | Rock Musician |
| 20. | Bramwell Tovey | (United Kingdom) | 29 June 2013 | 21 November 2014 | 12 July 2022 | Conductor and composer |
| 22. | Michael Schade | (Germany) | 30 Dec 2016 | 25 August 2017 | | Opera singer |
| 25. | Marie Ann Battiste | (United States) | 27 June 2019 | 6 May 2022 | | Indigenous rights activist and language educator |
| 28. | Richard Wayne Hill Sr. | (United States) | 28 December 2023 | | | Indigenous arts activist |
| 29. | Kent Nagano | (United States) | 27 June 2024 | | | Opera conductor and administrator |
| 30. | Vaira Vīķe-Freiberga | (Latvia) (Note: Vaira Vike-Freiberga was born in Latvia in 1937 and emigrated to Canada as a refugee in 1954 where she later became a naturalized Canadian Citizen. The Constitution of Latvia prohibits the President from holding dual citizenship and Vike-Freiberga consequently renounced her Canadian citizenship upon her election in 1999.) | 27 June 2024 | | | Former President of Latvia |
Members
| 1. | Zena Sheardown | (Guyana) (Note: Zena Sheardown was the wife of John Sheardown, a Canadian employed at the Canadian Embassy in Iran during the Iranian Revolution of 1979. At great risk to her personal safety, Zena Sheardown was instrumental in the success of the Canadian Caper, allowing six American diplomats to be safely removed from the country. Sheardown was the first honorary appointment to the Order of Canada; the uniqueness of this appointment made it slow, to the point that Flora MacDonald had to ask for and receive unanimous consent from the House of Commons of Canada before the appointment was seriously considered. By the time she was invested into the order in 1986, Sheardown had become a Canadian citizen and the Advisory Council changed the status of her induction from honorary to substantive.) | 11 October 1981 | 29 December 1986 | | Instrumental participant during the Canadian Caper. |
| 7. | Lois Lilienstein | (United States) | 1 May 2002 | 24 October 2003 | 22 April 2015 | Member of Sharon, Lois & Bram. |
| 13. | Francis Cabot | (United States) | 29 June 2005 | 9 September 2005 | 19 November 2011 | Horticulturist. |
| 14. | Salome Bey | (United States) | 17 November 2005 | 26 October 2006 | 9 August 2020 | Musician. |
| 17. | Zachary Richard | (United States) | 25 May 2009 | 7 April 2010 | | Singer, songwriter, and poet. |
| 21. | Johann Olav Koss | (Norway) | 1 July 2015 | 13 May 2016 | | Olympic speedskater and founder of Right to Play. |
| 23. | Kathy Reichs | (United States) | 27 Dec 2018 | 18 Nov 2019 | | Forensic Anthropologist and crime fiction writer. |
| 24. | Richard J. Schmeelk | (United States) | 27 Dec 2018 | 4 Sep 2019 | 19 May 2022 | Banker and Philanthropist, Founder of the Richard J. Schmeelk Canada Fellowship . |
| 26. | Alfred E. Slinkard | (United States) (Note: Born in Rockford, Washington in 1931, Dr. Alfred Eugene Slinkard moved to Canada in 1972 to joined the University of Saskatchewan's Crop Development Centre with a goal of diversifying Western Canada's agriculture sector away from wheat. In this role Dr. Slinkard developed the Laird and Eston variety of Lentils in the 1970s and 80s. Laird grew to become one of the most recognized lentils in the world and made Canada one of the largest suppliers of Lentils and other pulse crops to the world market.) | 27 Nov 2020 | 13 April 2022 | 24 Nov 2022 | Plant scientist and agronomic breeder. |
| 27. | Jackie Richardson | (United States) (Note: Born in Donora, Pennsylvania in 1947, Richardson moved to Canada in 1954.) | 29 Dec 2021 | | | Jazz singer and actress. |
| 31. | Brenda Okorogba | (Nigeria) (Note: Okorogba was born in Nigeria and as of 2026 was living in Ontario.) | 31 Dec 2025 | | | Community organizer and Educator. |
