= Jonna Mendez =

American CIA technical operations officer and writer

- Born: Jonna Hiestand; 1945 (age 80–81); Campbellsville, Kentucky, U.S.
- Education: Wichita State University (BA)
- Spouses: John Goeser; Tony Mendez (m. 1991; died 2019)
- Awards: Intelligence Commendation Medal (1993)
- Espionage activity
- Allegiance: United States
- Service years: 1966–1993

Jonna Mendez (née Hiestand; born 1945) is an American former technical operations officer, photo operations officer, and chief of disguise for the Central Intelligence Agency (CIA).

== Life and career ==
Jonna Hiestand was born in 1945 to a middle-class family in Campbellsville, Kentucky, the second of four girls. Her parents moved to Wichita, Kansas for her father's work as an airplane mechanic, and she graduated from high school in 1963. After attending Wichita State University, Hiestand moved to Frankfurt and worked for Chase Bank in Frankfurt, where she met John Goeser. Goeser was newly recruited to the CIA and, when he and Hiestand were married in 1966, he persuaded her to take employment with the agency so they would not have to be separated during his tours abroad.

Initially treated as a "CIA wife", she accompanied John on tours in Europe, the Far East, the Subcontinent, and at CIA headquarters in Washington D.C., working primarily as a secretary. She was reassigned in 1971 to the Office of Technical Service; unhappy with the limited duties allowed her, Mendez applied for a position as a technical support officer, specializing in clandestine photography. The role required her to work with foreign assets, learn agency tradecraft, and develop relationships with superiors - all of which would prove crucial to the development of her career in the decades to come.

In 1982, Mendez was qualified for field work after completing a rigorous months-long training regime but learned that she would not be promoted further in her current position on account of interagency resistance to professional women. To get around this, she was transferred to the CIA's disguise lab and underwent additional training to become a disguise technician, a role that required her to travel often and work closely with both CIA officers and assets in the field. She also gained experience managing logistics by having to procure disguise materials.

In 1986, Mendez was promoted to "denied area operations", a unit of experienced officers and technicians who oversaw field agents in countries such as the Soviet Union and Cuba that were heavily surveilled by rival intelligence services and where the risks to CIA personnel were greatest. Her performance in the role was considered exceptional, leading to selection in a program designed to train agency managers. Amid growing pressure on the CIA to place more women in higher ranks, Mendez was promoted to Deputy Chief in 1986.

The disguise lab was officially made a full division of the CIA by the end of the decade, and Mendez became its first female Chief in 1989. Her tenure saw a marked effort to develop a prosthetic mask that field agents could use to evade surveillance based on the pioneering work of CIA contractor John Chambers. With few women on staff, Mendez herself often served as a model for when female masks were field-tested.

A famous incident occurred when director William Webster asked Mendez to demonstrate her work to President George H.W. Bush at the White House in a bid to gain increased Congressional funding. Mendez had a custom mask made and styled in the guise of a younger woman and wore it while debriefing the President. When asked to provide the sample, Mendez simply removed her mask to the astonishment of those present, who had been unaware that she'd been in disguise the whole time.

In 1993, she retired and was awarded the CIA's Commendation Medal.

Jonna Hiestand Goeser met her future second husband, Tony Mendez, also a CIA officer, while assigned to Bangkok. Tony Mendez is widely known for overseeing the joint covert rescue mission "Canadian Caper" during the Iran hostage crisis in 1979, a story that served as inspiration for the 2012 movie Argo directed by Ben Affleck. Following Mendez's retirement in 1990, he and Jonna married in 1991. They had a son together.

== Later years ==
After retiring from the CIA in 1993, Mendez and her husband served on the board of directors for the International Spy Museum in Washington, D.C. They were both involved in the museum planning and design. She was one of the 51 former intelligence officers who signed the public statement on the Hunter Biden emails, which claimed that the scandal "has all the classic earmarks of a Russian information operation" .

In June 2023, Mendez was presented with the Daughters of the American Revolution's Patriot Award by President General Pamela Rouse Wright during National Defense Night at the 132nd Continental Congress at DAR Constitution Hall.

== Works ==
- Co-author Tony Mendez, Bruce Henderson; Spy Dust: Two Masters of Disguise Reveal the Tools and Operations that Helped Win the Cold War New York: Atria Books, 2003. ISBN 9780743428538, OCLC 54680464
- Co-author Antonio J Mendez; The Moscow Rules: the secret CIA tactics that helped America win the Cold War, New York: PublicAffairs, 2019. ISBN 9781541762190, OCLC 1078953368
- In a 2015 lecture, Jonna Mendez explained how Czechoslovak husband and wife KGB spies Karl Koecher and Hana Koecher used sex to infiltrate the CIA and gather top-secret information. One popular Washington, D.C., "swinger's club" frequented by the couple counted at least 10 CIA staffers and a United States senator as members.
