= Zena Sheardown =

Guyanese-Canadian woman

Zena Kahn Sheardown CM is a Guyanese-Canadian woman, who together with her husband John Sheardown, sheltered six Americans in their home for months during the Iran Hostage Crisis, in what has come to be known as "the Canadian Caper".

In 1980, Sheardown's husband was appointed to the Order of Canada for his role in the Canadian Caper; Sheardown was ineligible for appointment because she was not a Canadian citizen. Her husband campaigned for her appointment, and in 1981, Sheardown was awarded the first-ever honorary appointment to the Order of Canada.

By 1986, Sheardown had become a naturalized Canadian, and her honorary appointment was terminated, in exchange for an appointment as a full member. She thereby became the first person "removed" from the Order of Canada, although it is generally considered a transfer of status rather than a removal.

John and Zena Sheardown were portrayed in the 1981 Canadian-American television movie Escape from Iran: The Canadian Caper by Chris Wiggins and Diana Barrington, respectively. After the big-budget Hollywood movie Argo about the Canadian Caper was released in 2012, director Ben Affleck called to personally apologize to the Sheardowns for having to leave them out due to plot and time constraints, stating in a later interview, "It really did break my heart a bit."

== Bibliography ==
- McCreery, Christopher (2005). The Order of Canada: Its Origins, History, and Development. University of Toronto Press. p. 213. ISBN 0-8020-3940-5.
