= John Sheardown =

Canadian diplomat known for the Canadian Caper

John Vernon Sheardown CM (October 11, 1924 – December 30, 2012) was a Canadian diplomat who played a leading role in the "Canadian Caper". He and his wife Zena personally sheltered Americans hiding in Iran during the Iran hostage crisis.

== Early life ==
Sheardown was born on October 11, 1924, in Sandwich, Ontario (now Windsor, Ontario).

At the age of 18, he enlisted in the Royal Canadian Air Force and piloted an Avro Lancaster heavy bomber in World War II, surviving having to bail out over England returning from a mission. He remained in the military after the war and also served in Korea.

He later worked for the Canadian immigration service, beginning around 1962, then in the foreign service for 27 years, retiring in 1989.

== Canadian Caper ==
On November 4, 1979, the Iran hostage crisis began; 52 American diplomats and civilians were taken hostage by Iranians in Tehran. At the time, Sheardown was the chief immigration officer, the second-ranking official at the Canadian Embassy there.

A group of five Americans had escaped capture. After hiding for six days, one of them, Robert Anders, telephoned Sheardown, a friend he had played tennis with, for help. Sheardown immediately contacted his superior, Ambassador Ken Taylor, who apprised the Canadian government. Approval was quickly given. Sheardown and his wife Zena hid three of the Americans (Anders and married couple Cora Amburn-Lijek and Mark Lijek) in their rented 20-room home for 79 days at great personal risk, while Taylor sheltered two others (couple Joseph and Kathleen Stafford). On November 27, Taylor received a call from the Swedish ambassador Kaj Sundberg, asking him to take in American Lee Schatz. Schatz had been staying with a Swedish diplomat, but the Swedish ambassador felt he could better impersonate a Canadian. Taylor agreed, and placed Schatz in the Sheardown residence. The Sheardowns left Tehran days before the CIA smuggled the six Americans out of the country under fake Canadian passports on January 27, 1980.

For his part in the Canadian Caper, Sheardown was made a member of the Order of Canada. He lobbied for his wife, ineligible as a British citizen who had never lived in Canada, to be awarded the same honour, which she received in 1981 on an honorary basis through the intervention of Flora MacDonald. (She later became a full member after becoming a Canadian citizen.)

John and Zena Sheardown were portrayed in the 1981 Canadian-American television movie Escape from Iran: The Canadian Caper by Chris Wiggins and Diana Barrington, respectively. After the big-budget Hollywood movie Argo about the Canadian Caper was released in 2012, director Ben Affleck called to personally apologize to the Sheardowns for having to leave them out due to plot and time constraints, stating in a later interview, "It really did break my heart a bit."

== Personal life and death ==
Sheardown was married twice. He and his first wife, Kathleen Benson, divorced. He was married to his second wife, Zena Khan, from 1975 until his death in Ottawa on December 30, 2012. He had battled Alzheimer's disease and other ailments. He was also survived by two sons, Robin and John Jr.; daughter Jacqueline; and various grandchildren and great-grandchildren.
