= Kenneth D. Taylor =

Canadian diplomat (1934–2015)

Kenneth D. Taylor OC

12th Chancellor of Victoria University, Toronto
- In office 1998–2004
- President: Roseann Runte; Paul W. Gooch
- Preceded by: Sang Chul Lee
- Succeeded by: Norman Jewison

Her Majesty's Ambassador Extraordinary and Plenipotentiary of Canada to Iran
- In office September 1977 – January 1980
- Monarch: Elizabeth II
- Prime Minister: Pierre Trudeau (1977–79); Joe Clark (1979–80)

Personal details
- Born: Kenneth Douglas Taylor; October 5, 1934 Calgary, Alberta, Canada
- Died: October 15, 2015 (aged 81) New York City, New York, U.S.
- Spouse: Patricia Lee (m. 1960)
- Education: University of Toronto (BA); University of California, Berkeley (MBA)

Kenneth Douglas Taylor OC (October 5, 1934 – October 15, 2015) was a Canadian diplomat, educator and businessman, best known for his role in the 1979 covert operation called the "Canadian Caper" when he was the Canadian ambassador to Iran. With the cooperation of the American Central Intelligence Agency, Taylor helped six Americans escape from Iran during the Iran hostage crisis by procuring Canadian passports for the Americans to deceive the Iranian Revolutionary guard by posing as a Canadian film crew scouting locations. Before the escape, the six Americans spent several weeks hiding in the homes of Taylor and another Canadian diplomat, John Sheardown.

Taylor is portrayed by Gordon Pinsent in the Canadian 1981 television film, Escape from Iran: The Canadian Caper which dramatizes the cover story for the operation. The later 2012 American film, Argo, focuses more on the CIA and Hollywood's role, with Taylor played by Canadian actor Victor Garber.

After his death, The Washington Post described Taylor as the "main hero" of the Iran hostage escape "who orchestrated the entire process", quoting former president Jimmy Carter in doing so. In 1981, Taylor was awarded the Congressional Gold Medal by President Ronald Reagan. Nonetheless, the significance of his role was downplayed in the film Argo.

== Early life and education ==
Taylor was born in Calgary, Alberta. He completed his Bachelor of Arts degree at Victoria College at the University of Toronto and his Master of Business Administration degree at the University of California, Berkeley. He was a brother of the Sigma Chi fraternity and was later honoured with its highest award, Significant Sigma Chi.

== Iran hostage crisis ==
Iranian students invaded the United States embassy in Tehran on November 4, 1979. During the riot, six Americans managed to escape. They hid for four days before reaching the Canadian embassy, where they met Taylor, who devised the plan to get them out of Iran safely. On January 20, 1981, as Ronald Reagan was being sworn in as President, the remaining 52 American hostages were released by Iran into US custody, having spent 444 days in captivity.

Taylor played a crucial role in providing intelligence on the hostage crisis to Canadian and American intelligence agencies. Reportedly, he helped scout out landing sites for the abortive Delta Force rescue attempt, Operation Eagle Claw.

A made-for-TV movie of the events, Escape from Iran: The Canadian Caper, was produced in 1981. In 2012, Ben Affleck produced and starred in a movie titled Argo, which is based on the book The Master of Disguise by Tony Mendez, a CIA agent involved in the incident. After the film was previewed at the 2012 Toronto International Film Festival, criticism arose that the film unfairly minimized the participation of the Canadian government, and Taylor in particular, in the extraction operation. This included the addition to the film of several fictional events for dramatic reasons, as well as a postscript text indicating that the CIA let Taylor take the credit for political purposes, implying that he did not deserve the accolades he received. Affleck noted, "Because we say it's based on a true story, rather than this is a true story, we're allowed to take some dramatic license. There's a spirit of truth." However, Affleck did respond by changing the postscript text to read, "The involvement of the CIA complemented efforts of the Canadian embassy to free the six held in Tehran. To this day the story stands as an enduring model of international co-operation between governments." Historical news footage discussing Canada's role in the rescue was also added near the end of the film. Taylor himself said that the film was "fun, it's thrilling, it's pertinent, it's timely," but noted that "Canada was not merely standing around watching events take place. The CIA was a junior partner."

== Later life and death ==
After returning from Iran, Taylor was appointed Canadian Consul-General to New York City. In 1980, he was made an Officer of the Order of Canada along with his wife Pat and other Canadian personnel involved in the escape, and was also awarded the United States Congressional Gold Medal that same year. He also received the Golden Plate Award of the American Academy of Achievement in 1980.

He returned to the University of Toronto for several years as the Chancellor of Victoria College.

Taylor left the foreign service in 1984 and served as Senior Vice-President of Nabisco (RJR Nabisco after 1986) from 1984 to 1989.

Taylor moved to the United States and resided in New York City until his death at the age of 81 on October 15, 2015. Taylor died at NewYork–Presbyterian Hospital, where he had been treated for Stage 4 colon cancer. Taylor's funeral service was held at Timothy Eaton Memorial Church in Toronto on October 27, 2015. He was survived by his wife, Patricia, his son, Douglas, and two grandchildren, Tristan and Kassia.

== Notes and references ==
a. Taylor did not present credentials because of the Canadian government's decision to change residency and accreditation from Iran to Kuwait, with the opening of a Canadian Embassy in Kuwait.

Diplomatic posts
Preceded by Jim Sutcliffe Nutt	Commissioner to Bermuda; 1980–1981	Succeeded by Robert Johnstone
Preceded by James George	Ambassador Extraordinary and Plenipotentiary to Bahrain^{[a]} 1977–1979	Succeeded by Harry Stewart Hay
Preceded by James George	Ambassador Extraordinary and Plenipotentiary to the United Arab Emirates; 1977–1979	Succeeded by Harry Stewart Hay
Preceded by James George	Ambassador Extraordinary and Plenipotentiary to Qatar; 1977–1979	Succeeded by Harry Stewart Hay
Preceded by James George	Ambassador Extraordinary and Plenipotentiary to Oman; 1977–1979	Succeeded by William John Jenkins
Preceded by James George	Ambassador Extraordinary and Plenipotentiary to Kuwait; 1977–1979	Succeeded by Michael William Murison
Preceded by James George	Ambassador Extraordinary and Plenipotentiary to Iran; 1977–1979	Succeeded by Paul Dingledine
