= David Klawans =

American film producer (born 1968)

- Born: September 10, 1968 (age 57); Chicago, Illinois, U.S.
- Occupation: film producer

David Klawans (born September 10, 1968) is an American film producer. He was the executive producer of the movie Argo, winner of the Best Picture Oscar at the 85th Academy Awards.

== Early life and education ==
Klawans was born in Chicago. He was raised in Europe after his family moved to Belgium. He later returned to America and graduated from NYU's Tisch School of the Arts, where he was mentored by film producer David Brown.

He started his career as a production assistant for an LA-based Japanese television commercial company, and developed movie ideas in his spare time. In an interview with the Los Angeles Times, Klawans recalled how he was unable to afford a car, and rode to archives on a bicycle to research stories.

== Career ==
In 2002, Klawans discovered a true story about a Mexican priest who moonlighted as a Lucha Libre wrestler to raise money for his church orphanage. He developed the idea into the 2006 Jack Black comedy Nacho Libre, a film that grossed $99,255,460 worldwide.

In 2003, he produced the independent documentary Togbe, the true story of an unemployed white Dutchman who was believed to be the reincarnated king of the West African nation of Ghana. It aired on PBS and was screened at the United Nations.

Klawans has developed more than 30 feature projects at major studios, almost all based on true stories. The most notable example is Argo, a declassified true story Klawans discovered while reading the quarterly CIA journal 'Studies in Intelligence' in 1998. He then spent several years developing the project, which eventually became the 2012 Ben Affleck-directed movie, which grossed $230 million at the box office.

He co-developed the true story of the McDonald's Monopoly promotion fraud, which created one of the biggest bidding wars in Hollywood history for a single magazine article, according to the Hollywood Reporter. The project sold to Twentieth Century Fox in August 2018, with Matt Damon attached to star and Ben Affleck attached to direct.

== Miscellaneous ==
In 2007, Klawans was named by LA Weekly as one of Los Angeles' most interesting people in their annual 'Best of LA People' issue.
