= Pablo Rubinstein =

- Education: University of Chile
- Medical career
- Institutions: National Institutes of Health; Mount Sinai Hospital

Pablo Rubinstein is a pioneer (during the 1980s) in freezing of umbilical cord blood or placental blood cells for the use for unrelated donors to treat diseases like leukemia and genetic diseases such as Tay–Sachs disease and sickle cell anemia. He pioneered and established an international cord blood banking system and has played a leading role in international cord blood transplantation.

== Medical background ==
Earning his M.D. degree from the University of Chile in 1962, Rubinstein completed a surgical residency at Hospital Clínico José Joaquín Aguirre in Chile and completed a fellowship at M.I. Bassett Hospital at Columbia University. He also finished an international fellowship at the National Institutes of Health at Mount Sinai Hospital in New York City. He also taught as a professor at Universidad de Chile for four years.

== History of cord blood transplants ==
Following the first sibling-donor cord blood transplant in 1988, the National Institute of Health (NIH) awarded a grant to Rubinstein to develop the world's first cord blood program at the New York Blood Center, in order to establish the inventory of stem cell units necessary to provide unrelated, matched grafts for patients.

In 1993, Joanne Kurtzberg, Duke University Medical Center, performed the first two successful unrelated donor cord blood transplants; one of which cured acute lymphoblastic leukemia (ALL). As of 2006, more than 7,000 transplants from unrelated donors have been conducted on patients worldwide.

== National Cord Blood Program ==
Rubinstein is co-founder and director, of the National Cord Blood Program at the New York Blood Center. Along with his co-founder, Cladd Stevens, he and the program have enabled the inventory of umbilical cord blood units from ethnically diverse donors to grow, enabling it to serve the needs of patients across the world.

== Medical focus ==
Rubinstein specializes in immunogenetics, which encompasses the structure and function of genes that regulate immune responses, control the acceptance or rejection of tissue and organ transplants, and affect susceptibility to certain diseases.

He began in as an investigator at the Lindsley F. Kimball Research Institute at the NYBC, and serves as director of the Fred H. Allen Jr. Laboratory of Immunogenetics.

Rubinstein is also an adjunct clinical professor at Columbia University and is the author of more than 200 research papers on immunogenetics, cord blood banking and transplantation.

== Stem cell advocate ==
Rubinstein has testified to the United States Senate and House of Representatives on the importance of expanding funding stem cell research, and writes articles and papers on similar topics.
