= Escape from Iran: The Canadian Caper =

1981 Canadian-American television film

- Title card
- Genre: Drama; History; Thriller
- Written by: Lionel Chetwynd; Stanley Rubin
- Directed by: Lamont Johnson
- Music by: Peter Jermyn
- Countries of origin: Canada; United States
- Original language: English

Production
- Executive producer: Stanley Rubin
- Producers: Les Harris; Rob Iveson
- Production location: Toronto
- Cinematography: Albert J. Dunk
- Editors: Leslie Borden Brown; Jeff Warren
- Running time: 97 minutes
- Production companies: CTV Television Network; Canadian Film Development Corporation; Canamedia Productions; Stanley Rubin Productions

Original release
- Network: CBS
- Release: May 17, 1981

Escape from Iran: The Canadian Caper is a Canadian-American television film from 1981 about the "Canadian Caper" during the Iranian Revolution and hostage crises.

== Cast ==
- Gordon Pinsent as Kenneth D. Taylor, Ambassador of Canada
- Chris Wiggins as John Sheardown, Canadian diplomat
- Diana Barrington as Zena Sheardown
- Robert Joy as Mark Lijek, Consular office
- James B. Douglas as Bob Anders, Consular officer
- Tisa Chang as Pat Taylor, Kenneth Taylor's spouse
- Larry Aubrey as Joseph "Joe" Stafford, Consular officer
- Matsu Anderson as Cora Lijek, Consular assistant
- Julie Khaner as Kathy Stafford, Consular assistant
- Robert Lalonde as Jean Pelletier, Canadian journalist
- R.H. Thomson as Henry Lee Schatz, Agricultural attaché
- Carl Marotte as Sergeant Lopez, U.S Marine
- Jason Dean as Sergeant Gauthier, U.S Marine
- Jonathan Welsh as Michael Howland
- John-Peter Linton as Tomseth
- Barbara Gordon as Kathryn "Katie" Koob, Head of the Iranian-American cultural center
- Tom Berry as Kim King
- Hrant Alianak as Iranian Minister
- George Bloomfield as Sampson
- Maher Boutros as Siad
- Jack Blum as Louis LeClerc
- Leslie Carlson as Bruce Laingen (United States Chargé d'affaires)

== See also ==
- Argo (2012 film)
