= The Moscow rules =

Cold War-era safety precautions for spies

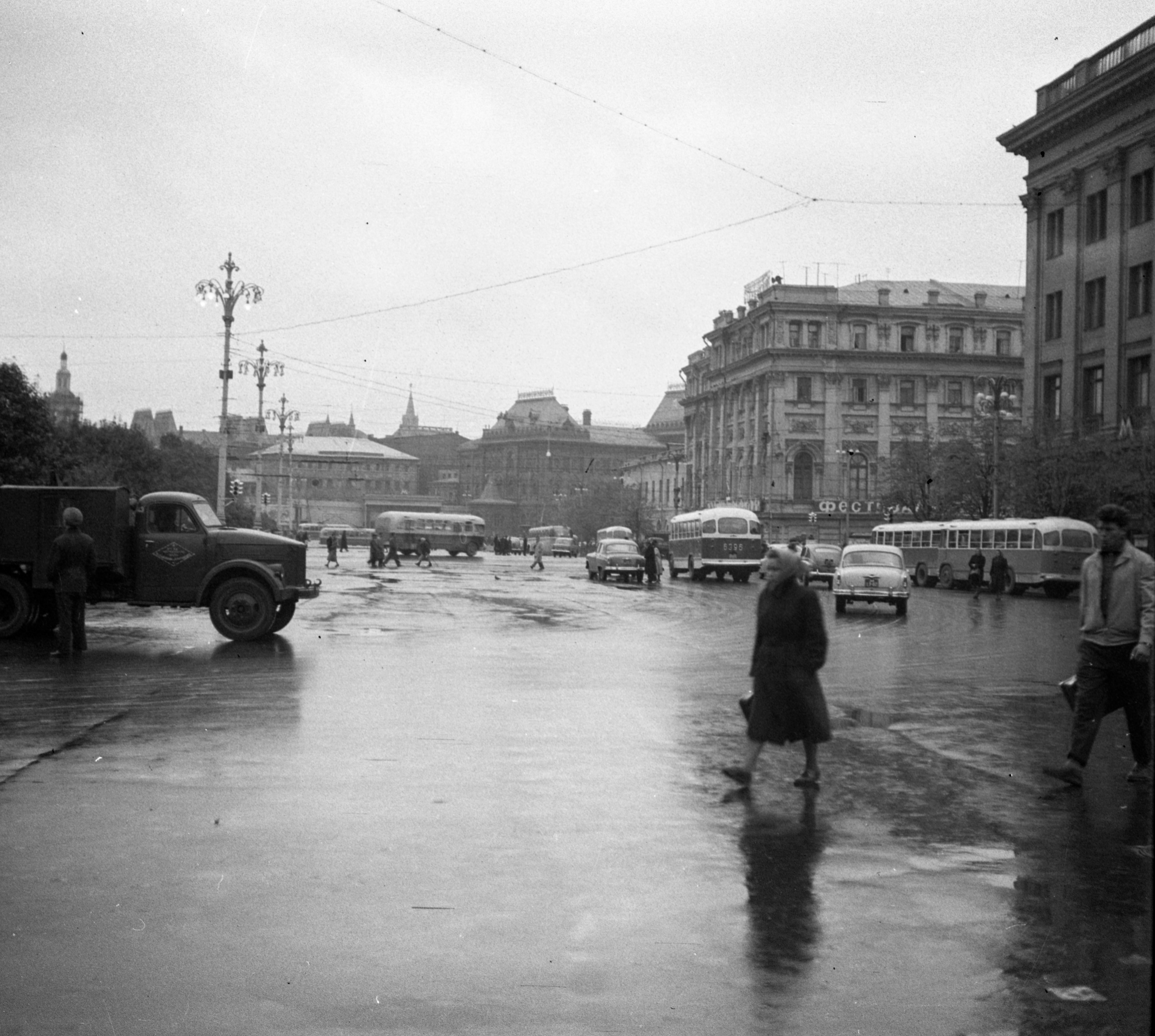
Moscow street scene, 1960

The Moscow rules are rules-of-thumb said to have been developed during the Cold War to be used by spies and others working in Moscow.

The rules are associated with Moscow because the city developed a reputation as being a particularly harsh locale for clandestine operatives who were exposed. The list may never have existed as written.

== The rules ==
CIA officer Tony Mendez wrote:

Although no one had written them down, they were the precepts we all understood for conducting operations in the most difficult of operating environments: the Soviet capital. By the time they got to Moscow, everyone knew these rules. They were dead simple and full of common sense.

In the International Spy Museum in Washington, D.C., the Moscow Rules are given as:

- Assume nothing.
- Never go against your gut.
- Everyone is potentially under opposition control.
- Do not look back; you are never completely alone.
- Go with the flow, blend in.
- Vary your pattern and stay within your cover.
- Lull them into a sense of complacency.
- Do not harass the opposition.
- Pick the time and place for action.
- Keep your options open.
