= Timeline of the Iranian hostage crisis =

Hostage situation in Iran, 1979 to 1981

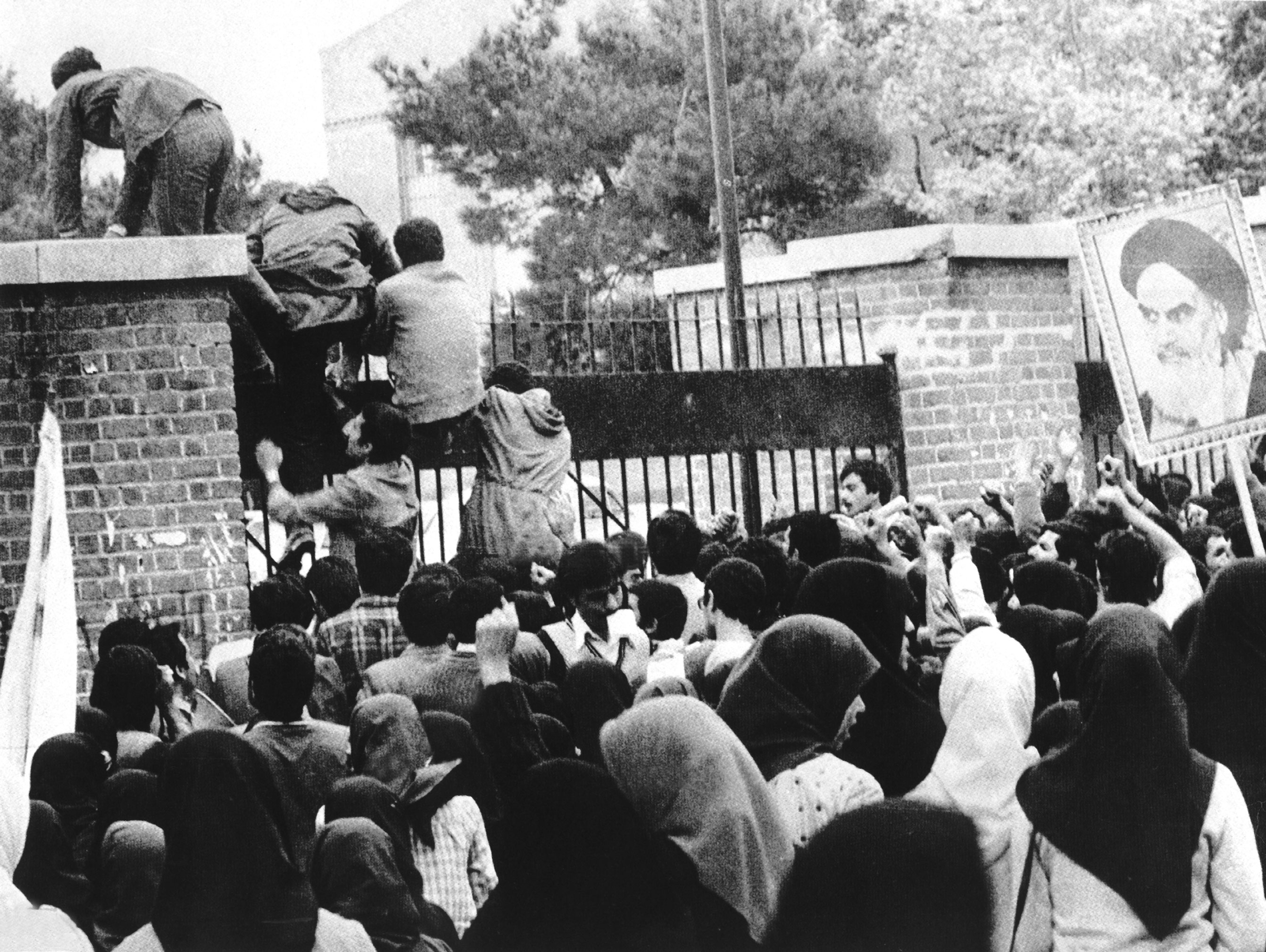
Iranian students enter U.S. embassy in Tehran.

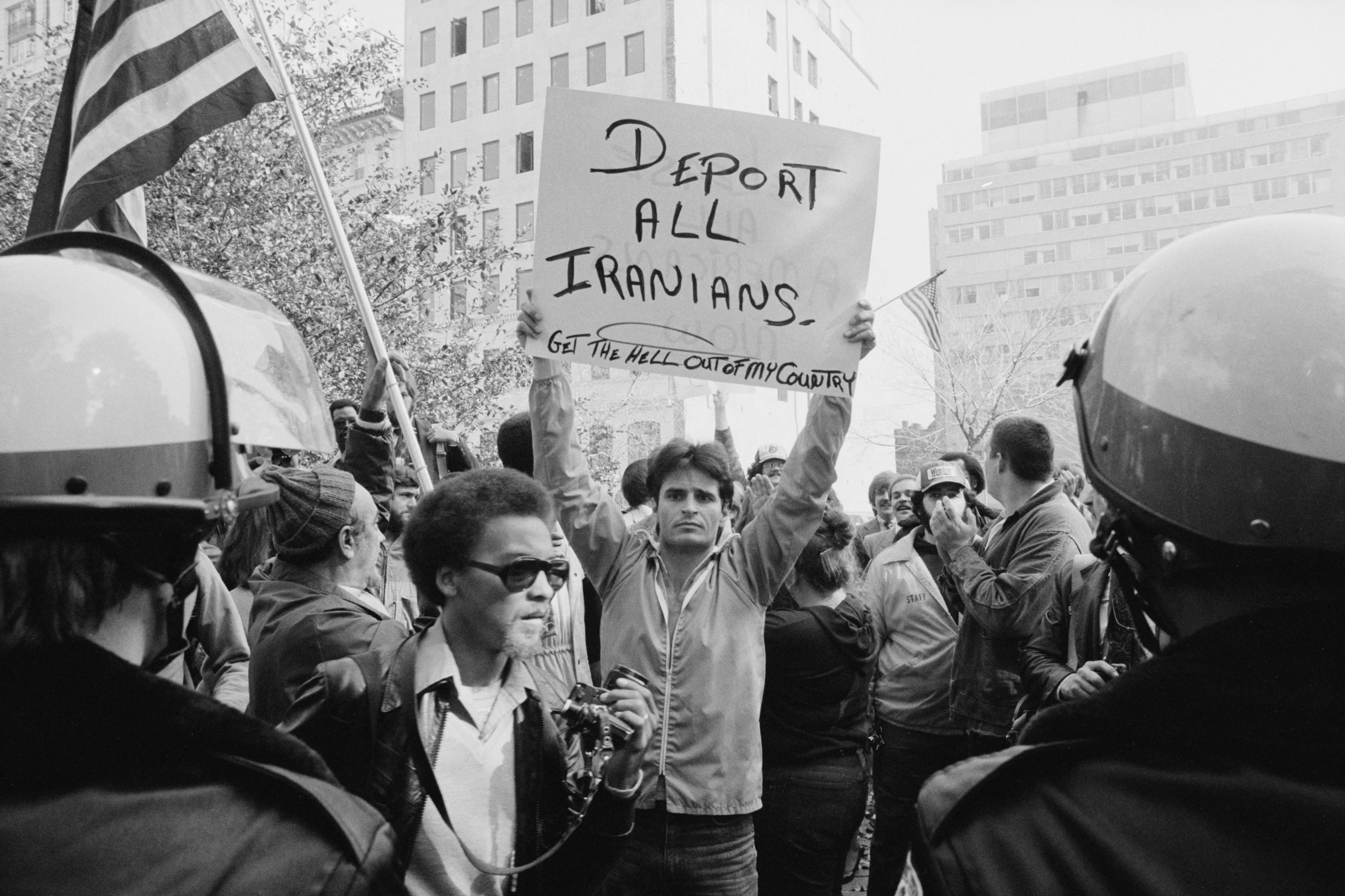
An anti-Iranian protest in Washington, D.C., in 1979.

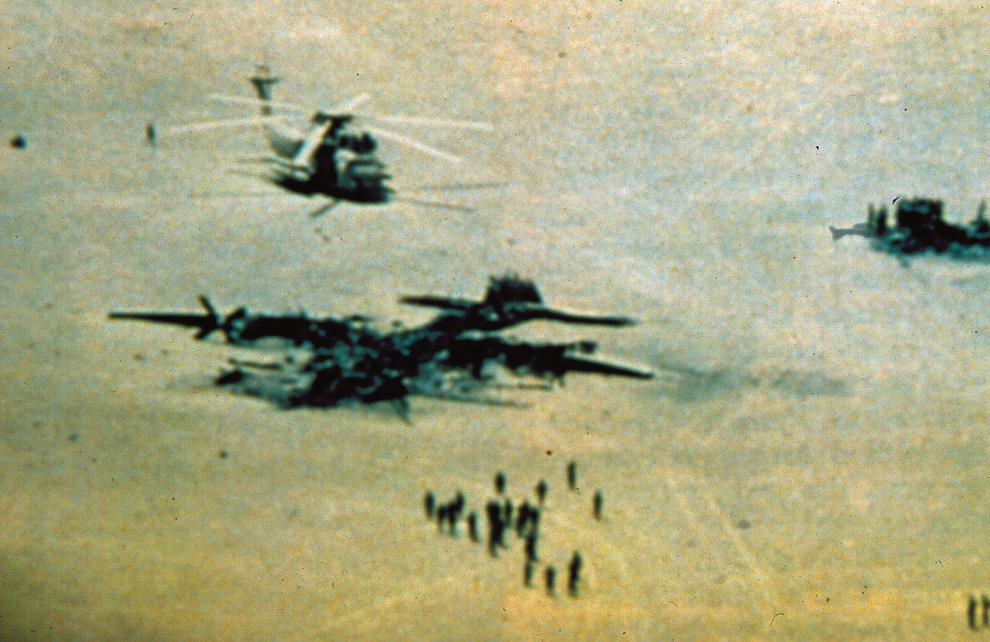
Overview of the wreckage at the Iranian Desert after the failed rescue operation by Delta Force, April 1980.

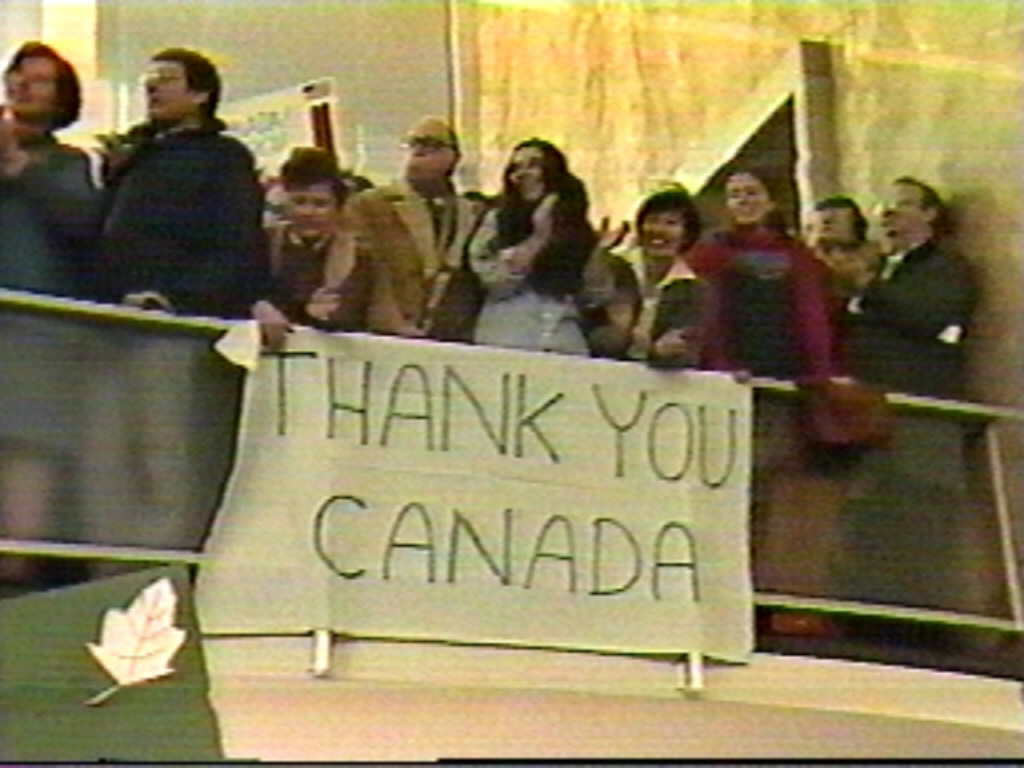
Americans welcoming the six freed hostage by Canadian diplomats during the Iran hostage crisis, 1980.

This is a timeline of the Iran hostage crisis (1979–1981), starting from the Shah Mohammed Reza Pahlavi's leaving of Iran and ending at the return of all hostages to the United States.

== 1979 ==
- 16 January: Shah Mohammad Reza Pahlavi leaves Iran for exile to Egypt.
- 1 February: Ayatollah Ruhollah Khomeini returns to Iran from France after fifteen years of exile
- 22 October: Shah Pahlavi arrives in the United States for cancer treatment.
- 4 November: Aggressive planned demonstrations take place near the Embassy of the United States. About 500 demonstrators climb over the embassy's fence as Iranian police look on. Embassy clerks ask for help from the Iranian government which does not come as promised. Embassy guards defend the compound with tear gas because firearms are not permitted for use. Secret documents are burned in the embassy. About ninety people are taken hostage of which 66 are American.
- 4 November: 52 hostages are taken to the Ambassador's residence while the embassy remains under the demonstrators' control.
- 5 November: Iranian government cancels all defense treaties with the United States and the Soviet Union.
- 6 November: Iranian Prime Minister Mehdi Bazargan's cabinet resigns. Iran is ruled by the Revolutionary Guards under the Ayatollah Ruhollah Khomeini.
- 7 November: U.S. President Jimmy Carter appoints two former federal officials, Ramsey Clark and William Miller, as delegates to negotiate the end of the hostage crisis. Ayatollah Khomeini refuses to see the delegation.
- 12 November: Iranian Foreign Minister Abolhassan Banisadr says the hostages will be released if the U.S. deports the Shah back to Iran.
- 14 November: The U.S. Government freezes the Iranian State bank accounts in the U.S. banks.
- 17 November: Khomeini orders the release of 8 African-American and 5 female hostages. 53 hostages remain held.
- 29 November: The U.S. sues Iran to the International Court of Justice for violating international law.
- 15 December: Shah Pahlavi leaves the U.S. for Panama.

== 1980 ==
- 28 January: Six American diplomats escape with Canadian passports from Iran with help from the Canadian Embassy in Tehran.
- 25 March: Shah Mohammad Reza Pahlavi returns to Egypt.
- 7 April: The U.S. cuts all diplomatic relations with Iran and puts Iran under embargo.
- 24 April: Negotiations fail and president Carter orders military rescue mission to free the hostages. Rescue fails in the Iranian desert as two helicopters collided. Eight U.S. soldiers die in the accident.
- 11 July: One hostage is freed for health reasons. 52 hostages are still in the Embassy compound.
- 27 July: Shah Mohammad Reza Pahlavi dies in Cairo, Egypt, after a cancer operation.
- 12 September: Ruhollah Khomeini puts new terms to release the hostages; the U.S. has to release all of the Shah's currency assets from his American bank accounts. According to the Iranian government, the worth of the foreign assets are about 32 billion U.S. dollars.
- 4 November: U.S. Presidential election is won by Ronald Reagan.
- 10 November – 8 January 1981: U.S. Deputy Secretary of State Warren Christopher's delegation negotiates alongside the Algerian government with a representative from the Iranian government on terms to free the hostages.

== 1981 ==
- 19 January: U.S. and Iran sign an agreement over the hostages. Iran releases all of the hostages and U.S. frees 8 billion U.S. dollars of Iranian State assets from American banks.
- 20 January: U.S. president-elect Ronald Reagan takes the oath of office. Only 20 minutes after Reagan's oath, Iran releases all 52 hostages who are flown to West Germany via Algeria where former U.S. president Jimmy Carter takes them back to the United States.
- Ten days after the release of the hostages a motorcycle parade takes place in New York City's Broadway.
