= New York Blood Center =

Nonprofit blood bank in New York City

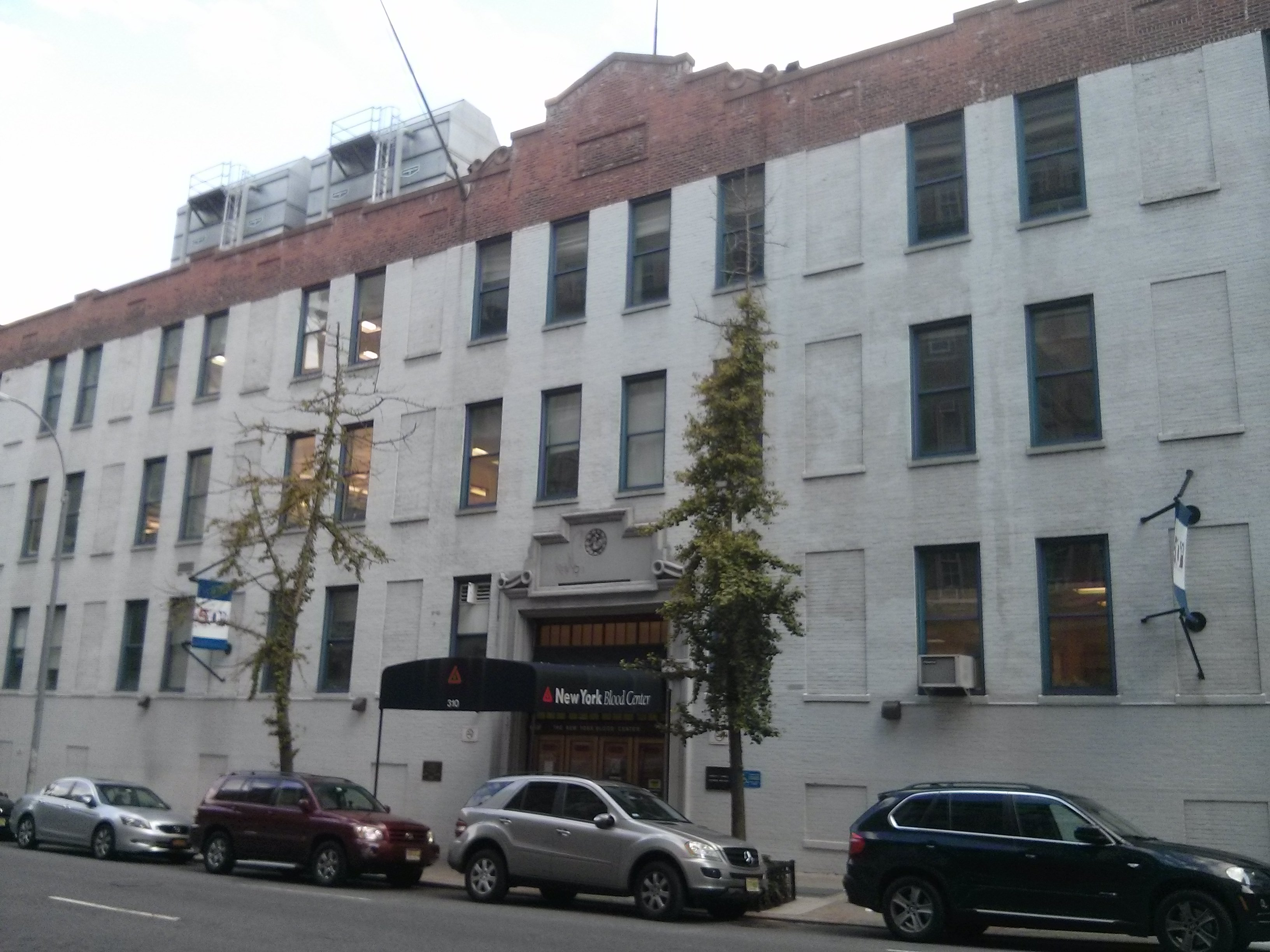
- 310 East 67th Street headquarters
- Founded: 1964
- Type: Blood bank
- Tax ID no.: 131949477
- Location: New York City, New York, United States
- Coordinates: 40.7650502°N 73.9600540°W
- Website: www.nybloodcenter.org

The New York Blood Center (NYBC) is a community, nonprofit blood bank based in New York City. Established in 1964 by Dr. Aaron Kellner, NYBC supplies blood to approximately 200 hospitals in the Northeast United States. NYBC and its operating divisions also provide transfusion-related medical services to over 500 hospitals nationally.

NYBC, along with its operating divisions Community Blood Center of Kansas City, Missouri (CBC), Innovative Blood Resources (IBR), Blood Bank of Delmarva (BBD), and Rhode Island Blood Center (RIBC), collect approximately 4,000 units of blood products each day and serve local communities of more than 75 million people in the Tri-State area (NY, NJ, CT), Mid Atlantic area (PA, DE, MD, VA), Missouri and Kansas, Minnesota, Nebraska, Rhode Island, and Southern New England.

In addition to serving the New York City metropolitan area, New Jersey, Connecticut and Pennsylvania, in May 2014, NYBC merged its operations with Community Blood Center of Greater Kansas City (CBC). In February 2016, NYBC and CBC announced the creation of the Kansas City-based National Center for Blood Group Genomics, a new laboratory that will focus on precision testing of blood donor samples.

NYBC maintains close relationships with both New York City's Police Department (NYPD) and Fire Department (FDNY). Among NYBC's largest donor groups is the NYPD, which donated more than 11,000 pints of blood through November 2015. At the same time, the FDNY participates with NYBC in the "Be The Match Program" operated by the National Marrow Donor Program (NMDP). More than 8,000 FDNY members are on the potential donor list, and 179 members have already given this life saving gift to those in need. FDNY members represent more than 10% of all NYBC bone marrow donors. Each year, at an annual induction ceremony hosted by FDNY and NYBC at FDNY headquarters, donors and their recipients meet for the first time. In 2016, Firefighter Mike Wilson was introduced to a recipient from Erie, Pennsylvania, who received his lifesaving bone marrow to treat her acute myeloid leukemia (AML), while Firefighter Frank Perdue met a recipient diagnosed with essential thrombocythemia, a rare chronic blood disorder. In 2015, firefighter Michael McCauley of Staten Island met his recipient, a United States Marine Sergeant who saw combat in Iraq, and who was subsequently diagnosed with acute myeloid leukemia (AML). Through FDNY’s participation in NYBC’s program, McCauley’s bone marrow is credited with saving the recipient's life.

NYBC houses Lindsley F. Kimball Research Institute and the Howard P. Milstein National Cord Blood Center, a public cord blood bank named after board member Howard Milstein. The National Cord Blood Program (NCBP), directed by Dr. Pablo Rubinstein, is the oldest and largest in the world. In August 2015, the NCBP announced a new collaboration with the University of California, Davis Health System to manufacture specialized lines of highly adaptable stem cells for potential new therapies for diseases that include anemia, leukemia, lymphoma, sickle cell disease and severe combined immunodeficiency.

The Lindsley F. Kimball Research Institute (LFKRI) has been awarded grants to conduct research in such areas as epidemiology and the development of HIV self-testing interventions, cellular therapy and transfusion medicine, in vitro platelet production, blood genomics, immunology, the development of infectious disease screening techniques and preventions for diseases like severe acute respiratory syndrome, Hepatitis B and Hepatitis C.

== History ==
In 2013, LFKRI was awarded a Grand Challenges Explorations Grant from a grant initiative engaging field leaders in global health to bring progress to targeted world problems. The Grand Challenges Explorations Grant was launched by the Bill and Melinda Gates Foundation in 2007. The LFKRI used grant money to study the transmission of parasites from Filarial Worm larvae to humans in order to develop a preventative drug to kill mature worms and prevent parasitic infection.

In 2014, the New York Blood Center's National Cord Blood Program (NCBP) at the Howard P. Milstein Cord Blood Center received the Prix Galien USA “Best Biotechnology Product” distinction for the development of HEMACORD, an innovative hematopoietic stem cell product and the first of its kind to be approved by the Food and Drug Administration.

In August 2016, NYBC also combined operations with Innovative Blood Resources, a blood center with operations in Minnesota and Nebraska.

LFKRI also oversaw a clinical trial of Immucor’s PreciseType HEA test, resulting in the approval of the product by the FDA in October 2016. The PreciseType HEA test screens blood donors for sickle cell trait (SCT), an inherited blood disorder that affects 1 million to 3 million Americans, including 8-10% of African Americans. PreciseType HEA is the only FDA-approved molecular test that provides clinicians and blood banks with detailed genetic matching information. Through its work with cord blood, stem cells and sickle cell treatments, NYBC is a leader in precision medicine, which takes into account individual variability in genes, environment, and lifestyle to more accurately match treatments to individual patients.

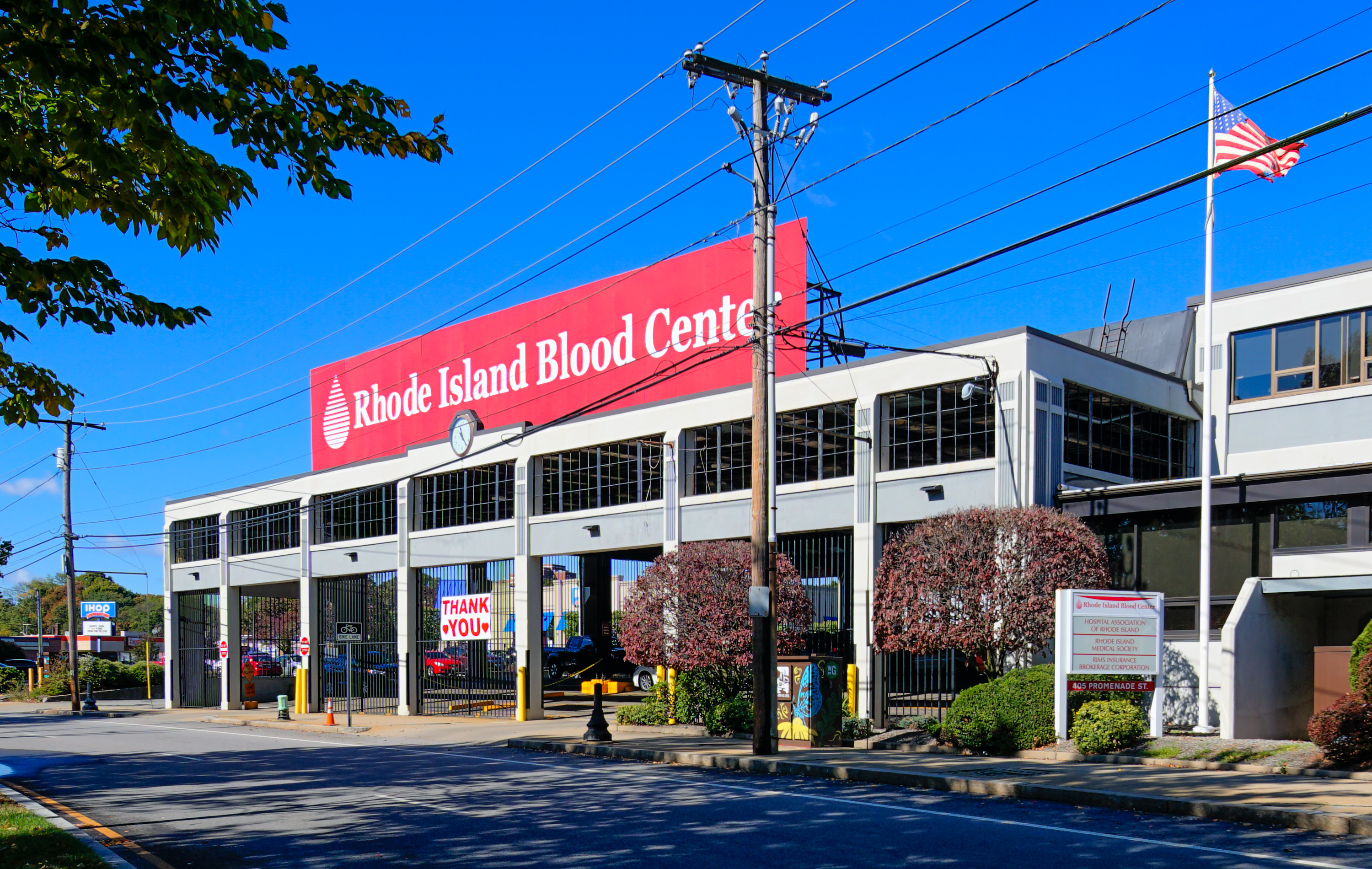
Rhode Island Blood Center, Providence

In 2019, New York Blood Center merged with the Rhode Island Blood Center (RIBC). The latter continues to do business as the Rhode Island Blood Center.

In 2020 New York Blood Center was the first blood center to collect convalescent blood plasma donations from people who have recovered from COVID-19 to treat other patients with advanced illness. On March 27, 2020, the first unit of convalescent blood plasma was drawn. In convalescent plasma treatment, the patient is transfused with the plasma from a recovered COVID-19 patient with the goal of using the donor’s antibodies to help clear the virus more rapidly. In January 2021, research by the Mayo Clinic validated the use of convalescent plasma treatment for COVID-19 patients amid widespread vaccine shortages.

== Primate research in Liberia ==
For a thirty-year period starting in the mid-1970s, the New York Blood Center conducted research experiments on a group of chimpanzees in Liberia. At the time, such primate testing was considered a standard part of medical research and drug development. After the studies were complete in 2004, NYBC moved the survivors onto six islands on the Farmington River in Liberia. Though NYBC continued to financially support the sanctuary for almost a decade at a cost of around $30,000 a month, they stopped in March 2015.

The situation set off a storm of protests by animal rights and animal welfare advocates, and NYBC said they received threats and social media campaigns which personally threatened their employees. On March 31, 2016, Citigroup issued a statement that "the current situation is not tolerable and we urge all parties involved to come up with a sustainable solution to ensure that these chimpanzees get the care they need." On May 19, New York State Senator Tony Avella held a press conference at New York City Hall to demand that NYBC fulfill its promise to provide lifelong care for the chimpanzees.

NYBC had asserted that the animals were owned by the Liberian government, and Liberian officials had repeatedly acknowledged their own responsibility for the care of the chimpanzees. Though NYBC voluntarily supported the chimps for years after its relationship with the Liberian government ended, they had spent millions of dollars on the chimps since the mid-2000s while repeatedly reaching out to the Liberian government and animal rights groups attempting to find a long term solution.

The New York Times had quoted Dr. Alfred Prince's 2005 article seeking primatologists and/or foundations to take over the care of the chimpanzees. In the article, Prince had written that NYBC "recognizes its responsibility to provide an endowment to fund the Sanctuary for the lifetime care of the chimpanzees." However, NYBC spokeswoman Victoria O'Neill responded that Prince had not been authorized to say that, that NYBC "did not ever establish any endowment for animal care, chimpanzees included," and "never had any obligation for care for the chimps, contractual or otherwise."

The Humane Society of the United States (HSUS) took over supporting the chimps, and started a campaign to raise funds for them. Negotiations between NYBC and HSUS in 2016 were unsuccessful, with NYBC maintaining that they had been confronted with requests that "have nothing to do with NYBC's original involvement in Liberia." However, in 2017 NYBC and HSUS came to an agreement with NYBC pledging $6 million directly to HSUS, who would assume responsibility for the lifetime care of the chimps.
