= Tony Mendez =

American CIA technical operations officer and writer

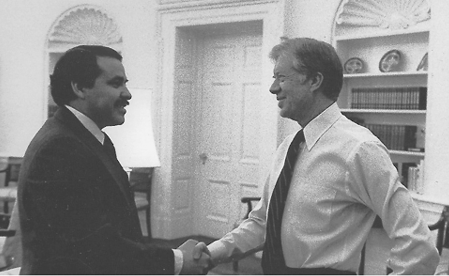
- Mendez meeting with Jimmy Carter after the Canadian Caper (1980)
- Born: Antonio Joseph Mendez; November 15, 1940; Eureka, Nevada, U.S.
- Died: January 19, 2019 (aged 78); Frederick, Maryland, U.S.
- Education: University of Colorado
- Spouses: Karen Mendez (died 1986); Jonna Mendez (m. 1991)
- Children: 4, including Antonio Tobias
- Awards: Intelligence Star (1980); CIA Trailblazer Award (1997); Order of the Sphinx (2000); Honorary Doctorate (2016) University of Colorado, Boulder
- Espionage activity
- Allegiance: United States
- Agency: CIA
- Service years: 1963–1990
- Rank: Technical Operations Officer, SIS-2
- Operations: Canadian Caper

Antonio Joseph Mendez (November 15, 1940 – January 19, 2019) was an American technical operations officer for the Central Intelligence Agency (CIA), who specialized in support of clandestine and covert CIA operations. He wrote four memoirs about his CIA experiences.

Mendez was decorated, and is now widely known, for his on-the-scene management of the "Canadian Caper" during the Iran hostage crisis. He exfiltrated six American diplomats from Iran in January 1980 by arranging to have them pose as a Canadian film crew. As part of their cover, the diplomats carried passports issued by the Canadian government to document them as Canadian citizens.

After declassification of records, the full details of the operation were reported in a 2007 article by Joshuah Bearman in Wired magazine. This was loosely adapted for the screenplay and development of the 2012 Academy Award-winning film Argo, directed by Ben Affleck, who also starred as Mendez. Mendez attended the 70th Golden Globe Awards to give a speech about the film, where it was nominated for (and later won) Best Motion Picture – Drama.

== Early life and education ==
Mendez was born in Eureka, Nevada, in 1940 to John George Mendez and Neva June Tognoni. He attended local public schools. His father was of Mexican descent, and his mother had Italian and French ancestry. In an interview by Open Your Eyes magazine, Mendez said that his father died when he was quite young. As he never really learned to speak Spanish and was cut off from his father's Mexican-American culture, he did not identify as Hispanic.

When Mendez was a teen, his family moved to Colorado. After graduating from Englewood high school, he studied art at the University of Colorado.

== Career ==
Mendez continued to work as an artist after college. He first worked as an illustrator and tool designer for Martin Marietta, a large aerospace firm. In 1965, Mendez answered a blind advertisement for a graphic artist. He was hired by the CIA and became an espionage artist for the Technical Services Division, where he specialized in identity document forgery and creating disguises. He worked as an officer in South Asia, Southeast Asia, and the Middle East, and served in the CIA for 25 years.

In 1980, in what became known as the Canadian Caper, Mendez travelled to Iran to rescue six American diplomats who had taken refuge at the Canadian embassy, after the United States embassy was overrun in the disruption related to the overthrow of the government. Mendez was part of a strategy to exfiltrate the diplomats by passing them off as a Canadian film crew, having received passports and supporting documents from the Canadian Government to identify them as such. He was awarded the Intelligence Star on March 12, 1980, for his efforts in leading the rescue mission.

== Marriage and family ==
Mendez and his first wife, Karen, had three children together. Karen Mendez died of cancer in 1986. One son, Ian, died in 2010. Another son, Antonio Tobias Mendez, became a sculptor.

In the mid-1980s, Mendez worked with Jonna Hiestand Goeser, also a CIA officer, on rebuilding the U.S. security organization in the Soviet Union and later Russia. Following Mendez's retirement in 1990, they married in 1991. They had a son together.

== Later years and death ==
After retiring from the CIA in 1990, Mendez and his wife Jonna, herself a 27-year veteran of the CIA, served on the board of directors of the International Spy Museum in Washington, D.C. He also worked as an artist.

Mendez wrote four non-fiction memoirs, two with his wife including:

- Master of Disguise: My Secret Life in the CIA (1999), with Malcolm McConnell, a memoir of his CIA experiences
- Spy Dust: Two Masters of Disguise Reveal the Tools and Operations that Helped Win the Cold War (2003), with Jonna Mendez and Bruce Henderson.
- Argo: How the CIA and Hollywood Pulled Off the Most Audacious Rescue in History (2012), with Matt Baglio, a more lengthy account of the Canadian Caper.
- The Moscow Rules: The Secret CIA Tactics That Helped America Win the Cold War (2019), with Jonna Mendez.

His first book was lauded in 2002 by John Hollister Hedley, former Chairman of the CIA's Publications Review Board, as one of three "landmark memoirs" by former CIA officers.

Mendez was interviewed by film director Errol Morris for the First Person TV series. He appeared in the season one episode 11, "The Little Gray Man."

In 2009, Mendez was diagnosed with Parkinson's disease. He died on January 19, 2019, from complications of Parkinson's disease. He was 78.

== Representation in other media ==
In the first decade of the 21st century, records related to the Canadian Caper were declassified. Journalist Joshuah Bearman wrote a full article about this in the April 2007 issue of Wired magazine.

Bearman's account was loosely adapted for the screenplay and development of the feature film Argo (2012). It was directed by Ben Affleck, who also starred as Mendez. The film won the Academy Award for Best Picture. When interviewed in 2013 by ShowBizCafe.com, Mendez was asked how he felt about being portrayed by Ben Affleck, who is non-Hispanic. Mendez noted that losing his father when he was young meant he did not learn Spanish nor much of his father's culture. He said, "I don't think of myself as a Hispanic. I think of myself as a person who grew up in the desert."
