= Lindsley F. Kimball =

American nonprofit administrator

- Born: Lindsley Fiske Kimball; 1895; New York City, US
- Died: August 16, 1992 (aged 96–97); Newtown, Pennsylvania, US
- Education: Columbia University (BA); New York University (PhD)
- Occupation: nonprofit administrator
- Employer: Rockefeller Foundation
- Known for: former president of the United Service Organizations

Lindsley Fiske Kimball (1895 – August 16, 1992) was an American nonprofit administrator who served as an associate to John D. Rockefeller Jr. and was the former president of the United Service Organizations and the National Urban League.

== Biography ==
Kimball was born in Brooklyn and graduated from Columbia University in 1917.

After graduating from Columbia, he served in the United States Navy during World War I and reached the rank of lieutenant. After the war, Kimball spent four years working in the office of the Underwood Typewriter Company and studied accounting.

Kimball began his career in Nonprofit Management as a Sunday school superintendent for St. Paul's Congregational Church in Brooklyn. He helped found the Congregational Church in Manhasset, New York and supervised its Sunday school.

He also served as president of the Brooklyn Borough Council of the Boy Scouts of America, then the nation's largest chapter. While at the Boy Scouts, Kimball earned a PhD in sociology and economics from New York University in 1930.

In 1938, Kimball became an executive with the Greater New York Fund that merged with United Way of New York City and was recruited by John D. Rockefeller Jr. to work on special projects and became associated with the Rockefeller family.

During World War II and the Korean War, Kimball served as president of the United Service Organizations. He retired from the organization in 1953.

Kimball also served as president of the National Urban League, where he recruited Whitney Young as its executive director. In addition, Kimball was also fundraising chairman for the United Negro College Fund and was the vice president of the General Education Board.

Kimball with involved with the Rockefeller family, serving as executive vice president of the Rockefeller Foundation, a trustee and treasurer of Rockefeller University, associate to the Rockefeller Brothers Fund and aide to John D. Rockefeller Jr.

In the 1960s, Kimball helped found the New York Blood Center, whose research institute was named in his honor. He retired from his nonprofit career in 1979.

== Personal life ==
Kimball died of intestinal hemorrhage on August 16, 1992, at his home in Newtown, Pennsylvania at age 97.
