= ShowBizCafe.com =

ShowBizCafe.com is the first Spanish language website devoted to movies for the US Hispanic. It offers a variety of film content from Hollywood and Latin America including news, reviews, interviews, trailers and feature articles. It was founded, incorporated and launched by Jack Rico in February 2007. The company is headquartered in Manhattan, New York.

== Television appearances ==
- NBC's The Debrief with David Ushery (English)
