= Richard J. Schmeelk Canada Fellowship =

- Formation: 1985
- Headquarters: Montreal, Quebec, Canada
- Official language: English, French
- Key people: Richard J. Schmeelk (Founder)

The Richard J. Schmeelk Canada Fellowship is a post-graduate award for selected students at eligible Canadian universities. Founded by American investment banker and philanthropist Richard J. Schmeelk, the scholarship is administered by the Schmeelk Canada Foundation, a national charitable organization.

The scholarship is awarded to Canadian citizens who wish to pursue their masters or doctoral studies in Canada's other official language. Schmeelk scholars may study any full-time postgraduate program offered at eligible universities: Western University (London) or the University of Calgary for Francophones, and the Université de Montréal or Université Laval (Québec) for Anglophones. Bilingual applicants may be granted the award for study outside of their province of origin and residence. The award of $10 000 per semester is granted for up to four semesters.

== History ==
Through working for 30 years on Wall Street at Salomon Brothers, American investment banker Richard Schmeelk developed a strong relationship with several Canadian corporate leaders and government officials. Upon his retirement from Salomon in 1985, Schmeelk wanted to show his gratitude to Canada, and so on the urging of his Canadian colleagues, he decided to create a scholarship to encourage greater understanding and collaboration between the Anglophone and Francophone communities of Canada and to strengthen relationships between Canadian business and government.

Since 1985, the fellowship has been awarded to over 80 young Canadians - with a total awarded value of over $3 million.

In 2005, Richard J. Schmeelk was awarded the Knight of the National Order of Quebec in recognition of his contribution to building relationships between Anglophone and Francophone communities of Canada and his philanthropy to other Canadian causes, such as the Montreal Museum of Fine Arts. Richard J. Schmeelk has also been awarded honorary doctorates at Western University and Université Laval.

== Standards ==
There are three standards by which applicants are judged:

- The applicant's likelihood of contributing to the development of tolerance and understanding between Anglophone and Francophone Canadians, and Canada's regional differences from east to west.
- The applicant's academic achievement.
- The applicant's maturity and character.

== Governance ==
Notable advisory members include:

- Rt. Hon. John Turner, PC CC QC, Former Prime Minister of Canada
- Hon. William G. Davis, PCCCOOnt QC, Former Premier, Province of Ontario
- Raymond Garneau, OC, Former Chairman, President and Chief Operating Officer of Industrial Alliance
- W. Darcy McKeough OC, Former Treasurer, Province of Ontario
- Guy Saint-Pierre, CC, GOQ, Former Minister of Education, Province of Quebec, Former Chairman Royal Bank of Canada
- The Hon. Michael Meighen, QC, Former Senator of Canada
- Marc H. Brillon, Principal, Clanical Investments
- Robert J. Foster, Chief Executive Officer, Capital Canada Limited
- A. Jean de Grandpré CC, Former President and CEO Bell Canada Enterprises Inc.
- Thomas E. Kierans, OC Vice President and Chair, SSHRC, Former CEO C.D. Howe Institute
- André Saumier, Former President and CEO, Montreal Stock Exchange, Board of Directors, Academics without Borders
- Guy Savard, CM, Former President and Chief Operating Officer of Caisse de dépôt et placement du Québec and Former Chairman, Merrill Lynch
- Paul Davenport, OC, Former President and Vice-Chancellor, Western University
