= Argo (2012 film) =

American thriller film by Ben Affleck

- Theatrical release poster
- Directed by: Ben Affleck
- Screenplay by: Chris Terrio
- Based on: The Master of Disguise by Antonio J. Mendez; "The Great Escape: How the CIA Used a Fake Sci-Fi Flick to Rescue Americans from Tehran" by Joshuah Bearman
- Produced by: Ben Affleck; George Clooney; Grant Heslov
- Starring: Ben Affleck; Bryan Cranston; Alan Arkin; John Goodman
- Cinematography: Rodrigo Prieto
- Edited by: William Goldenberg
- Music by: Alexandre Desplat
- Production companies: GK Films; Smokehouse Pictures
- Distributed by: Warner Bros. Pictures
- Release dates: August 31, 2012 (Telluride); October 12, 2012 (United States)
- Running time: 120 minutes
- Country: United States
- Language: English
- Budget: $44.5 million
- Box office: $232.3 million

Argo is a 2012 American historical political espionage drama thriller film directed by, produced by, and starring Ben Affleck. The screenplay, written by Chris Terrio, was adapted from the 1999 memoir The Master of Disguise by U.S. C.I.A. operative Tony Mendez and the 2007 Wired article "The Great Escape: How the CIA Used a Fake Sci-Fi Flick to Rescue Americans from Tehran" written by Joshuah Bearman. The film deals with the "Canadian Caper", in which Mendez led the rescue of six U.S. diplomats from Tehran, Iran, under the guise of filming a science-fiction film during the 1979–81 Iran hostage crisis. The film, which also has Bryan Cranston, Alan Arkin, and John Goodman in supporting roles, was released by Warner Bros. Pictures in the United States on October 12, 2012. It was produced by Affleck, Grant Heslov and George Clooney.

Argo became a box office success, grossing $232 million worldwide, and receiving widespread critical acclaim for the acting, Affleck's direction, Terrio's screenplay, the editing, and Desplat's score. Commentators and participants in the actual operation criticized flaws in historical accuracy. The film received seven nominations at the 85^{th} Academy Awards and won three, for Best Picture, Best Adapted Screenplay, and Best Film Editing.

The film also earned five Golden Globe Award nominations; it won Best Motion Picture – Drama and Best Director, and Alan Arkin was nominated for Best Supporting Actor – Motion Picture. It won Outstanding Performance by a Cast in a Motion Picture at the 19^{th} Screen Actors Guild Awards and Arkin was nominated for Outstanding Performance by a Male Actor in a Supporting Role. It also won: Best Film, Best Editing and Best Director at the 66^{th} British Academy Film Awards, Los Angeles Film Critics Association Awards for Best Screenplay and 37^{th} Hochi Film Award for Best International Picture.

== Plot ==
On November 4, 1979, Iranian Islamists storm the United States Embassy in Tehran in retaliation for the right of asylum granted by President Jimmy Carter to Shah Mohammad Reza Pahlavi, whose Western-supported monarchy was overthrown by the Iranian Revolution. Sixty-six embassy staff are taken hostage, but six avoid capture and are secretly sheltered in the home of Canadian ambassador Ken Taylor.

The U.S. State Department explores options for exfiltrating them from Iran and consults Tony Mendez, a U.S. Central Intelligence Agency exfiltration specialist. He points out the flaws in their proposals to have the staff members pose as volunteer "do-gooders" (few are willing to risk captivity) or volunteer agricultural specialists (it's a snowy winter) or having them travel hundreds of miles through a mountainous border on bicycles (tires are unlikely to endure the trip). Mendez can think of no alternative until inspired by watching Battle for the Planet of the Apes. The cover story he crafts for the escapees requires them to pose as Canadian filmmakers (the only group Mendez deems the revolutionaries will believe oblivious enough to risk filming in a volatile country) scouting exotic locations for a science-fiction film in Iran. Though not fool-proof, Mendez believes this to be the "least bad option."

On the advice of John Chambers, a Hollywood make-up artist who had previously worked for the CIA, Mendez works with film producer Lester Siegel to create a phony film production company. They successfully establish the pretense of developing Argo, a "science fantasy adventure" in the style of Star Wars, to lend the cover story credibility.

The revolutionaries reassemble embassy photographs shredded before the takeover and realize some personnel are unaccounted for. The housekeeper at the Canadian Embassy, questioned by revolutionary interrogators, denies anyone is staying there who does not belong. Posing as a producer for Argo, Mendez enters Iran under the alias Kevin Harkins and meets with the six escapees, who are growing restless. With the cooperation and under the authority of the Canadian government, Mendez passes along to them Canadian passports and fake identities. The escapees reluctantly go along, knowing that Mendez is also risking his own life. A scouting visit to the bazaar to maintain their cover story takes a bad turn when a hostile shopkeeper harasses them for taking photographs without permission, but their Iranian culture contact hustles them away from the hostile crowd.

Mendez is told the operation has been canceled in favor of a planned military rescue of the hostages. He pushes ahead anyway, forcing his boss, Deputy Director Jack O'Donnell, to hastily re-obtain authorization for the mission and rebook their canceled tickets on a Swissair flight. Tensions rise at the airport, where the escapees' new ticket reservations are belatedly confirmed, and the head guard's call to the fake Hollywood production company is answered only at the last second. The escapees board the plane as airport authorities are alerted to the ruse but fail to stop the plane from taking off.

U.S. involvement in the rescue is suppressed to protect the remaining hostages from retaliation, and full credit is given to the Canadian government. Taylor shuts down the embassy and leaves Iran with his wife while their Iranian housekeeper escapes to Iraq. Mendez is awarded the Intelligence Star, secretly due to the mission's classified nature, and returns to his wife and son in Virginia.

A textual epilogue reveals that the remaining hostages were released after 444 days (1.22 years) in captivity. Chambers, who received the Intelligence Medal of Merit, remained friends with Mendez until his death. Mendez's Intelligence Star was returned to him after Bill Clinton declassified the Canadian Caper in 1997. At the time of the film’s release, Mendez lived with his family in rural Maryland.

== Cast ==
- Ben Affleck as CIA Officer Tony Mendez
- Bryan Cranston as CIA Deputy Director Jack O'Donnell
- Alan Arkin as Lester Siegel
- John Goodman as John Chambers
- Victor Garber as Canadian Ambassador Ken Taylor
- Tate Donovan as Bob Anders
- Clea DuVall as Cora Lijek
- Scoot McNairy as Joe Stafford
- Rory Cochrane as Lee Schatz
- Christopher Denham as Mark Lijek
- Kerry Bishé as Kathy Stafford
- Kyle Chandler as Chief of Staff Hamilton Jordan
- Chris Messina as CIA Officer Malinov
- Željko Ivanek as Robert Pender
- Titus Welliver as Jon Bates
- Keith Szarabajka as Adam Engell
- Philip Baker Hall as CIA Director Stansfield Turner
- Bob Gunton as Secretary of State Cyrus Vance
- Matthew Glave as Col. Charles W. Scott
- Richard Kind as Max Klein
- Michael Parks as Jack Kirby
- Richard Dillane as OSS Officer Nicholls
- Omid Abtahi as Reza Borhani
- Sheila Vand as Sahar
- Taylor Schilling as Christine Mendez, wife of Tony Mendez
- Fahim Fazli as Komiteh subordinate
- Yuri Sardarov as Rossi
- Jimmy Carter as himself (voice over during credits)

== Production ==
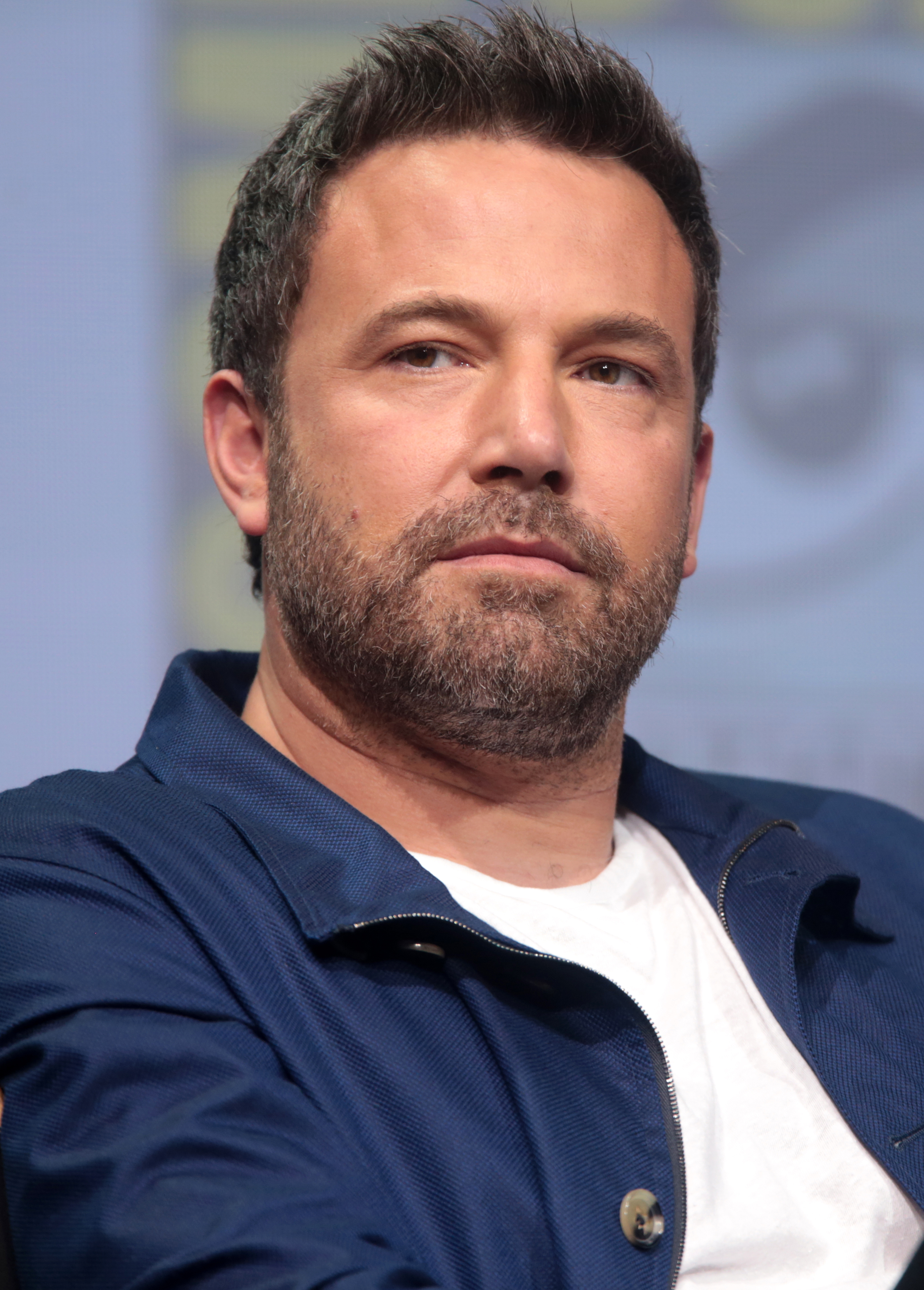
Producer, director and star Ben Affleck

=== Development ===
Argo is based on the "Canadian Caper" that took place during the Iran hostage crisis in 1979 and 1980. Chris Terrio wrote the screenplay based on Joshuah Bearman's 2007 article "How the CIA Used a Fake Sci-Fi Flick to Rescue Americans from Tehran," which was published in Wired. Affleck mentioned the influences for the film, which include Costa-Gavras's work, All the President's Men, The Killing of a Chinese Bookie, and The Battle of Algiers which served as references.

In 2007, producers Ben Affleck, George Clooney, Grant Heslov and executive producer David Klawans set up a project based on the article. Affleck's participation was announced in February 2011. The following June, Alan Arkin was the first person cast in the film.

=== Filming ===
After the rest of the roles were cast, filming began in Los Angeles in August 2011. Additional filming took place in McLean, Virginia; Washington, D.C.; and Istanbul. The scene in which Mendez drives up to and walks into the CIA headquarters lobby was filmed with permission at the CIA's original headquarters building in Virginia; all other scenes set at the CIA were filmed in the basement of the Los Angeles Times Building.

As a historical piece, the film made use of archival news footage from ABC, CBS and NBC; and included popular songs from the era, such as "Little T&A" by The Rolling Stones (an anachronism, as it was not released until the following year), "Sultans of Swing" by Dire Straits, "Dance the Night Away" by Van Halen and "When the Levee Breaks" by Led Zeppelin. For its part, Warner Bros. used its 1972–1984 production logo featuring the "Big W" logo designed by Saul Bass for Warner Communications to open the film and painted on its studio lot's famed water tower the logo of The Burbank Studios (the facility's name during the 1970s and 1980s when Warner shared it with Columbia Pictures).

The screenplay used by the CIA to create their cover story was an adaptation of Roger Zelazny's 1967 novel Lord of Light. Producer Barry Geller had spearheaded an earlier attempt to produce the film using the original title. After that production attempt failed, the screenplay was renamed Argo and used by the CIA.

According to Tony Mendez, Studio Six—the phony Hollywood production office he helped create at the core of the CIA plan—proved so convincing that even weeks after the rescue was complete and the office had folded, 26 scripts were delivered to its address, including one from Steven Spielberg.

In April 2016, research by Vice, based on documents received under the Freedom of Information Act, revealed that the CIA's public relations arm was involved in the production of the 2012 Argo, just as it provided information to a number of other American entertainment productions (such as the well-established case of the 2012 film Zero Dark Thirty).

== Release and reception ==
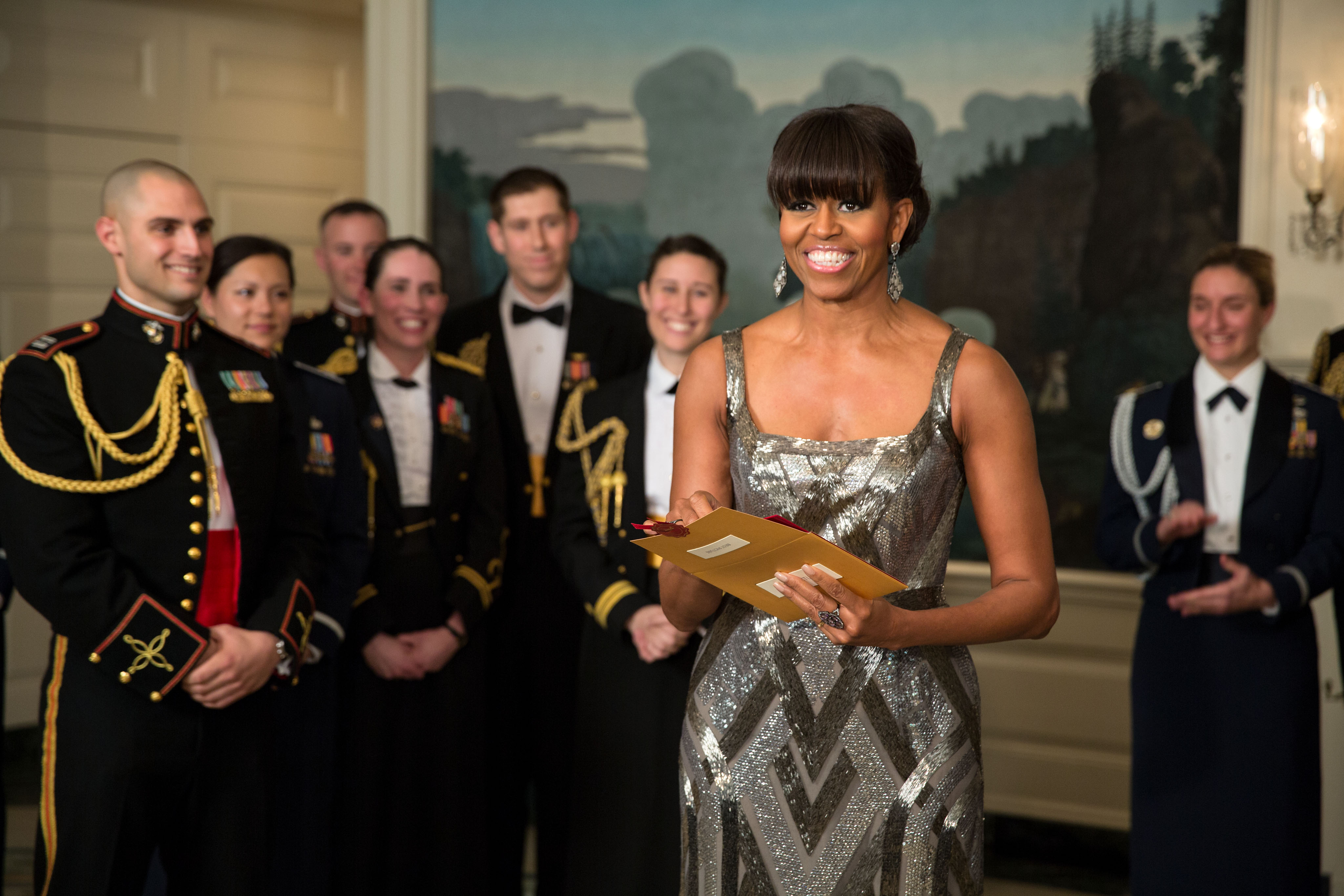
First Lady Michelle Obama announces the winner of Academy Award for Best Picture, Argo, live from the Diplomatic Room of the White House, February 24, 2013.

=== Critical response ===
On the review aggregator website Rotten Tomatoes, 96% of 360 critics' reviews are positive, with an average rating of 8.4/10. The website's consensus reads: "Tense, exciting, and often darkly comic, Argo recreates a historical event with vivid attention to detail and finely wrought characters." Metacritic, which uses a weighted average, assigned the film a score of 86 out of 100, based on 45 critics, indicating "universal acclaim". Audiences polled by CinemaScore gave the film an average grade of "A+" on an A+ to F scale.

Naming Argo one of the best 11 films of 2012, critic Stephen Holden of The New York Times wrote: "Ben Affleck's seamless direction catapults him to the forefront of Hollywood filmmakers turning out thoughtful entertainment." The Washington Times said it felt "like a movie from an earlier era—less frenetic, less showy, more focused on narrative than sensation," but that the script included "too many characters that he doesn't quite develop."

Writing in the Chicago Sun-Times, Roger Ebert posited,

The craft in this film is rare. It is so easy to manufacture a thriller from chases and gunfire, and so very hard to fine-tune it out of exquisite timing and a plot that's so clear to us we wonder why it isn't obvious to the Iranians. After all, who in their right mind would believe a space opera was being filmed in Iran during the hostage crisis?

Ebert gave the film four out of four stars, calling it "spellbinding" and "surprisingly funny", and chose it as the best film of the year, the last film he would choose for this honor before his death in 2013. He also correctly predicted that it would win the Academy Award for Best Picture, following its presentation at the Toronto International Film Festival.

Literary critic Stanley Fish wrote that the film is a standard caper film in which "some improbable task has to be pulled off by a combination of ingenuity, training, deception and luck." He goes on to describe the film's structure: "(1) the presentation of the scheme to reluctant and unimaginative superiors, (2) the transformation of a ragtag bunch of ne'er-do-wells and wackos into a coherent, coordinated unit and (3) the carrying out of the task." Although he acknowledged the film is good at building and sustaining suspense, he concluded that:

This is one of those movies that depend on your not thinking much about it; for as soon as you reflect on what's happening rather than being swept up in the narrative flow, there doesn't seem much to it aside from the skill with which suspense is maintained despite the fact that you know in advance how it's going to turn out. ... Once the deed is successfully done, there's really nothing much to say, and anything that is said seems contrived. That is the virtue of an entertainment like this; it doesn't linger in the memory and provoke afterthoughts.

In 2025, it was one of the films voted for the "Readers' Choice" edition of The New York Times' list of "The 100 Best Movies of the 21^{st} Century," finishing at number 244.

=== Reaction by Iranians ===
Abolhassan Banisadr, foreign minister and then president during the incident, argued that the movie does not take into account the fact that most of the cabinet members advocated freeing all the American personnel quickly. Jian Ghomeshi, a Canadian writer and radio figure of Iranian descent, thought the film had a "deeply troubling portrayal of the Iranian people." Ghomeshi asserted "among all the rave reviews, virtually no one in the mainstream media has called out [the] unbalanced depiction of an entire ethnic national group, and the broader implications of the portrait." He also suggested that the timing of the film was poor, as American and Iranian political relations were at a low point. University of Michigan history professor Juan Cole had a similar assessment, writing that the film's narrative fails to provide adequate historical context for the events it portrays, and such errors of omission lead all of the Iranian characters in the film to be depicted as ethnic stereotypes.

A November 3, 2012 article in the Los Angeles Times claimed that the film had received very little attention in Tehran, though Masoumeh Ebtekar, who was the spokesperson of the students who took the hostages and called only "Tehran Mary" in the film's credits, said that the film did not show "the real reasons behind the event". The film also ignores the importance of the date of the Embassy takeover. Mark Bowden, in his book on the subject, noted that November 4 was recognized as National Students' Day to acknowledge the student protesters killed by the Shah's police the year before. He also pointed out that this was the same date that the Ayatollah Khomeini had been exiled 15 years before.

Bootleg DVDs have become popular and are estimated at "several hundreds of thousands" of copies. Interpretations of the film's popularity in Iran have varied, ranging from the fact that the movie portrays the excesses of the revolution and the hostage crisis, which had been long glorified in Iran, to Iranians viewing it as a reminder of what caused the poor relations with America and the ensuing cost to Iran, decades after the embassy takeover.

=== Top ten lists ===
Professional reviewers ranked the film with other releases for 2012, as follows:

| Rank | Reviewer | Publication |
|---|---|---|
| 1^{st} | Christy Lemire | Associated Press |
| 1^{st} | Joe Neumaier and Elizabeth Weitzman | New York Daily News |
| 1^{st} | Roger Ebert | Chicago Sun-Times |
| 2^{nd} | Lisa Kennedy | Denver Post |
| 2^{nd} | Richard Roeper | Richardroeper.com |
| 4^{th} | Betsy Sharkey | Los Angeles Times |
| 5^{th} | Lisa Schwarzbaum | Entertainment Weekly |
| 5^{th} | Peter Travers | Rolling Stone |
| 5^{th} | Stephen Holden | The New York Times |
| 6^{th} | Mary Pols | Time |
| 6^{th} | Mick LaSalle | San Francisco Chronicle |
| 7^{th} | Ann Hornaday | The Washington Post |
| 7^{th} | Anne Thompson | Indiewire |
| 7^{th} | Ty Burr | The Boston Globe |
| 8^{th} | Owen Gleiberman | Entertainment Weekly |
| 9^{th} | Peter Bradshaw | The Guardian |
| Top 10 (ranked alphabetically) | Bob Mondello | NPR |
| Top 10 (ranked alphabetically) | Calvin Wilson | St. Louis Post-Dispatch |
| Top 10 (ranked alphabetically) | Claudia Puig | USA Today |
| Top 10 (ranked alphabetically) | David Denby | The New Yorker |
| Top 10 (ranked alphabetically) | Joe Morgenstern | The Wall Street Journal |
| Top 10 (ranked alphabetically) | Joe Williams | St. Louis Post-Dispatch |
| Top 10 (ranked alphabetically) | Kenneth Turan | Los Angeles Times |

=== Box office ===
Argo earned $136 million in the United States, and $96.3 million in other territories, for a worldwide total of $232.3 million.

The film debuted in second place with $19.5 million, then made $16.4 million in its sophomore weekend. In its third weekend the film made $12.1 million, finishing in first place.

=== Home media ===
The film was released in North America on February 19, 2013, on DVD and Blu-ray Disc.

=== Accolades ===
The film was nominated for seven Academy Awards and won three, for Best Picture, Best Adapted Screenplay and Best Film Editing. Affleck was not nominated for Best Director, and following the announcement of the nominations, Bradley Cooper, who was nominated for his leading performance in Silver Linings Playbook, declared: "Ben Affleck got robbed." This opinion was shared by the ceremony's host Seth MacFarlane, who joked: "Argo's story is so top-secret that its director remains unknown to the Academy", and by Quentin Tarantino, whose film Django Unchained was nominated in several categories.

Entertainment Weekly wrote about this controversy:

Standing in the Golden Globe pressroom with his directing trophy, Affleck acknowledged that it was frustrating not to get an Oscar nod when many felt he deserved one. But he's keeping a sense of humor. "I mean, I also didn't get the acting nomination," he pointed out. "And no one's saying I got snubbed there!"

In 2021, members of Writers Guild of America West (WGAW) and Writers Guild of America, East (WGAE) voted its screenplay 85^{th} in WGA’s 101 Greatest Screenplays of the 21^{st} Century (so far).

== Historical inaccuracies ==
=== Canadian versus CIA roles ===
After the film was previewed at the 2012 Toronto International Film Festival, many critics said that it unfairly glorified the CIA's role and minimized the Canadian government's role (particularly that of Ambassador Taylor) in the extraction operation. Maclean's asserted that "the movie rewrites history at Canada's expense, making Hollywood and the CIA the saga's heroic saviours while Taylor is demoted to a kindly concierge."

The postscript text said that the CIA let Taylor take the credit for political purposes, which some critics thought implied that he did not deserve the accolades he received. In response to this criticism, Affleck changed the postscript text to read: "The involvement of the CIA complemented efforts of the Canadian embassy to free the six held in Tehran. To this day the story stands as an enduring model of international co-operation between governments." The Toronto Star wrote, "Even that hardly does Canada justice."

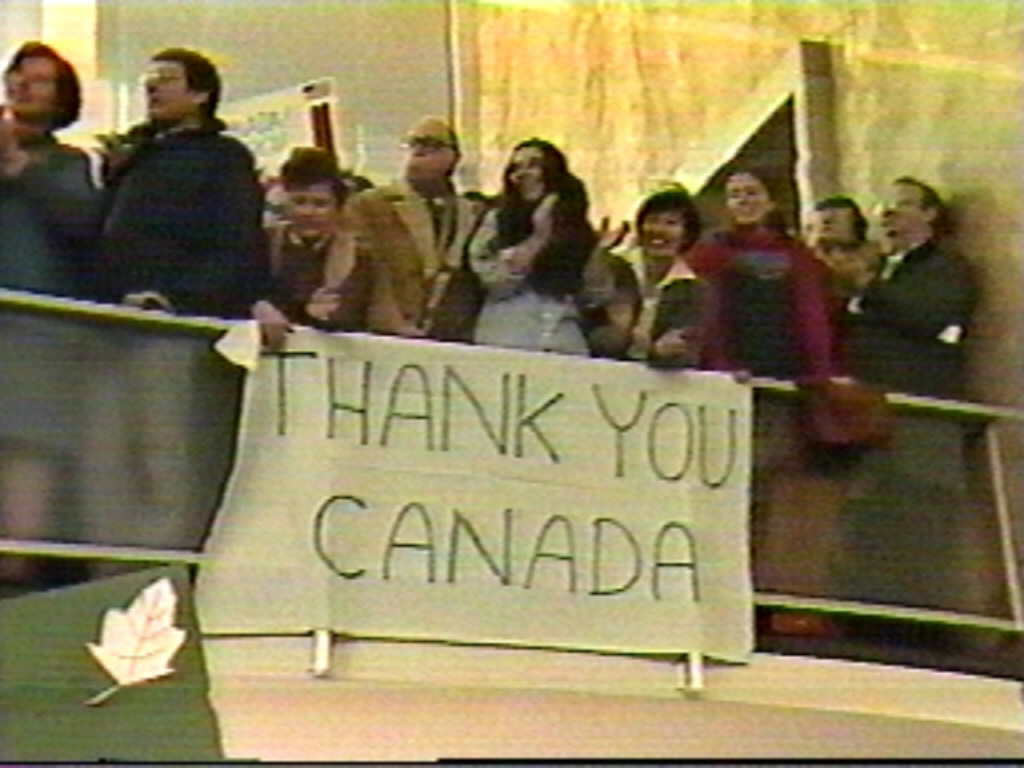
People welcoming the six American diplomats back to the United States and expressing thanks to Canada, 1980

In a CNN interview, former U.S. president Jimmy Carter addressed the controversy:

90% of the contributions to the ideas and the consummation of the plan was Canadian. And the movie gives almost full credit to the American CIA. And with that exception, the movie is very good. But Ben Affleck's character in the film was... only in Tehran a day and a half. And the main hero, in my opinion, was Ken Taylor, who was the Canadian ambassador who orchestrated the entire process.

Taylor noted, "In reality, Canada was responsible for the six and the CIA was a junior partner. But I realize this is a movie and you have to keep the audience on the edge of their seats." In the film, Taylor is shown as having been ordered to close down the Canadian embassy. This did not happen, and the Canadians never considered abandoning the six Americans who had taken refuge under their protection.

Affleck asserted:

Because we say it's based on a true story, rather than this is a true story, we're allowed to take some dramatic license. There's a spirit of truth .... the kinds of things that are really important to be true are—for example, the relationship between the U.S. and Canada. The U.S. stood up collectively as a nation and said, "We like you, we appreciate you, we respect you, and we're in your debt."... There were folks who didn't want to stick their necks out and the Canadians did. They said, "We'll risk our diplomatic standing, our lives, by harboring six Americans because it's the right thing to do." Because of that, their lives were saved."

After his death, The Washington Post described Taylor as the "main hero" of the Iran hostage escape, quoting former president Jimmy Carter in doing so. In 1981, Taylor was presented with the Congressional Gold Medal by President Ronald Reagan. Nonetheless, the significance of his role was downplayed in the film.

=== British and New Zealand roles ===
Upon its release in October 2012, the film was criticized for its suggestion that British and New Zealand embassies had turned away the American diplomats in Tehran. In fact both embassies, together with the Canadians, helped the Americans. The British had initially hosted the American diplomats; however, the location was deemed unsafe as the British embassy itself had been targeted and surrounded by mobs and all involved officials from the various nations believed the Canadian ambassador's residence to be a safer location.

New Zealand diplomats organized a place for the diplomats to hide if they needed to change their location, and drove the Americans to the airport when they made their escape from Tehran. British diplomats also assisted other American hostages beyond the escaped group of six. Bob Anders, the U.S. consular agent played in the film by Tate Donovan, said, "They put their lives on the line for us. We were all at risk. I hope no one in Britain will be offended by what's said in the film. The British were good to us and we're forever grateful."

Sir John Graham, the then-British ambassador to Iran, said:

My immediate reaction on hearing about this was one of outrage. I have since simmered down, but am still very distressed that the film-makers should have got it so wrong. My concern is that the inaccurate account should not enter the mythology of the events in Tehran in November 1979."

The then-British chargé d'affaires in Tehran said that, had the Americans been discovered in the British embassy, "I can assure you we'd all have been for the high jump." British diplomats Martin Williams, secretary to Sir John Graham in Iran at the time—searching for them in his own British car (the only Austin Maxi in Iran)—and Gordon Pirie—following in the embassy's Land Rover—found the Americans and first sheltered them in Williams' house.

Affleck is quoted as saying to The Sunday Telegraph: "I struggled with this long and hard, because it casts Britain and New Zealand in a way that is not totally fair. But I was setting up a situation where you needed to get a sense that these six people had nowhere else to go. It does not mean to diminish anyone." On March 12, 2013, the New Zealand House of Representatives censured Affleck by unanimously agreeing to the following motion, initiated by New Zealand First leader Winston Peters:

... this House acknowledge[s] with gratitude the efforts of former New Zealand diplomats Chris Beeby and Richard Sewell in assisting American hostages in Tehran during the hostage crisis in 1979, and express[es] its regret that the director of the movie Argo saw fit to mislead the world about what actually happened during that crisis when, in reality, our courageous diplomats' inspirational actions were of significant help to the American hostages and deserve the factual and historical record to be corrected.

=== Imminent danger to the group ===
In the film, the diplomats face suspicious glances from Iranians whenever they go out in public, and appear close to being caught at many steps along the way to their freedom. In reality, the diplomats never appeared to be in imminent danger. Taylor's wife bought three sets of plane tickets from three different airlines ahead of time, without any issues.

- The film depicts a dramatic last-minute cancellation of the mission by the Carter administration and Mendez declaring he will proceed with the mission. Carter delayed authorization by only 30 minutes, and that was before Mendez had left Europe for Iran.
- The film portrays a tense situation when the crew tries to board the plane, and their identities are nearly discovered. No such confrontation with security officials took place at the departure gate.
- The film has a dramatic chase sequence as the plane takes off; this did not occur. As Mark Lijek described it, "Fortunately for us, there were very few Revolutionary Guards in the area. It is why we turned up for a flight at 5.30 in the morning; even they weren't zealous enough to be there that early. The truth is the immigration officers barely looked at us and we were processed out in the regular way. We got on the flight to Zurich and then we were taken to the US ambassador's residence in Bern. It was that straightforward."

=== Other inaccuracies ===
The film contains other historical inaccuracies:

- The screenplay does not include the six days Bob Anders, Mark and Cora Lijek and Joe and Kathy Stafford were on the run before taking refuge with the Canadians nor where Lee Schatz was until he joined the group at John and Zena Sheardown's home.
- The screenplay has the escapees—Mark and Cora Lijek, Bob Anders, Lee Schatz, and Joe and Kathy Stafford—settling down to enforced cohabitation at the residence of the Canadian ambassador Ken Taylor. In reality, the group of five (Lee Schatz joined the Lijeks and Bob Anders about ten days later) was split between the Taylor house and the home of another Canadian official, John Sheardown and his wife Zena. It was in fact the friendship between Bob Anders and John Sheardown that led Bob to call John to seek sanctuary for the group when the haven with Thai cook Sam (Somchai) began to unravel. John's response to Bob was, "Why didn't you call sooner?"
- "It's not true we could never go outside. John Sheardown's house had an interior courtyard with a garden and we could walk there freely," Mark Lijek says.
- Lester Siegel, played by Alan Arkin, is not a real person. His name and some contribution are based on Robert Sidell while his personality is based on that of Jack Warner.
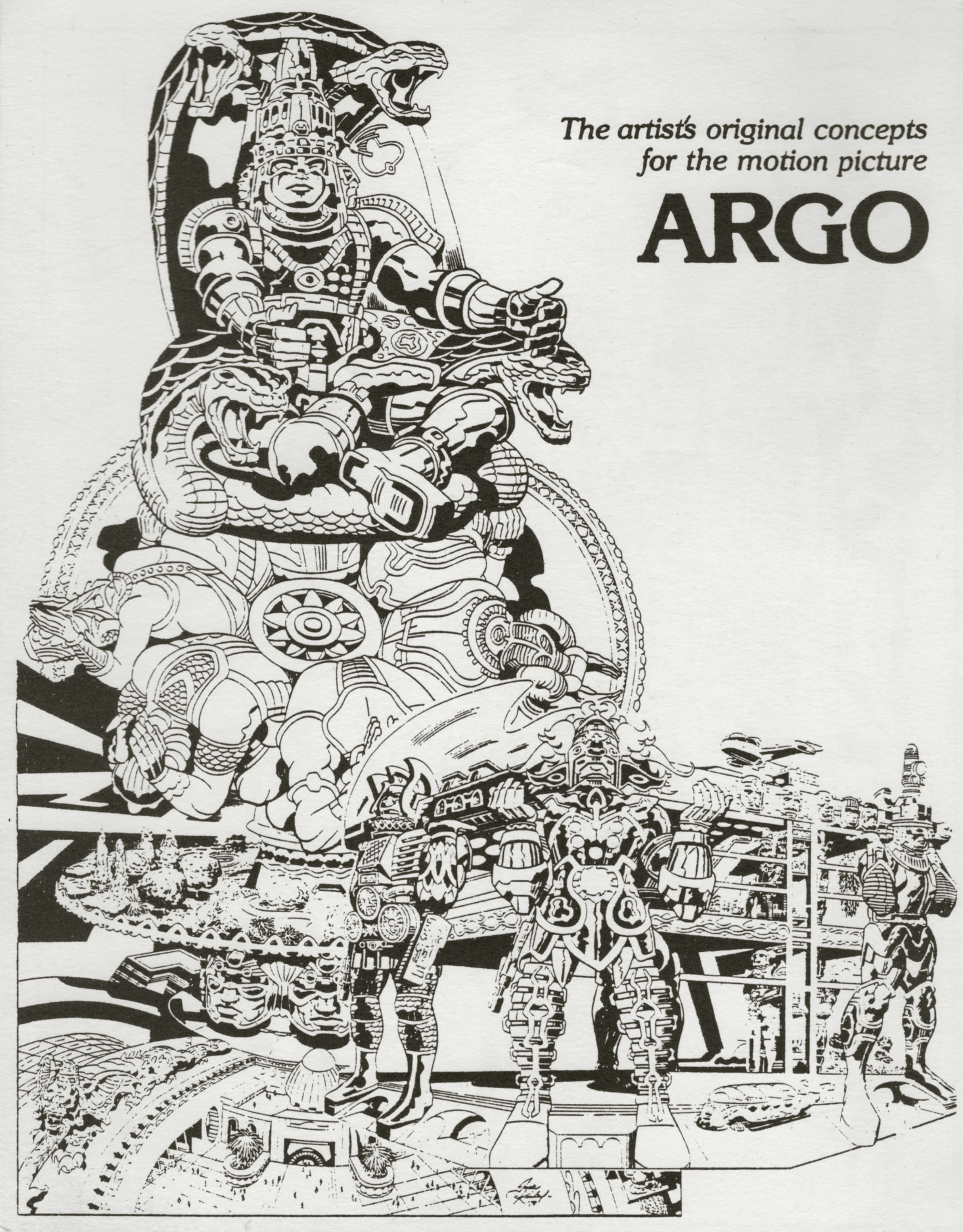
  Concept art for Lord of Light by Jack Kirby
- In the depiction of a frantic effort by CIA headquarters, in Langley, to get President Jimmy Carter to re-authorize the mission so that previously purchased airline tickets would still be valid, a CIA officer is portrayed as getting the White House telephone operator to connect him to Chief of Staff Hamilton Jordan by impersonating a representative of the school attended by Jordan's children. In reality, Jordan was unmarried and had no children at the time.
- The film depicts Mendez discovering the script with the title of Argo. In reality the script was titled Lord of Light, based on the book of the same name by Roger Zelazny. The CIA changed the title to Argo.
- Comic book artist Jack Kirby did not do storyboard work for the fabricated CIA film production. Kirby created concept art for a proposed production of Lord of Light a few years before the Iranian hostage situation.
- The Hollywood Sign is shown dilapidated as it had been in the 1970s. The sign had been repaired in 1978, two years before the events described in the film.
- The Swissair flight that took Mendez and the hostage group out of Tehran is shown operated with a Boeing 747-300, a type which entered service in 1983, and is painted in a livery that Swissair introduced in 1980. In real life, the group departed Iran on a Swissair Douglas DC-8 coincidentally named "Aargau".

== See also ==
- Escape from Iran: The Canadian Caper, a 1981 television film about the "Canadian Caper".
- On Wings of Eagles, a 1983 novel by Ken Follett, about Ross Perot's successful rescue of several of his employees from Iran just after the revolution.
- Timeline of the Iranian hostage crisis
