= Diana Barrington =

British actress (born 1939)

- Born: May 6, 1939 (age 87)
- Other name: Dina Barrington
- Education: Royal Academy of Dramatic Art
- Years active: 1957–2002
- Spouse: Ken Pogue (–2015; his death)

Diana Barrington (born 6 May 1939) is a British actress. She studied drama at the Royal Academy of Dramatic Art. She was married to Canadian actor Ken Pogue until his death in 2015.

== Career ==
Barrington worked at the Birmingham Repertory Theatre in 1957, and was part of the York repertory company from 1961-62. In 1962 she appeared in Alastair Dennett's play Fit to Print, as part of the Peter Haddon Company then resident at the Wimbledon Theatre.

In 1963, Barrington was part of the Alexandra Repertory Company at The Alexandra, Birmingham; she appeared in plays including Fish Out of Water by Derek Benfield, Noël Coward's Hay Fever, Jean Anouilh's Becket and W. Somerset Maugham's The Constant Wife.

In 1964, she appeared at the Royal Court Theatre in Edgar Wallace's On The Spot. Later in the year she appeared in Elmer Blaney Harris's Johnny Belinda at the Theatre Royal, Bath.

In 1965, she was in GC Brown's A Summer Game, with the Repertory Players at the Savoy Theatre.

In 1971, Barrington played Hippolyta / Titania in A Midsummer Night's Dream at the Neptune Theatre, Halifax, Nova Scotia.

In 1978, Barrington appeared as Mary, Queen of Scots in Schiller's Mary Stuart. In the same year, she played Fanny Wilton in Ibsen's John Gabriel Borkman.

In 1981, Barrington played two roles in the Shakespeare Festival at Stratford-upon-Avon.

In 1982, she was in The Elephant Man at Theatre Calgary in Alberta, Canada.

In 1989, Jay Scott raved about her performance in The Top of His Head.

Sometime before 1996, Barrington notified Equity that she was taking a break from acting, and as of 2005 she had not returned to the profession.

== Filmography ==
=== Film ===
| Year | Title | Role | Notes |
|---|---|---|---|
| 1979 | Lost and Found | Ellie | |
| 1981 | Escape from Iran: The Canadian Caper | Zena Sheardown | TV film |
| 1989 | The Top of His Head | Yolanda | |
| 1989 | Mob Story | Maria | |
| 1993 | Alive | Mrs. Alfonsin | |

=== Television ===
| Year | Title | Role | Notes |
|---|---|---|---|
| 1959 | Saturday Playhouse | | Episode: "The Larford Lad" |
| 1961 | Dixon of Dock Green | Sylvie Dowson | Episode: "A Quiet, Ordinary Woman" |
| 1963 | William | Roxana | Episode: "William and the Three Bears" |
| 1967 | Festival | Yerma | Episode: "Yerma" |
| 1969 | Festival | Celia | Episode: "Volpone" |
| 1973 | The Starlost | Janice | Episode: "The Pisces" |
| 1974 | The National Dream | Lady Dufferin | Mini-series documentary |
| 1979 | Matt and Jenny | Mrs. Bellini | Episode: "The Bellinis" |
| 1984 | The Littlest Hobo | Maid | Episode: "Three Monkeys of Bah Roghar" |
| 1985 | The Edison Twins | Female Judge | Episode: "Let Them Eat Cake" |
| 1987 | Check It Out! | Molly Maguire | Episode: "The Son Also Rises" |
| 1987 | Adderly | Juliana Doubleday | Episode: "Headhunter" |
| 1988 | Friday the 13th: The Series | Marie Simmons | Episode: "The Baron's Bride" |
| 1988 | Diamonds | | Episode: "Ghost Writer" |
| 1993 | Highlander: The Series | Anne Wheeler | Episode: "Eyewitness" |
| 1997 | Pacific Blue | Lana Brighton (as Dina Barrington) | Episode: "Rumplestiltskin" |
| 1998 | The Wayans Bros. | Stacy (as Dina Barrington) | Episode: "The Rich Girl" |
| 1999 | Total Recall 2070 | McCall (as Dina Barrington) | Episode: "Brain Fever" |
| 2001-2002 | A Nero Wolfe Mystery | Belinda Reade (as Dina Barrington); Belinda Reade (as Dina Barrington); Lucy Morgan (as Dina Barrington); Dinah Hough (as Dina Barrington); Dinah Hough (as Dina Barrington) | 5 episodes |
