= Canadian Caper =

1980 rescue of US diplomats from Iran

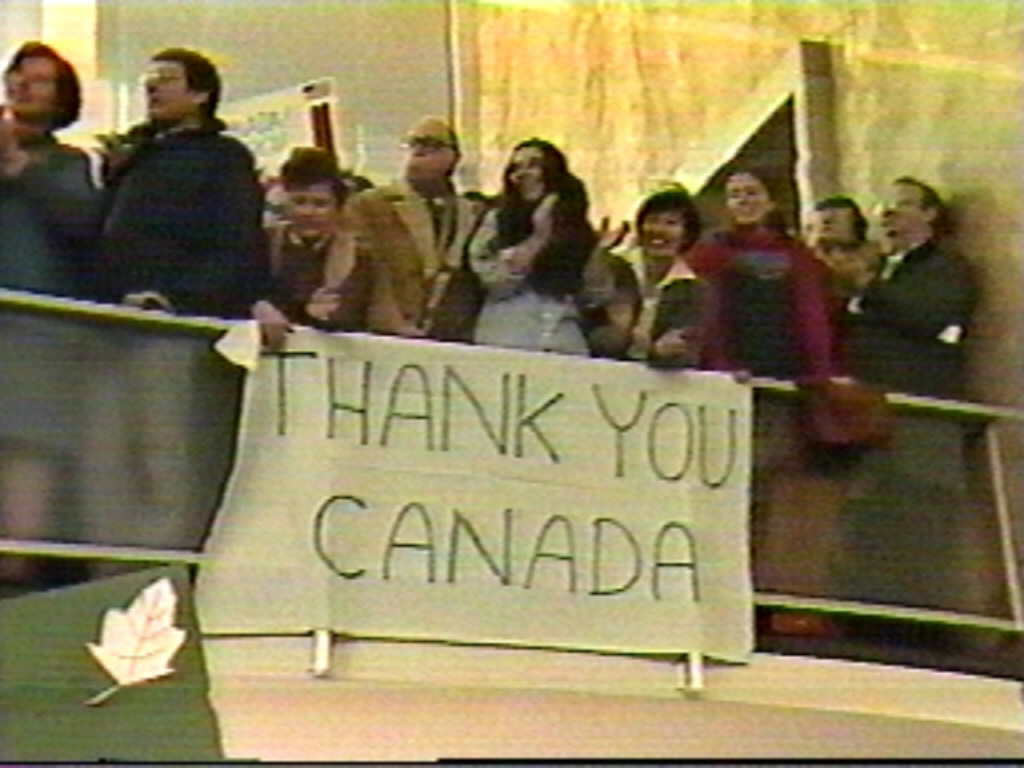
Americans were grateful for Canadian aid in sheltering and rescuing American diplomats during the Iran hostage crisis of 1980.

The "Canadian Caper" was the joint covert rescue by the Government of Canada and the US Central Intelligence Agency (CIA) of six American diplomats who had evaded capture during the seizure of the United States embassy in Tehran, Iran, on November 4, 1979, after the Iranian Revolution, when Islamist students took most of the American embassy personnel hostage, demanding the return of the US-backed Shah for trial.

After the diplomats had been sheltered by the British mission and Canadian diplomatic personnel, the Canadian and United States governments worked on a strategy to gain their escape through subterfuge and use of Canadian passports. The "caper" involved two CIA officers (Tony Mendez and his colleague Ed Johnson) joining the six diplomats in Tehran to form a fake film crew. It was purportedly made up of six Canadians, one Irishman and one Latin American, who were finishing scouting for an appropriate location to shoot a scene for the science-fiction film Argo, production of which had in fact been abandoned. On the morning of Sunday, January 27, 1980, the full eight-person party passed through passport control at Mehrabad Airport in Tehran, boarded a Swissair flight to Zürich and escaped Iran.

An article written about these events was published in Wired in 2007. The article was used loosely—alongside a memoir Mendez wrote—by Chris Terrio as the basis of the 2012 film Argo.

On September 14, 2023, as part of the season finale of The Langley Files podcast, the CIA disclosed the identity of "Julio" to be Ed Johnson, a linguist and expert in extractions.

== Background ==
When the Islamic Iranian Revolution occurred, the US-backed Shah of Iran, Mohammad Reza Pahlavi, fled the country. Amid the turmoil, a mob of young Islamists, known as the Muslim Student Followers of the Imam's Line, stormed the US Embassy in Tehran on November 4, 1979, capturing dozens of diplomats and holding them hostage. They demanded the return of the Shah to Iran for trial. The provisional government fell shortly thereafter, when Prime Minister Mehdi Bazargan and his cabinet resigned.

Although the new Iranian government stated that the hostage-takers were students acting on their own, it joined in demands for the return of the Shah. Most of the hostages were held until early 1981.

== Sanctuary for diplomats ==
Two groups of U.S. diplomats were able to leave the embassy compound during the assault.

These diplomats were not located in the chancellery - the main object of the attack - but in the U.S. consulate, a separate building in the compund that had direct access to the street.

One group, led by Consul General Richard Morefield, left the building but were confronted by rioters, captured, and returned to the compound. There they were grouped with the other hostages.

Five consulate staffers - Robert Anders, Cora Amburn-Lijek, Mark Lijek, Joseph Stafford, and Kathleen Stafford - left the building along with two Americans who had been there seeking consular services. The Anders group approached the British embassy as they had been instructed to do, but when they got there saw a huge crowd of Iranian demonstrators in their path. They changed course - Robert Anders brought the others to his own home, as he lived nearby.

Over a six-day odyssey, the Anders group, aided by Thai cook Somchai "Sam" Sriweawnetr, moved from house to house, including one night spent at the British residential compound. After three days, the Bazargan government fell, and the diplomats realized the ordeal would not be over quickly. Looking for options, Anders contacted his old friend John Sheardown, a Canadian immigration officer, and received an enthusiastic invitation for the entire group. On November 10, the five members of the original Anders group (Anders, the Lijeks and the Staffords) arrived at the Sheardown residence. There they were greeted by Canadian Ambassador Ken Taylor, who agreed to host the Staffords at his own home, which he shared with his wife Patricia (Pat). The Lijeks and Anders stayed with Sheardown and his wife Zena.

On November 27, Taylor received a call from the Swedish ambassador Kaj Sundberg, asking him to take in American Lee Schatz, an agricultural attache who had worked in a building across the street from the embassy. After transmitting his observations of the embassy assault from his office, Schatz had fled, first sleeping on the floor at the Swedish embassy and later staying at the apartment of Swedish consul Cecilia Lithander. However, the Swedish ambassador felt Schatz could better impersonate a Canadian than a Swede. Taylor agreed, and added Schatz to the group in the Sheardown residence.

Two "friendly-country" embassy officials assisted as well, and an unoccupied diplomatic residence was used for several weeks.

Taylor contacted Flora MacDonald, Canadian Secretary of State for External Affairs, and Canadian prime minister Joe Clark for assistance. They expressed support for the sheltering effort, and contacted the U.S. State Department, which brought in planners from the US Central Intelligence Agency.

== Preparation ==
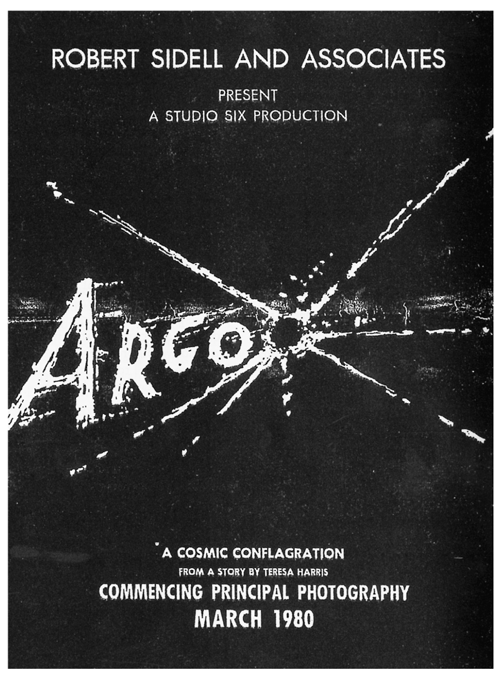
Movie poster created by the CIA as part of the cover story

The operation to extract the six American refugees was prepared in collaboration between Canadian and U.S. officials.

The CIA enlisted two disguise and exfiltration experts, Tony Mendez and Ed Johnson to provide a cover story, documents, appropriate clothing, and materials to change their appearances. Mendez and Johnson had previously worked together in the CIA's Office of Technical Service (OTS) branch. Mendez and Johnson chose an international flight as their method of exit because the CIA had already moved one agent out of Tehran in that manner, and thus were familiar with security procedures of the Iranian airport personnel and officers.

The CIA debated whether to issue the six diplomats U.S. passports with false identities, or ask the Canadian government to provide documents. Under Canadian law, it was illegal to issue passports with false information. And Mendez later wrote that he and Johnson "did not think Ottawa would be willing to put Canadian citizens and facilities in Iran in the increased danger they would face if the true purpose and American use of the passports were exposed."

The CIA resolved to discuss the matter with the Canadian government, but before they did, Canadian prime minister Clark authorized the issuance of authentic Canadian passports to the six American fugitives. Clark oversaw a secret Order-in-Council to grant the six an exemption to the passport law.

The Canadian and American intelligence officers discussed various options for cover stories for the American diplomats. In one scenario, the diplomats would be unemployed teachers looking for work. In another, they were food economists traveling to third-world coutries. As a third idea, Mendez put together an audacious cover story: the six refugees would pose as members of a Hollywood crew scouting movie locations. He ran the idea past his Canadian counterpart, who agreed it could work.

To make the cover believable, Mendez and Johnson enlisted the help of John Chambers, a veteran Hollywood make-up artist. They established a functioning office at Sunset Gower Studios on Sunset Boulevard, named "Studio Six Productions" (a nod to the six diplomats). It used office space that actor Michael Douglas had recently used while making the film The China Syndrome (1979). Telephones to the "Studio Six" office in Los Angeles were manned by staffers, in the event that anyone called to check the company's legitimacy.

For a film project, Mendez needed a story that would justify the subterfuge of scouting locations in Iran. He selected a stalled production of a film called Lord of Light, based on the 1967 Roger Zelazny science fiction novel of the same name, because the story was set on a planet with a Middle-Eastern feel. The original Lord of Light project, produced by Barry Geller, had begun development; Jack Kirby had created concept art, and a script had been completed. But the project had been abandoned in November 1979, before the start of filming. Mendez renamed the film Argo in a sly reference to a coarse knock-knock joke Chambers liked to tell, and announced to the film press that production would soon be getting underway.

Display ads for the upcoming "Studio Six" film were placed in Hollywood publications. The team also prepared fake business cards, held a film party at a nightclub in Los Angeles, and took out early advertisements for the film in Variety and The Hollywood Reporter industry magazines. Robert Sidell, a friend of Chambers and also a makeup artist, posed as a film producer at related events, while his wife Joan performed as the receptionist at "Studio Six".

As the weeks passed during this preparation, the American diplomats read and played games, mainly cards and Scrabble. Taylor worked to fly out non-essential Canadian embassy personnel. Taylor sent others on fake errands, both to establish erratic patterns and to case airport procedures. Tension rose as suspicious telephone calls and other activity indicated that the concealment of the diplomats might have been discovered.

Mendez flew to Germany, where he joined Johnson, and each obtained a visa to visit Iran, using their cover identities. At the last minute, their trip to Tehran was briefly delayed, because President Carter wanted a full briefing and to approve the mission personally.

== Rescue ==
Mendez and Johnson flew to Tehran from Germany on January 25, 1980.

The Canadian government forwarded the passports and other supporting material to their embassy in Tehran through a diplomatic courier. A mistake had been made in dating the visas, as the Iranian year begins at the spring equinox, and the date of issue was actually well in the future. One of the Canadian embassy officers spotted the mistake while checking the documents. Fortunately, extra passports had been included, so Mendez and Johnson were able to forge new visa stamps with dates based on the Iranian calendar.

Upon meeting with the six hidden diplomats at the home of John Sheardown, Mendez presented them with the three cover story options and allowed them to choose the one they preferred. The diplomats chose the movie production cover.

Early on the morning of Sunday, January 27, Mendez, Johnson, and the six American diplomats, traveling with their real Canadian passports and forged entry documents, arrived at Tehran's Mehrabad International Airport. As part of her cover materials, Cora Lijek was carrying a newspaper in which advertisements for Argo had been published.

The Canadians closed their embassy the same day. Ambassador Taylor and the remaining staff returned to Canada. They had sheltered the American refugees for a total of 79 days.

At the airport, the American group passed smoothly through security, but experienced a brief but tense delay because of mechanical difficulties with the McDonnell Douglas DC-8-62. At last the group boarded Swissair flight 363 (Registration: HB-IDL) for Zürich, Switzerland. By coincidence, the aircraft was named Aargau, after the Aargau Swiss canton. The plane took off without incident and flew to Switzerland.

Upon landing in Zürich, the six diplomats were taken by CIA operatives to a mountain lodge safe house for the night. There, they were told that, for diplomatic purposes, they would not be able to talk to the press and that they would be kept hidden in a secret location in Florida until the hostage situation was resolved.

The next day, the story broke in Montreal, in an article written by Jean Pelletier, Washington correspondent for La Presse. Pelletier had uncovered some of the facts concerning the escaped diplomats while they were still in hiding in Tehran, but he did not publish the story so as not to risk their safety. Several other news organizations also possessed some elements of the story. Pelletier's article ran on January 29 as soon as he was informed that the escapees had left Iran. It was quickly picked up by the international press.

Mendez and Johnson left Switzerland and continued to Frankfurt, West Germany, where Mendez wrote his after-action report. The CIA drove the six diplomats from Switzerland to the US Ramstein Air Base in West Germany to be flown across the Atlantic to Dover Air Force Base in Delaware. They arrived in the United States on January 30, 1980.

The six rescued American diplomats arrive at the U.S. State Department, February 1, 1980

Pelletier's exposure of the operation resulted in the U.S. abandoning their plans to sequester the six Americans for the duration of the hostage drama. On February 1, all six were welcomed home at a public event at the U.S. State Department. Later on the same day, they met with President Carter in the Oval Office.

The Argo story was blown, but both the Canadian and U.S. governments concealed the CIA's role in order to avoid retribution against the remaining American hostages by their captors. The CIA's full involvement was not revealed until 1997, when the agency declassified the records.

President Jimmy Carter meets in the Oval Office with six American diplomats recently rescued from revolutionary Tehran

President Jimmy Carter had officially maintained for negotiation purposes that all of the missing American diplomats were held hostage, so the news about six being rescued came as a complete surprise to the public. American gratitude for the Canadians' actions was displayed widely and by numerous American television figures and ordinary citizens alike, who particularly recognized Taylor for gratitude. The Canadian flag was flown in many locations across the United States, and ads were taken out on "Thank You" billboards.

The six rescued American diplomats:

- Robert G. Anders, 54 – consular officer
- Mark J. Lijek, 29 – consular officer
- Cora A. Lijek, 25 – consular assistant
- Henry L. Schatz, 31 – agricultural attaché
- Joseph D. Stafford, 29 – consular officer
- Kathleen F. Stafford, 28 – consular assistant

The Canadians involved in the rescue were appointed to the Order of Canada, Canada's second-highest civilian award. They included:

- Ambassador Taylor and his wife Patricia Taylor
- Immigration officer John Sheardown and his wife Zena Sheardown
- Mary Catherine O'Flaherty – communications officer
- Roger Lucy – political officer and first secretary for the Canadian Embassy.
- Laverna Katie Dollimore – personal secretary for Ambassador Taylor

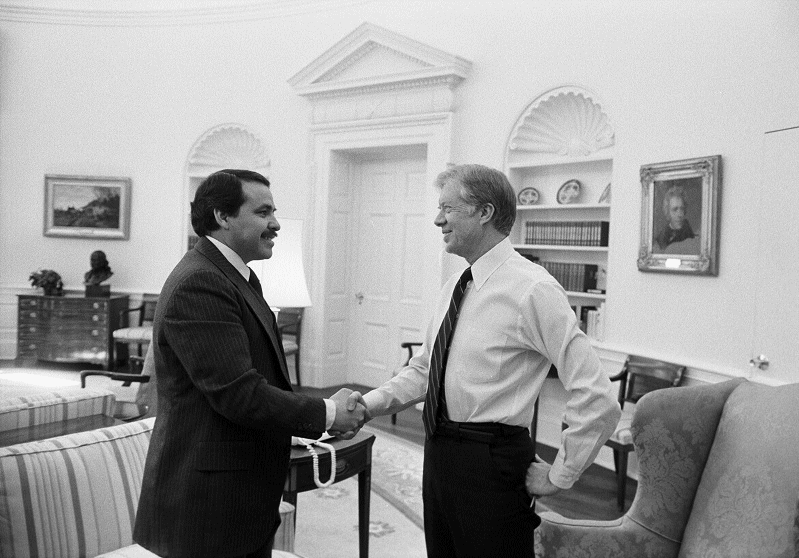
Agent Tony Mendez is congratulated by President Jimmy Carter on the success of Operation Argo

Zena Sheardown, a British subject born in Guyana, would normally have been ineligible for the Order. Flora MacDonald intervened to ensure that she was awarded honorary membership, later converted to full membership when she became a Canadian citizen. Ambassador Taylor was subsequently awarded the Congressional Gold Medal by the United States Congress for his critical assistance to the United States.

John Chambers was later awarded CIA's Intelligence Medal of Merit for his help in the operation.

== In popular culture ==
In 1981, a television movie about the Canadian Caper was made, Escape from Iran: The Canadian Caper, directed by Lamont Johnson, with Kenneth D. Taylor played by Gordon Pinsent. The movie was filmed in and around Toronto, and was an American-Canadian co-production. A children's illustrated book about the event was written by 2013 Eric Hoffer Award–winner Laura Scandiffio and Stephen MacEachern, entitled Escapes!

The critically and commercially successful film Argo, based on this event, was released in North American cinemas on October 12, 2012. In the film, the role of John Sheardown and his wife Zena were omitted for reasons of length and cost. The film includes elements of both fact and fiction. In particular, the film focuses largely on the role the CIA played in the operation and minimizes the extended involvement of the Canadians, and their share of strategy and preparation. Former President Jimmy Carter acknowledged this in an interview in 2013, while also praising the film. In addition, the film incorrectly states that the six American diplomats had been turned away by the British and New Zealand embassies. The American diplomats spent one night in a British diplomatic compound before it became obvious that the militants were searching for the diplomats and had confronted the British embassy. All of the diplomats involved agreed that the residence of the Canadian Ambassador would be better suited to sheltering them.

Other dramatic inventions for the film include the visit to the Grand Bazaar of Tehran, the cancellation of the operation on the eve of departure, the interrogation at the airport, and the runway chase by the airport security officers. In truth, the operation went smoothly, and the Americans were never seriously challenged as they exited the country.

Argo won three Oscars, including Best Picture, at the 85th Academy Awards on February 24, 2013.

Historian Robert Wright also covered these events in his book Our Man in Tehran (2010). A companion documentary film of the same title was released in 2013. The British docudrama television series Banged Up Abroad featured the story in 2014 as the focus of its Series 9 episode The Real Argo.
