= List of places in California (E) =

List of places in California - E

This list of current:

- cities
- towns, unincorporated communities
- counties, and other recognized places in the U.S. state of California.

Information on the number and names of counties in which the place lies, and its lower and upper ZIP Code bounds, if applicable are also included.

Name of place	Number of counties	Principal county	Lower zip code	Upper zip code
Eagle Mountain	1	Riverside County	92239	
Eagle Rock	1	Los Angeles County	90041	
Eagles Nest	1	San Diego County		
Eaglet	1	San Luis Obispo County		
Eagle Tree	1	San Joaquin County	95690	
Eagleville	1	Modoc County	96110	
Earlimart	1	Tulare County	93219	
Earp	1	San Bernardino County	92242	
East Acres	1	Madera County	93622	
East Alta Loma	1	San Bernardino County		
East Antioch	1	Contra Costa County		
East Applegate	1	Placer County	95703	
East Arboga	1	Yuba County		
East Arcadia	1	Los Angeles County	91006	
East Bakersfield	1	Kern County	93305	
East Biggs	1	Butte County		
East Blythe	1	Riverside County	92225	
East Compton	1	Los Angeles County	90221	
Easter Cross	1	San Diego County		
East Farmersville	1	Tulare County	93223	
East Firebaugh	1	Madera County	93637	
East Foothills	1	Santa Clara County	95127	
East Garrison	1	Monterey County	93941	
Eastgate	1	Los Angeles County	90211	
East Gate	1	Riverside County	92388	
East Gridley	1	Butte County	95948	
East Guernewood	1	Sonoma County	95446	
East Hemet	1	Riverside County	92544	
East Highlands	1	San Bernardino County	92346	
East Hopland	1	Mendocino County	95449	
East La Mirada	1	Los Angeles County		
East Long Beach	1	Los Angeles County	90804	
East Los Angeles	1	Los Angeles County	90022	
East Lynwood	1	Los Angeles County	90262	
East Modesto	1	Stanislaus County	95350	
East Mojave	1	Kern County		
Eastmont	1	Alameda County	94605	
East Newport	1	Orange County		
East Nicolaus	1	Sutter County	95622	
East Oakdale	1	Stanislaus County		
Easton	1	Fresno County	93706	
East Orosi	1	Tulare County	93647	
East Palo Alto	1	Santa Clara County	94303	
East Pasadena	1	Los Angeles County	91107	
East Pleasanton	1	Alameda County		
Eastport	1	Contra Costa County		
East Porterville	1	Tulare County	93257	
East Quincy	1	Plumas County	95971	
East Rancho Dominguez	1	Los Angeles County	90221	
East Redbanks	1	Tulare County		
East Richmond Heights	1	Contra Costa County		
East San Bruno	1	San Mateo County		
East San Gabriel	1	Los Angeles County		
East San Pedro	1	Los Angeles County		
East Santa Cruz	1	Santa Cruz County	95062	
East Shore	1	Plumas County		
East Side	1	San Joaquin County		
Eastside Acres	1	Madera County	93622	
Eastside Ranch	1	Madera County	93622	
East Sonora	1	Tuolumne County		
East Stockton	1	San Joaquin County	95205	
East Tulare	1	Tulare County	93274	
East Tustin	1	Orange County	92705	
Eastvale	1	Riverside County	91752	92880
East Vallejo	1	Solano County	94590	
East Ventura	1	Ventura County	93003	
Eastview	1	Los Angeles County	90734	
East Whittier	1	Los Angeles County	90609	
East Windsor	1	Sonoma County		
Eaton	1	Monterey County		
Eberly	1	Alameda County		
Eblis	1	Santa Cruz County		
Echo Lake	1	El Dorado County	95721	
Echo Park	1	Los Angeles County	90026	
Eckley	1	Contra Costa County		
Edendale	1	Los Angeles County	90026	
Eden Gardens	1	San Diego County	92075	
Eden Hot Springs	1	Riverside County		
Edenvale	1	Santa Clara County		
Eder	1	Placer County		
Edgemar	1	San Mateo County	94044	
Edgemont	1	Lassen County	96114	
Edgemont	1	Riverside County	92508	
Edgemont Acres	1	Kern County	93523	
Edgewood	1	Siskiyou County	96094	
Edison	1	Kern County	93220	
Edmundson Acres	1	Kern County	93203	
Edna	1	San Luis Obispo County		
Edom	1	Riverside County		
Edwards	1	Kern County	93523	
Edwards Air Force Base	3	Kern County; Los Angeles County; San Bernardino County	93523	
Edwards Estates	1	Kern County	93523	
Edwards Palisades	1	Kern County	93523	
Eel Rock	1	Humboldt County	95554	
Eight Mile House	1	El Dorado County	95709	
El Bonita	1	Sonoma County	95446	
El Cajon	1	San Diego County	92019	22
El Camino	1	Tehama County	96035	
El Campo	1	Marin County		
El Casco	1	Riverside County		
El Centro	1	Imperial County	92243	
El Cerrito	1	Contra Costa County	94530	
El Cerrito	1	Riverside County	92881	
Elders Corner	1	Placer County	95603	
Elderwood	1	Tulare County	93286	
El Dorado	1	El Dorado County	95623	
El Dorado Hills	1	El Dorado County	95762	
Eldridge	1	Sonoma County	95431	
Electra	1	Amador County		
El Encanto Heights	1	Santa Barbara County	93117	
Elftman	1	Los Angeles County		
El Granada	1	San Mateo County	94018	
Elinor	1	Humboldt County		
Elizabeth Lake	1	Los Angeles County	93532	
Elk	1	Fresno County		
Elk	1	Mendocino County	95432	
Elk Creek	1	Glenn County	95939	
Elk Grove	1	Sacramento County	95624	95759
Elkhorn	1	Monterey County		
Elkhorn Village	1	Yolo County	95605	
Elk River	1	Humboldt County	95501	
Elk Valley Rancheria	1	Del Norte County		
Ellicott	1	Santa Cruz County		
Ellis	1	Riverside County		
Ellwood	1	Santa Barbara County	93118	
El Macero	1	Yolo County	95618	
Elmco	1	Tulare County		
Elmhurst	1	Alameda County	94603	
Elmira	1	Solano County	95625	
El Mirador	1	Tulare County		
El Mirage	1	San Bernardino County	92301	
Elmo	1	Kern County		
El Modena	1	Orange County	92669	
El Monte	1	Contra Costa County	94521	
El Monte	1	Los Angeles County	91731	34
Elm View	1	Fresno County	93609	
Elmwood	1	Alameda County	94705	
El Nido	1	Los Angeles County		
El Nido	1	Merced County	95317	
Elora	1	San Bernardino County		
El Paso de Robles	1	San Luis Obispo County	93446	
El Pinal	1	San Joaquin County		
El Portal	1	Mariposa County	95318	
El Porto Beach	1	Los Angeles County	90266	
El Pueblo	1	Contra Costa County	94565	
El Rio	1	Ventura County	93030	
El Rio Villa	1	Yolo County	95694	
El Roble	1	Mendocino County		
Elsa	1	Monterey County		
El Segundo	1	Los Angeles County	90245	
El Sereno	1	Los Angeles County	90032	
Elsinore	1	Riverside County		
El Sobrante (Contra Costa)	1	Contra Costa County	94803	
El Sobrante (Riverside)	1	Riverside County	94803	
El Sueno	1	Santa Barbara County		
El Toro	1	Orange County	92630	
Elvas	1	Sacramento County		
El Verano	1	Sonoma County	95433	
Elverta	1	Sacramento County	95626	
El Viejo	1	Stanislaus County	95354	
Elvira	1	San Diego County		
Emandal	1	Mendocino County	95490	
Emerald Bay	1	El Dorado County		
Emerald Bay	1	Orange County	92651	
Emerald Hills	1	San Mateo County		
Emerald Lake	1	San Mateo County	94061	
Emerald Lake Hills	1	San Mateo County		
Emeryville	1	Alameda County	94608	
Emigrant Gap	1	Placer County	95715	
Emmaton	1	Sacramento County		
Empire	1	Stanislaus County	95319	
Encanto	1	San Diego County	92114	
Enchanted Hills	1	Napa County		
Encinal	1	Santa Clara County	94087	
Encinal	1	Sutter County		
Encinitas	1	San Diego County	92024	
Encino	1	Los Angeles County	91316	
Engineer Springs	1	San Diego County		
Englewood	1	Humboldt County		
English Town	1	Santa Clara County		
Ennis	1	Riverside County		
Ensley	1	Sutter County		
Enson	1	Tulare County		
Enterprise	1	Amador County		
Enterprise	1	Lake County		
Enterprise	1	Shasta County	96001	
Enterprise Rancheria	1	Butte County	95965	
Epworth	1	Ventura County		
Erle	1	Yuba County		
Escalle	1	Marin County	94936	
Escalon	1	San Joaquin County	95320	
Escondido	1	San Diego County	92025	46
Escondido Junction	1	San Diego County	92054	
Esparto	1	Yolo County	95627	
Esperanza	1	Siskiyou County		
Essex	1	Humboldt County		
Essex	1	San Bernardino County	92332	
Estrella	1	San Luis Obispo County	93451	
Estudillo	1	Alameda County	94577	
Ethanac	1	Riverside County		
Etiwanda	1	San Bernardino County		
Etiwanda	1	San Bernardino County	91739	
Etna	1	Siskiyou County	96027	
Ettersburg	1	Humboldt County	95440	
Eucalyptus Hills	1	San Diego County	92040	
Euclid	1	Tulare County		
Eugene O'Neil National Historic Site	1	Contra Costa County	94507	
Eureka	1	Humboldt County	95501	03
Everglade	1	Sutter County		
Evergreen	1	Santa Clara County		
Evergreen Acres	1	Santa Barbara County	93455	
Ewing	1	Placer County		
Exeter	1	Tulare County	93221	
