= Edgemont =

Edgemont may refer to:

== Places ==
=== Canada ===
- Edgemont, Calgary, a large suburban neighbourhood in Calgary, Alberta
- Edgemont, Edmonton, a neighbourhood in Edmonton, Alberta
- Calgary-Edgemont, a federal electoral district in Alberta, Canada

=== United States ===
- Edgemont, Arkansas
- Edgemont Shelter (3VB6) Van Buren County, Arkansas; an archaeological site
- Edgemont, California (disambiguation), multiple locations
- Edgemont, Maryland
- Greenville, Westchester County, New York, commonly known as Edgemont
- Edgemont Historic District, Rocky Mount, North Carolina, listed on the NRHP in North Carolina
- Edgemont (Durham, North Carolina), a textile town established by Julian S. Carr in East Durham, circa 1900
- Edgemont Historic District, Rocky Mount, Edgecombe County, North Carolina
- Edgemont, Pennsylvania, a community in Susquehanna Township, Dauphin County, Pennsylvania, bordering the state capital of Harrisburg
- Edgemont, South Dakota

== Education ==
- Edgemont School District (South Dakota), in Edgemont, SD, USA
  - Edgemont High School, see Edgemont School District (South Dakota)
  - Edgemont Middle School, see Edgemont School District (South Dakota)
  - Edgemont Elementary School, see Edgemont School District (South Dakota)
- Edgemont Union Free School District, Westchester, New York State, USA
  - Edgemont Junior – Senior High School, Greenville, Westchester County, New York state, USA
- Edgemont Montessori School, Montclair, New Jersey, USA; see Montclair Public Schools

== Facilities and structures ==
- Edgemont Park (disambiguation), several parks
- Edgemont (Estes Park, Colorado), listed on the NRHP in Colorado, U.S.
- Edgemont (Langhorne, Pennsylvania), U.S., listed on the NRHP
- Edgemont (Covesville, Virginia), U.S., listed on the NRHP
- Edgemont (Marshall, Texas), listed on the NRHP in Texas, U.S.
- Edgemont Church, Christiansburg, Montgomery County, Virginia, U.S.
- Edgemont Street station, Media–Sharon Hill Line, SEPTA, Pennsylvania, U.S.
- Edgemont Village, North Vancouver, British Columbia, Canada; a commercial area

== Other uses ==
- Edgemont (TV series), produced by the Canadian Broadcasting Corporation from 2001 until 2005

== See also ==
- Edgemont Acres, California, USA
- Edgemont Ridge, Alberta, Canada
- Edgmont (disambiguation)
- Edgmond, England, UK
