= Edgemont School District =

Edgemont School District may refer to:

- Edgemont Union Free School District, New York State, USA
- Edgemont School District (South Dakota), USA
