= Edgemont, California =

Edgemont, California may refer to:

- Edgemont, Lassen County, California
- Edgemont, Riverside County, California

== See also ==
- Edgemont Acres, California
- Edgemont (disambiguation)
