= Spierer =

Spierer is a surname. Notable people with the surname include:

- Céline Spierer, Swiss screenwriter
- Lauren Spierer (born 1991), American missing person
