= Spoonville =

Spoonville may refer to:

- Spoonville, California, former name of Edgemont, Lassen County, California
- Spoonville, Georgia
- Spoonville, Michigan
