= Edgemon =

Edgemon is a surname. Notable people with the surname include:

- Luke Edgemon, singer

== See also ==
- Edgemont (disambiguation)
