= Edgmont =

Edgmont may refer to:

- Edgmont Township, Delaware County, Pennsylvania, USA
- Egmont (electoral district), Prince Edward Island, Canada; a federal riding

== See also ==
- Edgmond, Telford and Wrekin, Shropshire, England, UK; a village
- Edgemont (disambiguation)
- Edge (disambiguation)
- EDG (disambiguation)
