= Steve Liesman =

American economics and finance journalist

- Born: Steve Liesman; Bronxville, NY, USA
- Occupation: Reporter
- Notable credit: CNBC's Squawk on the Street among others
- Title: Senior Economics Reporter
- Spouse: Karen Fran Dukess
- Website: https://www.cnbc.com/steve-liesman/

Steve Liesman (born May 21, 1963) is an American journalist, senior economics reporter for the cable financial television channel CNBC. He is known for appearing on the CNBC programs Squawk Box and other business related topics on CNBC and NBC and using a paper "easel" while explaining the state of the United States economy.

Liesman won an Emmy Award for his coverage of the U.S. financial crisis. He shared the Pulitzer Prize for International Reporting in 1999, recognizing Wall Street Journal coverage of the Russian financial crisis. Liesman wrote the first story in the series, "Missteps by Moscow, New Asian Turmoil Set Off Russian Crisis" (June 5, 1998), and contributed to at least one other; the prize was presented to Andrew Higgins and Liesman.

== Biography ==
Liesman was born in Bronxville, New York, the son of Bernice "Bunny" and Marvin Liesman. Liesman attended Edgemont Junior – Senior High School in Edgemont, New York, received a bachelor's degree in English from the University at Buffalo, The State University of New York and a master's degree from the Columbia Graduate School of Journalism.

From August 1987 to June 1992, Liesman was a business reporter first at the Sarasota Herald-Tribune and later at the St. Petersburg Times. He moved to Moscow, Russia in August 1992 as founding business editor of The Moscow Times, the first English-language daily newspaper in Russia. He created the Moscow Times Index, the first stock index in Russia.

Liesman joined The Wall Street Journal in the Moscow bureau in 1994, and was named Moscow bureau chief in August 1996. He transferred to the New York bureau in May 1998 when he began covering the international oil and gas industry. He was named WSJ's senior economics reporter in June 2000. During his time at the WSJ, he focused on the productivity revolution, macroeconomics, and the myriad problems of corporate earnings reporting. Liesman became a senior economics reporter at the WSJ, covering domestic and global economies, as well as corporate earnings and the Enron accounting scandal, before joining CNBC in April 2002.

Liesman was a leader of the WSJ's team of reporters awarded the 1999 Pulitzer Prize in the international reporting category for in-depth analytical coverage of the Russian financial crisis. He received the first runner-up award in the 1998 SAIA - Novartis Prize for International Reporting for his four-part series, "Markets Under Siege" (the prize recognizes outstanding achievement in the coverage of international affairs).

Liesman received criticism for his Pulitzer in the Nation from journalists Matt Taibbi and Mark Ames, who believed that Liesman's overly optimistic economic outlook in the run-up to the Russian Financial Crisis was attributed to Liesman's sourcing from controversial figures such as Anatoly Chubais and others in favor of the ongoing privatization efforts in the country.

In addition to his duties as CNBC's senior economics reporter, Steve Liesman is an amateur guitarist and plays regularly in a Grateful Dead cover band. He also hosted the pay-per-view broadcast of the band's three "Fare Thee Well" concerts in Chicago in July.

== Personal life ==
In 1991, he married Karen Fran Dukess.
