= Edgemont Park =

Edgemont Park may refer to:

- Edgemont Park, Michigan
- Edgemont Park, Montclair, New Jersey
- Edgemont Park, Alabama in Jefferson County, Alabama

== See also ==
- Edgemont (disambiguation)
