= Bruce Lefkowitz =

American basketball player

Personal information
- Born: Scarsdale, New York, U.S.
- Listed height: 6 ft 8 in (2.03 m)

Career information
- High school: Edgemont (Scarsdale, New York)
- College: Penn (1983-1987)
- Position: Center

Career history
- 1987-1988: Philadelphia Aces

Career highlights
- Second team All-Ivy (1986); First team All-Ivy (1987)

Bruce Lefkowitz is an American former basketball player. He played college basketball for the Penn Quakers and professionally for the Philadelphia Aces. At Penn, he was a two-time All-Ivy League selection. He has been inducted into several athletic Hall of Fames.

== Early life ==
Lefkowitz is a native of Scarsdale, New York. Lefkowitz attended Edgemont Junior – Senior High School in Scarsdale. As of 2026, he is ranked third place on the Section 1 - Westchester and Rockland County all-time scoring list with 2,036 points in his high school career.

== College career ==
Lefkowitz played college basketball for the Penn Quakers from 1983 to 1987 and was one of the best Penn players of the 1980s. Across his entire 4 year college career at Penn, Lefkowitz averaged 13.9 points, 7.4 rebounds, and 1.3 assists per game in 104 games played and 53 starts for the Quakers. In Lefkowitz's senior year in 1986-87 he averaged a career high 18.7 points per game. In the 1985-86 season as a junior he earned second team All-Ivy League honors and in 1986-87 as a senior he was a first team All-Ivy League selection. He led Penn in scoring in both his junior and senior years.

One of the best players in Penn men's basketball history, Lefkowitz remains ranked 13th on the Penn basketball all-time scoring list with 1443 career points as of 2026. At the time of his graduation, he was ranked 5th in Penn history. His 58.7% field goal percentage remains 2nd all-time in Penn history as of 2026. A prolific free throw shooter, Lefkowitz is still ranked first all-time in career free throw makes at Penn. He led Penn in rebounding in all four years he was on the team, a record that stands at Penn as of 2022.

== Professional career ==
After graduating from Penn, Lefkowitz played for the Philadelphia Aces of the United States Basketball League.

== National team career ==
He won a gold medal while representing the United States at the 1985 Maccabiah Games.

== Honors ==
He is an inductee into the Philadelphia Jewish Sports Hall of Fame. Lefkowitz is a member of the Penn Athletics Hall of Fame, as part of Hall of Fame Class VIII inducted in May 2012. In 2009, he was inducted into the Westchester County (NY) Athletics Hall of Fame. He is also a member of the Edgemont High School Hall of Fame.

In 2022, it was announced that Lefkowitz would be inducted into the Philadelphia Big 5 Hall of Fame. In 2020, he was also announced as an Ivy League Basketball Legend, representing Penn in the fourth annual class.
