= EDG =

EDG may refer to:

== Science and medicine ==
- Electron donating group, a category in chemistry
- Electrodermograph, a measuring device for skin
- Elevational diversity gradient, an ecological pattern
- Endothelial differentiation gene, a family of integral membrane proteins

== Transport ==
- Eden Gardens railway station, in Kolkata, India
- Edge Hill railway station, in Liverpool, England
- Weide Army Airfield, in Maryland, United States

== Other uses ==
- Edison Design Group, an American software company
- Edward Gaming, a Chinese esports organization
- Emergency diesel generator, an independent source of electrical power
- European Democrats, a party group in the European Parliament
- European Democrat Group, a party group in the Council of Europe
