= Massenerhebung effect =

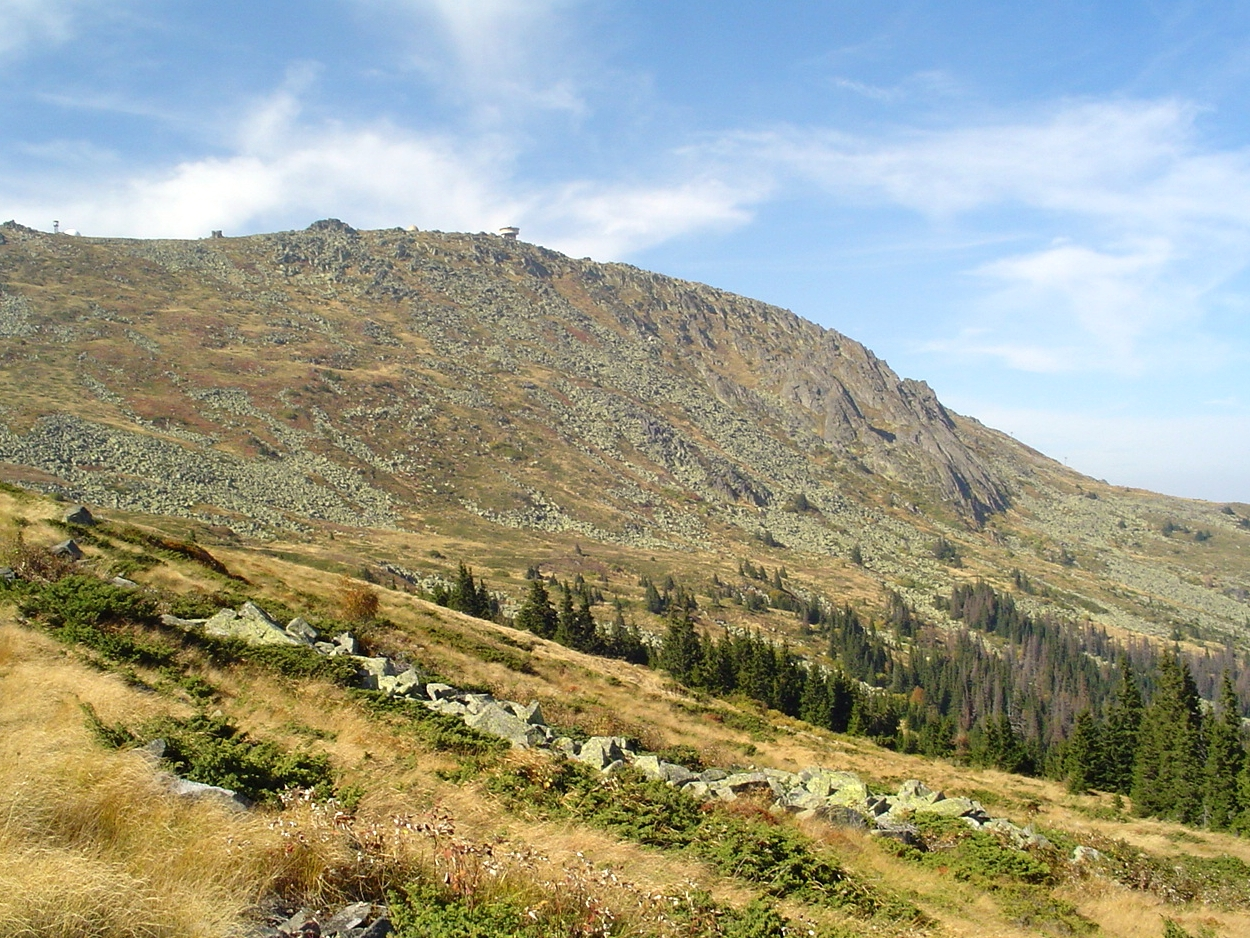

The Massenerhebung effect (German for "mountain mass elevation") describes variation in the tree line based on mountain size and location. In general, mountains surrounded by large ranges will tend to have higher tree lines than more isolated mountains due to heat retention and wind shadowing. This effect is important for determining weather patterns in mountainous regions, as regions of similar altitude and latitude may nonetheless have much warmer or colder climates based on surrounding mountain ranges.

For example, in Borneo, Gunung Palung, located on the coast, has moss forest at 900 m, while the montane forest on Gunung Mulu starts at 1200 m and at 1800 m on Mount Kinabalu.

== See also ==
- Altitudinal zonation
- Elevational diversity gradient
- Krummholz
