= El Nido, Los Angeles County, California =

Unincorporated community in California, United States

El Nido, California
- Unincorporated community
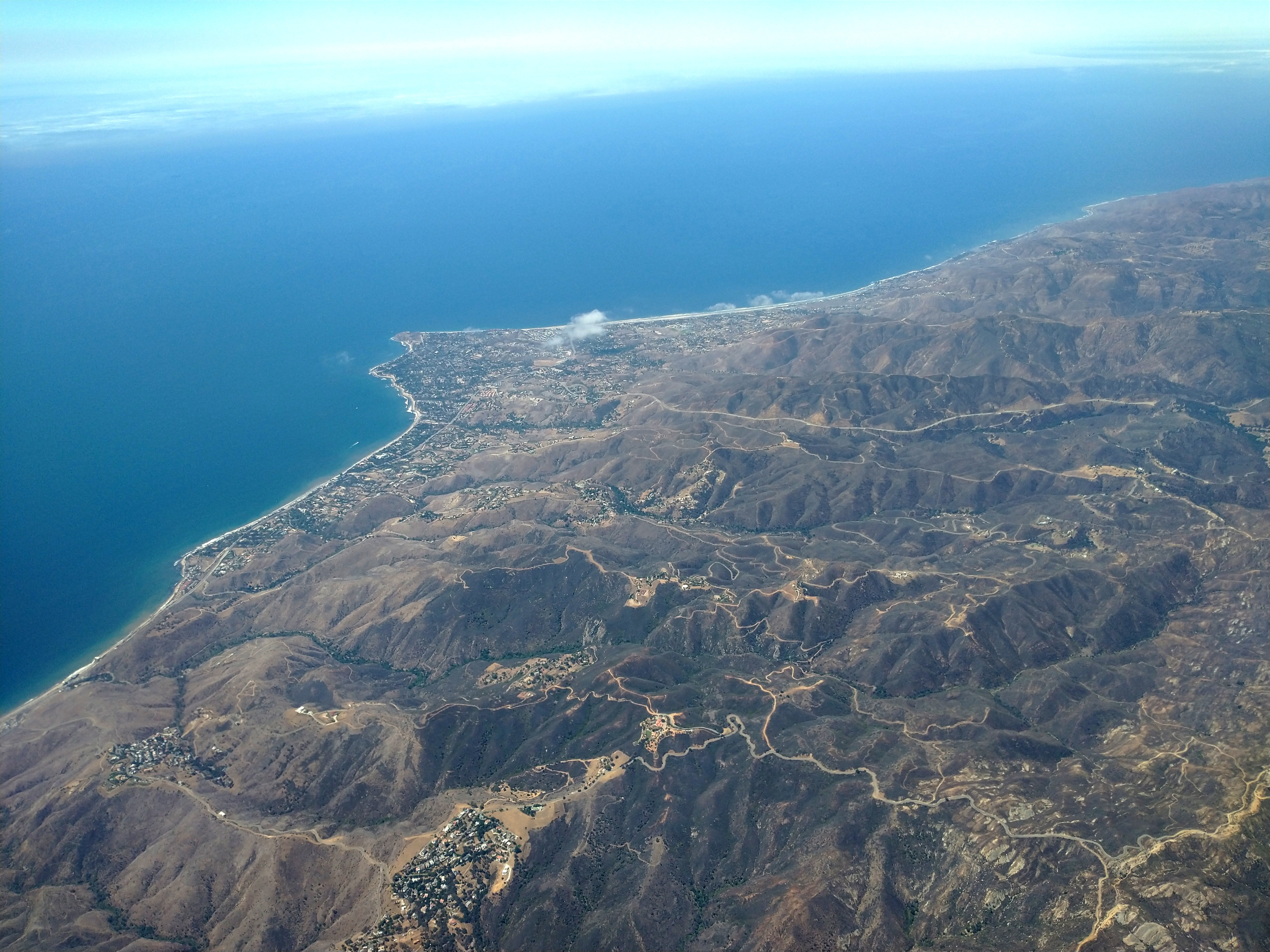
- Corral Canyon is in the bottom left, El Nido is the development in the canyon closer to the beach
- Interactive map of El Nido, California
- Coordinates: 34°02′37″N 118°44′21″W
- Country: United States
- State: California
- County: Los Angeles
- Elevation: 801 ft (244 m)
- GNIS feature ID: 1660598

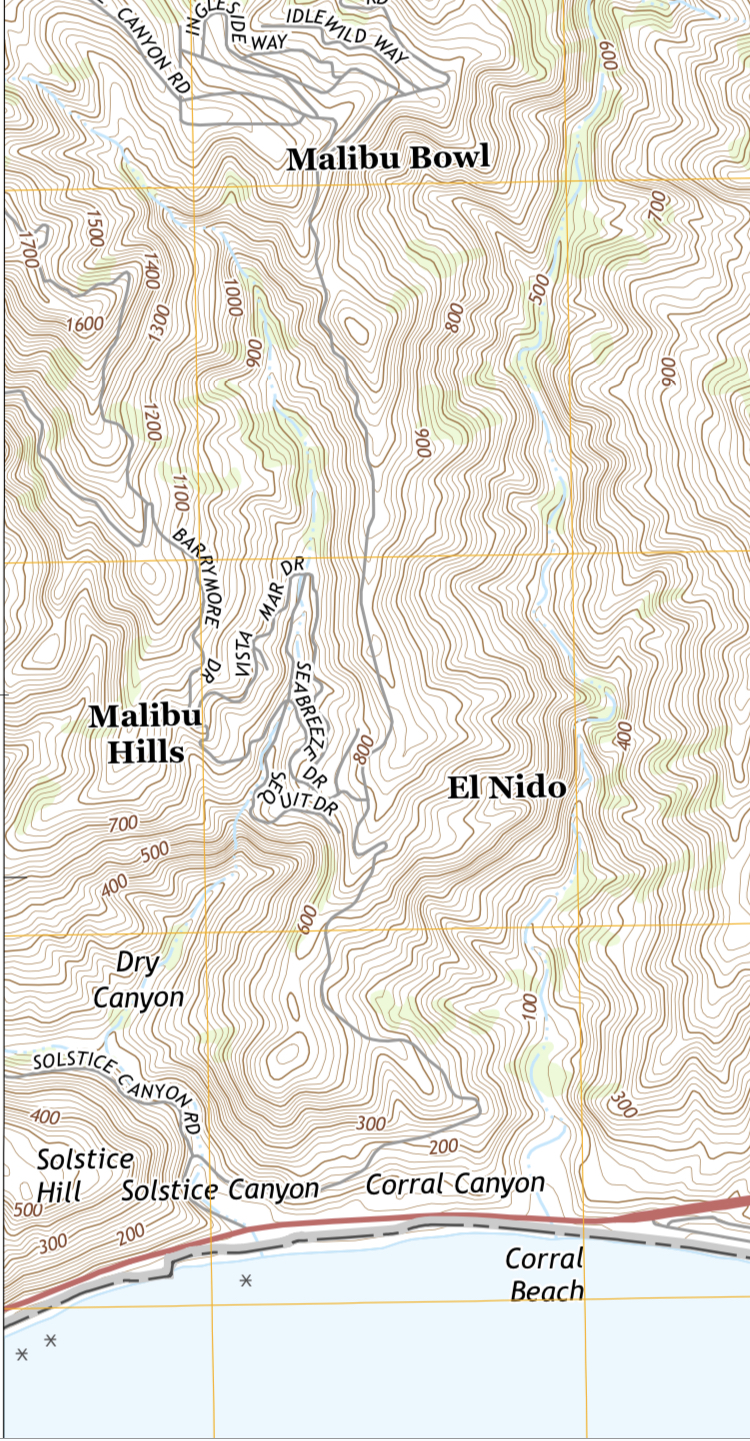
El Nido on 2015 Malibu Beach Quadrangle map produced by USGS

El Nido (Spanish for "The Nest") is a residential neighborhood in Corral Canyon in unincorporated Los Angeles County, California, United States. The community, originally developed in the 1920s, is in the Santa Monica Mountains along the northern border of Malibu. There are two developments in Corral Canyon, El Nido is the lower of the two. The other was known as Newell in 1958 and has more recently been known as Malibu Bowl. The El Nido houses look down on Solstice Canyon, the so-called "Mystery Silo" (used by TRW and Jet Propulsion Laboratory scientists in the mid-20th-century for testing of satellite equipment away from sources of electromagnetic interference), and a long-disused tract owned by the Los Angeles Department of Water and Power that is prone to landslides. There are 5.2 homes per acre in El Nido.

The 2007 Corral Canyon fire destroyed 53 homes including a number in El Nido.

The Malibu El Nido is not to be confused with the Redondo Beach El Nido, along the former Hawthorne–El Nido Line of the Pacific Electric railway.
