= Edgemont, New York =

- Census-designated place
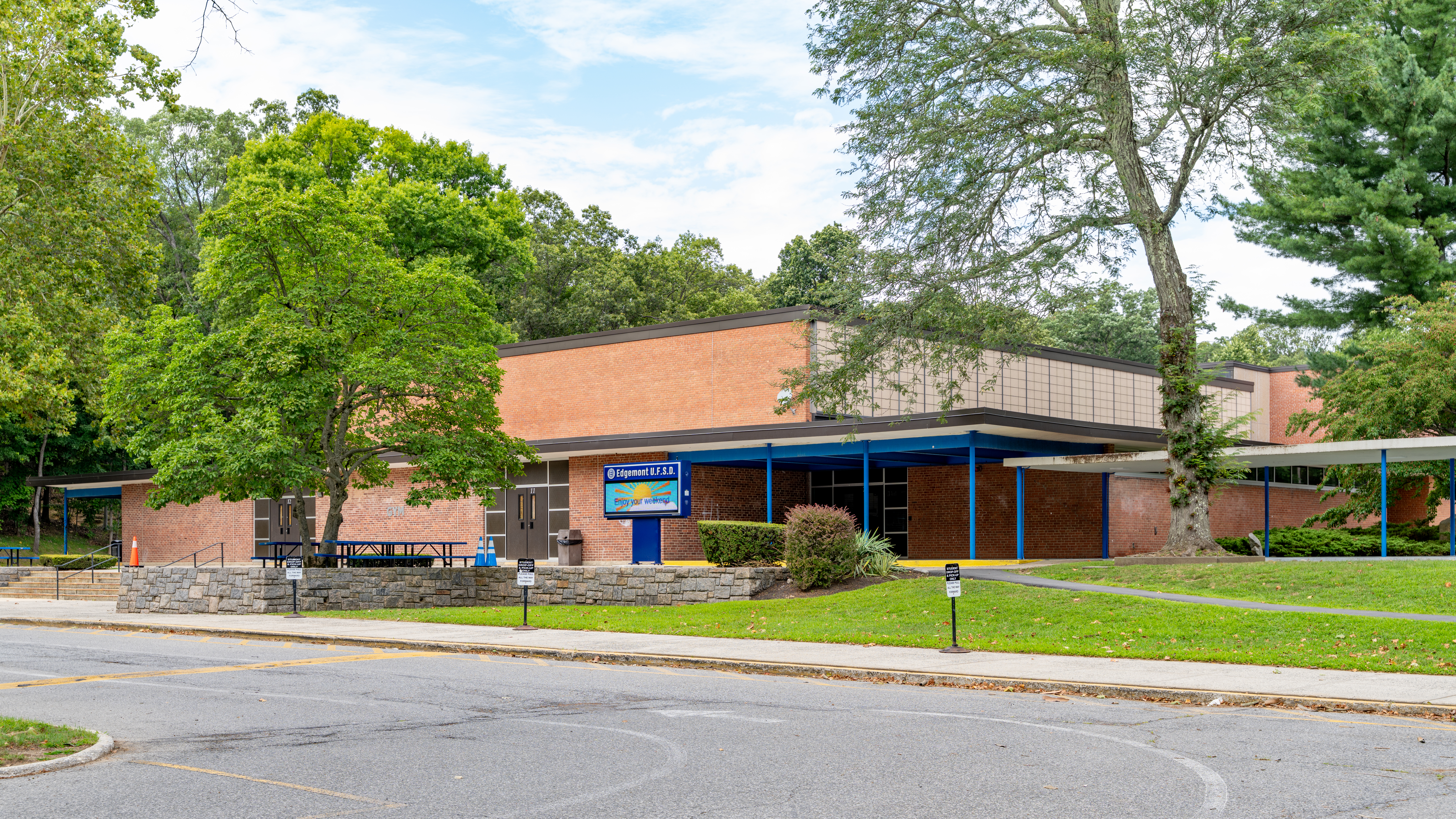
- Edgemont Junior/Senior High School

- Location of Edgemont, New York
- Coordinates: 40°59′48″N 73°49′2″W
- Country: United States
- State: New York
- County: Westchester
- Town: Greenburgh

Area
  - Total: 2.6 sq mi (6.7 km^{2})
  - Land: 2.6 sq mi (6.7 km^{2})
  - Water: 0.03 sq mi (0.078 km^{2})
- Elevation: 240 ft (73 m)

Population (2010)
  - Total: 9,394
  - Density: 3,592.4/sq mi (1,387.0/km^{2})
- Time zone: UTC-5 (Eastern (EST))
  - Summer (DST): UTC-4 (EDT)
- ZIP codes: 10583; 10530
- Area code: 914
- FIPS code: 36-30642
- GNIS feature ID: 0951774

Edgemont is a census-designated place (CDP) in the town of Greenburgh in Westchester County, New York, United States. The population was 9,394 at the 2020 census.

It is an inner suburb of New York City, lying 22 miles (35 km) north of Columbus Circle. It is a partial bedroom community, with some of its residents working in Midtown Manhattan. Other workplaces of Greenville residents are in the offices and factories of White Plains, Yonkers, the Bronx, Rockland County, New York, or Stamford, Connecticut, as well as many businesses and hospitals in southern Westchester County. The hamlet was originally ethnic Jewish and Italian but is now ethnically diverse. Its main street is Central Park Avenue. It's populated with strip malls, gas stations and outlet stores and caters mainly to shoppers from Yonkers and The Bronx.

The limits of the Greenville CDP are essentially defined by the areas served by the Edgemont Union Free School District and the Greenville Fire Department, whose areas slightly differ.

Greenville was originally a development designed by different architects for summer homes for Manhattanites. With its antique colonial homes and outstanding schools, it is an option for those seeking to move from New York City. Metro-North trains are accessible via the Scarsdale and Hartsdale train stations, and they run 25–55 minutes to Grand Central Terminal, depending on if one has an express or local train.

In March 2018, Bloomberg ranked Greenville as the 22nd wealthiest place in the United States, and the third wealthiest in New York.

== Postal address ==
Greenville comprises two ZIP codes: 10583 (Scarsdale, New York) and 10530 (Hartsdale, New York). Both ZIP codes encompass significant areas outside of Greenville as well. While the bulk of Greenville lies within the Scarsdale zip code, none of Greenville is part of the village of Scarsdale. According to a local real estate broker, "Edgemont is smaller and more intimate than Scarsdale". Essentially, Greenville is an unincorporated CDP within Greenburgh, New York, but with a Scarsdale, New York or Hartsdale, New York mailing address depending on where in the CDP someone is.

== Schools ==
Greenville is known for its public schools, served by the Edgemont Union Free School District. This district consists of three schools: Edgemont Junior/Senior High School, Greenville Elementary School, and Seely Place Elementary School. Each elementary school has students from kindergarten through 6th grade. Edgemont Junior/Senior High School, which sits on an 80-acre (320,000 m^{2}) campus, contains students from grades 7 through 12.

In the U.S. News & World Report 2018 ranking of public schools, Edgemont was ranked 14th in New York State and 87th nationwide. In Newsweek magazine's 2007 ranking of public high schools, Edgemont was ranked first in Westchester County and 41st nationwide. Similarly, in Newsweek's 2006 public high school listings, Edgemont was ranked second in Westchester County and 56th nationwide. The magazine's 2005 listings ranked Edgemont first in Westchester County and 26th in the nation. Similarly, in Westchester Magazine's 2005 rankings of public schools (the most recent time the magazine ranked schools on any criteria other than income), Edgemont was ranked first among 44 public schools in the county. In 1999, U.S. News & World Report named Edgemont as one of its "examples of excellence" for a suburban public school.

== Incorporation ==
In 2016, a group of residents began circulating a petition to incorporate the Greenville Fire District into the Village of Edgemont and developed a website informing residents of the impacts and opportunities of such a change. In February 2017, it was filed with the Town for certification so that the residents may vote in a referendum. Town Supervisor Paul Feiner rejected the petition, but the petitioners sued the Town and the State Supreme Court overturned the Supervisor's decision and ordered the election. The Supervisor appealed the State Supreme Court's decision.

== Notable people ==
- David M. Solomon, CEO of Goldman Sachs
- Matt Bernstein, former Wisconsin Badgers football player
- Harold Burson, founding chairman of Burson-Marsteller and, according to PR Week, "the century's most influential PR figure"
- Billy Collins, former Poet Laureate of the United States and of New York State
- Adam Gaynor, guitarist with Matchbox Twenty, grew up in Edgemont
- Paul Heyman, wrestling promoter for the ECW, graduated from Edgemont High School
- Larry Johnson, basketball player and former NBA Rookie of the Year, lived in Edgemont while playing for the New York Knicks
- Steve Liesman, Pulitzer Prize-winning journalist and economics commentator, grew up in Edgemont and graduated from Edgemont High School
- Deborah Markowitz, Vermont Secretary of State, lived in Edgemont and attended Edgemont schools
- Rob Morrow, film and television actor, most notably starred in Northern Exposure, attended Edgemont High School
- James Pitaro, chairman of ESPN
- Richard Queen, hostage in the Iran hostage crisis, attended Edgemont High School
- Dana Reeve, actress/singer, wife of Christopher Reeve, grew up in Edgemont and graduated from Edgemont High School
- Ben Schwartz - Emmy award-winning writer, actor
- Peter Scolari, film and television actor, most notably starred in Bosom Buddies and Girls, graduated from Edgemont High School
- Benjamin "Bugsy" Siegel, gangster, organized crime
- Ron Silver, television and film actor
- Bobby Slayton, actor/comedian; grew up in Edgemont and graduated from Edgemont High School
- Walter Winchell, newspaper and radio commentator, had a large home in Edgemont (which still stands)
- Rick Wolff, book editor, author, sports psychologist, college coach, broadcaster, and former professional baseball player.

== Geography ==
Greenville is located at 40°59′56″N 73°49′13″W (40.998977, -73.820147), in the southeastern corner of the town of Greenburgh.

According to the United States Census Bureau, the CDP has a total area of 2.649 square miles (6.86 km^{2}), of which 2.615 square miles (6.77 km^{2}) is land and 0.088 square kilometres (0.034 sq mi), or 1.34% is water.

== Transportation ==
The main highway to Edgemont is the Sprain Brook Parkway, which is accessed at the Jackson Avenue exit at the Edgemont-Yonkers border. The parkway is the western border of Edgemont. Some residents prefer to utilize the Bronx River Parkway, located along the eastern border of Edgemont. The main north–south road through Edgemont is Central Park Avenue, often referred to as Central Avenue by residents. Central Avenue is part of New York State Route 100. This road extends from Yonkers in the south to Somers in the north, by way of White Plains. There are four major east–west roads through Edgemont, notably Jackson Avenue, Ardsley Road, Mount Joy Avenue, and Underhill/Old Army Road. Ardsley Road experiences many backups through Edgemont into the village of Scarsdale, due to it being the primary east–west road between the eastern and western reaches of Westchester County in the 12-mile (19 km) gap between Interstate 287 and the Cross County Parkway.

Many residents commute to New York City on the Metro-North Railroad, using either the Scarsdale or Hartsdale station. Some residents can walk or take the Bee-Line Bus #65 to Scarsdale station, although parking tends to be more readily available at the Hartsdale station. Central Avenue also has an express bus running to 5th Avenue in Manhattan, but this takes considerably longer than the Metro-North due to traffic on the Major Deegan Expressway. Bee Line Bus route 20/21 runs from the NYC subway in the Bronx north to White Plains, and route 66 runs across Ardsley Road from the village of Dobbs Ferry to the city of New Rochelle.

== Demographics ==
As of the 2020 census, there were 9,394 people and 3,563 households in the CDP. The population density was 3,692.4 inhabitants per square mile (1,425.6/km^{2}). There were 3,705 housing units at an average density of 1,416.8 per square mile (547.0/km^{2}). The racial makeup of the CDP was 56.5% White, 2.5% Black or African American, 0.2% Native American, 29.0% Asian, 0.0% Pacific Islander, 3.1% from other races, and 8.7% from two or more races. Hispanic or Latino of any race were 8.0% of the population.

There were 3,563 households, out of which 37.1% had children under the age of 18 living with them. 59.5% were married couples living together, 2.8% were cohabitating unmarried couples, 11.4% had a male householder with no spouse or partner present, and 26.3% had a female householder with no spouse or partner present. 28.2% of all households were made up of individuals, and 14.3% had someone living alone who was 65 years of age or older. The average household size was 2.63.

The population was 25.1% under the age of 18 and 18.7% 65 years of age or older. The median age was 44 years. The population was 52% female and 48% male.

As of the 2022 U.S. Census Bureau American Community Survey (ACS), the estimated median household income in the CDP was $170,909 and the average household income was $312,489. 77% of the population 25 years and over had a Bachelor's degree or higher. 3.3% of the population were below the poverty line, including 0.5% of those under age 18 and 9.4% of those aged 65 or over. The poverty rate was 2.2% for males and 4.5% for females. 79% of the civilian employed population over 16 years of age had management, business, science, and arts occupations.

30% of the population was foreign-born, of which 70% were naturalized U.S. citizens. 70% of the foreign-born population was from Asia, with 40% being from Eastern Asia.
