= Edgemont Junior – Senior High School =

Public school in Greenville, New York, US

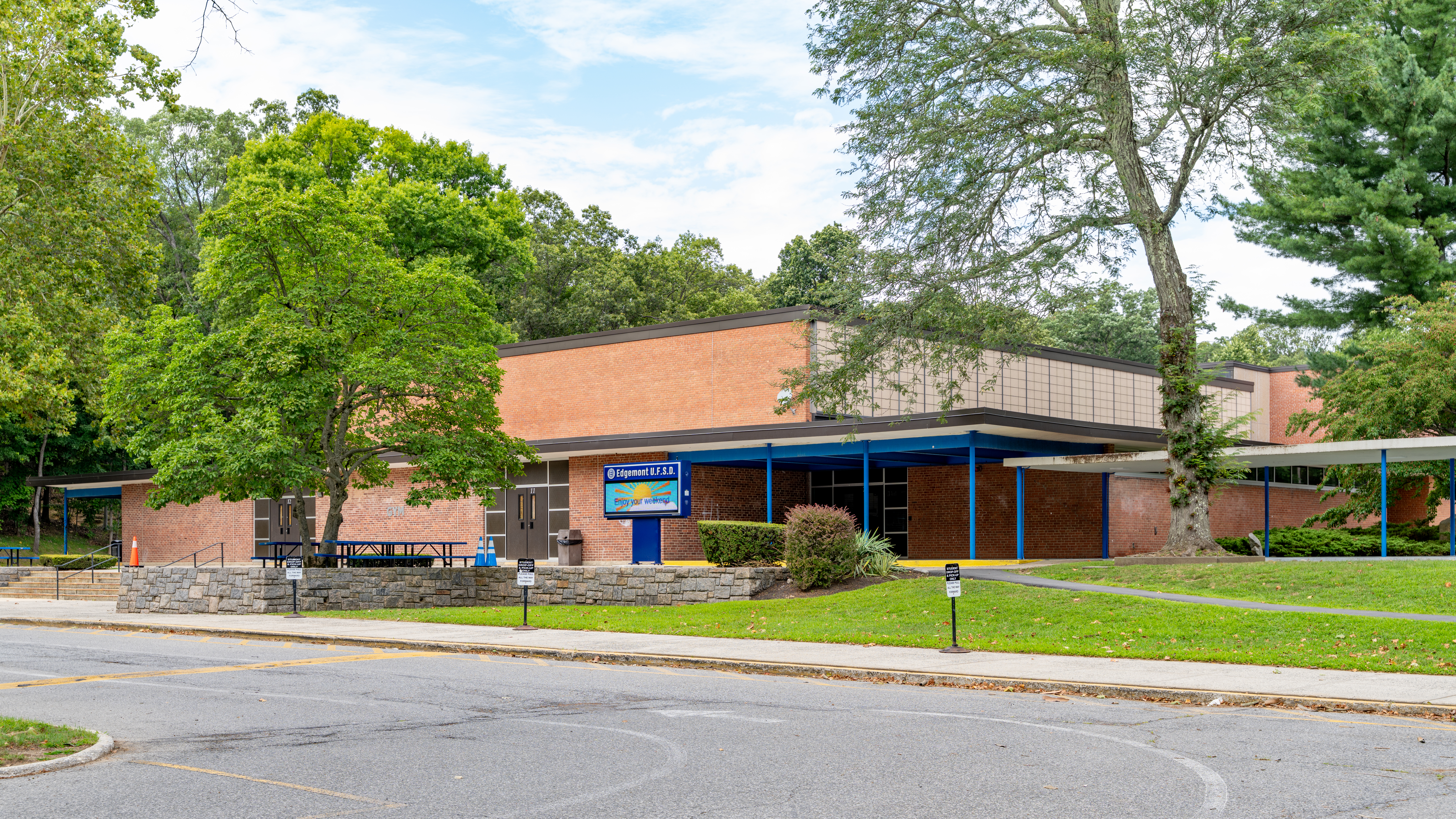

Location
- 200 White Oak Lane; Scarsdale, New York 10583; United States; 41°00′03″N 73°48′29″W

Information
- Type: Public secondary
- Established: 1955; 71 years ago
- School district: Edgemont
- Principal: Kyle Hosier
- Teaching staff: 73.82 (FTE) (2017–18)
- Grades: 7 – 12
- Gender: Co-ed
- Enrollment: 949 (2017–18)
- Student to teacher ratio: 12.86 (2017–18)
- Campus: Suburban
- Colors: Royal Blue; White
- Mascot: Panther
- Rival: Scarsdale Raiders
- Newspaper: Campus Magazine
- Yearbook: Respectus
- Website: ehs.edgemont.org

Edgemont Junior – Senior High School is a high school in Greenville, New York, serving students in grades 7 -12. Its feeder schools are Greenville School and Seely Place School, where students graduate in the sixth grade. The school's colors are blue and white, and its mascot is a panther. Edgemont Junior – Senior High School has a "California-style campus" which is similar to a small college campus. The school has 5 academic buildings, with one building dedicated mainly to the 7th and 8th graders. Greenville/Edgemont is an unincorporated part of Greenburgh, New York.

== Rankings in the mass media ==
Niche Magazine selected the Edgemont School District as the #1 Public School District in America in 2015. Edgemont frequently fares well in national high school rankings, as well. In 2006, Newsweek named Edgemont the 61st best high school in the country. In 2007, the magazine ranked Edgemont higher, at 41st place. In 2005, The Washington Post named the school 26th, and in its 2008, U.S. News & World Report ranked Edgemont High School 28th. In 2012, U.S. News & World Report ranked Edgemont 19th best public high school in New York state and 96th best in the US.

More recently in 2013, Newsweek ranked Edgemont as the 18th best high school in the Northeast, and 72nd overall in the nation. It also reported that 99% of the student body graduate in four years. Of that 99%, 100% of those students are college-bound upon graduation.

== Special programs and extracurriculars ==
Edgemont offers a rigorous academic curriculum that includes 13 Advanced Placement courses and 17 Honors courses in subjects including math, art, history, science, economics and foreign languages.

The school also runs a highly successful music and theater program. Edgemont's yearly spring musical participates in the High School Theater Awards presented by The Helen Hayes Youth Theatre, and often wins awards in many categories. Musically inclined students may choose from playing in the regular orchestra, the sports pep band, the chorus, the Chamber Choir, and the wind ensemble, among other programs. Edgemont's debate and Model UN teams are highly regarded, and frequently do well in tournaments and conferences. The Model UN team received the best delegation award at the National High School Model UN Conference in 2024, making it one of the top delegations in the world. There are numerous student-run clubs ranging in many different areas, including a monthly school magazine, literary magazines, and community service groups.

Its school newspaper publication, the Edgemont Campus, was revamped this school year. The magazine now prints 24 pages in color and includes more in-depth pieces.

The school offers special education programs.

It also provides a democratically run, student-centric Alternative School, known as Phædrus founded in 1977.

== Athletics ==
The school fields over 60 different interscholastic sports teams, including soccer, cross-country, tennis, golf, bowling, field hockey, volleyball, skiing, football, wrestling, lacrosse, basketball, golf, winter and spring track, baseball, swimming, and softball.

Edgemont is known for its successful wrestling program, which, since 2003, has produced nine League Championship teams, three New York State Champions, nine Section 1 Wrestler of the Year Honorees, 15 All-State Wrestlers, 31 Individual Section Champion, 73 All-Section Wrestlers, five Con Edison Scholar-Athlete Award winners and many dozens of All-League athletes. In 2022, Edgemont Wrestling won both the Section 1 Dual Meet Championship and the Section 1 Team Championship. In 2024, Edgemont Wrestling won yet another Section 1 Championship.

Edgemont's Football team won three consecutive state championships in 1998, 1999, and 2000. Their Football program has also won five section championships, one in 1995 and four consecutive in 1998, 1999, 2000, and 2001.

== Notable alumni ==
- Matt Bernstein, former football player inducted into the National Jewish Sports Hall of Fame
- Ankur Bulsara of the band Seneca Hawk
- (Derek Gruen) Del Marquis, lead guitarist Scissor Sisters
- Paul Heyman, entertainment producer, writer, performer, marketer, promoter, advocate and commentator
- Michael Jamin, screenwriter King of the Hill, Maron, producer
- Robert C. Kolodny, author and specialist in human sexuality and related topics
- Bruce Lefkowitz, basketball player
- Steve Liesman (born 1963), journalist, senior economics reporter for the cable financial television channel CNBC
- Greg Lippmann, hedge fund manager, co-founder of Libremax
- Rob Morrow, actor (dropped out senior year)
- James Pitaro, class of 1987, President of ESPN and co-chair of Disney Media Networks
- Richard Posner, federal judge and law professor
- Richard Queen, hostage during Iran Hostage Crisis
- Dana Reeve, wife of actor Christopher Reeve
- Ben Schwartz, Emmy Award-winning writer, actor, comedian, and author
- Peter Scolari, actor
- David M Solomon, class of 1980, investment banker, CEO of Goldman Sachs (as of Oct 1, 2018).
- Lauren Spierer, class of 2009, disappeared near the campus of Indiana University
