= Edgemont Historic District =

National historic district at Rocky Mount, Edgecombe County, North Carolina

- U.S. National Register of Historic Places
- U.S. Historic district
- Location within North Carolina Location within the United States
- Location: 500-800 blocks of Tarboro St., the 600-800 blocks of Hill St., and the southern side of the 600-800 blocks of Sycamore St.; also roughly bounded by Cokey Rd., George St., Eastern Ave., Edgewood St., and School St., Rocky Mount, North Carolina
- Coordinates: 35°56′10″N 77°47′19″W
- Area: 55.5 acres (22.5 ha)
- Architectural style: Bungalow/craftsman, Classical Revival, Colonial Revival
- NRHP reference No.: 99001365, 02000989 (Boundary Increase)
- Added to NRHP: November 12, 1999, September 14, 2002 (Boundary Increase)

Edgemont Historic District is a national historic district located at Rocky Mount, Edgecombe County, North Carolina. The district encompasses 293 contributing buildings in a predominantly residential section of Rocky Mount. They were mostly built between about 1915 and 1950, and include notable examples of Classical Revival, Colonial Revival, and Bungalow / American Craftsman architecture. Notable buildings include the Trinity Lutheran Church (1937) and the former Edgemont School (1914).

It was listed on the National Register of Historic Places in 1999, with a boundary increase in 2002.
