= Disappearance of Lauren Spierer =

American woman who went missing in 2011

Lauren E. Spierer
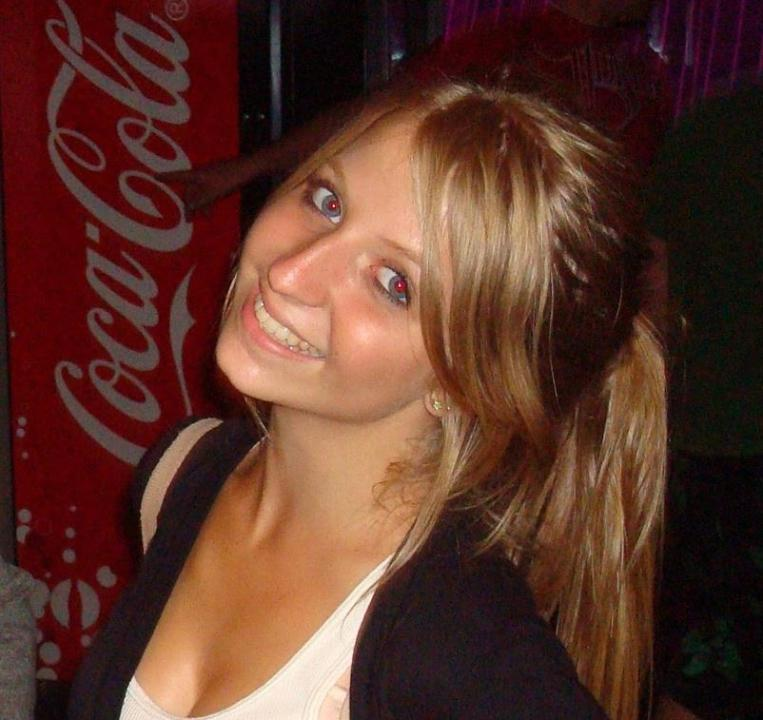
- Born: January 17, 1991; Scarsdale, New York, U.S.
- Disappeared: June 3, 2011 (aged 20); Bloomington, Indiana, U.S.
- Status: Missing for 15 years, 5 months and 19 days

Lauren Elizabeth Spierer (born January 17, 1991) is an American woman who disappeared on June 3, 2011, following an evening at Kilroy's Sports Bar in Bloomington, Indiana. At the time, Spierer was a 20-year-old student at Indiana University. Though her disappearance generated national press coverage, Spierer is presumed dead and her case remains unsolved.

== Background ==
Lauren Elizabeth Spierer was born January 17, 1991, to Charlene and Robert Spierer; her father was an accountant. She grew up in Scarsdale, New York, an affluent town in lower Westchester County. Spierer graduated from Edgemont High School in 2009 and enrolled at Indiana University (IU), where she was studying textiles merchandising. Spierer was active in the Jewish community at IU and had spent the previous spring break planting trees in Israel on behalf of the Jewish National Fund.

Spierer met her boyfriend, Jesse Wolff, and her friend, Jay Rosenbaum, years earlier at Camp Towanda, a summer camp in the mountain town of Honesdale, Pennsylvania. It was there she also met various other future IU students who later became Spierer's circle of friends when she enrolled at IU in 2009.

== Disappearance ==
On the night she disappeared, Spierer was drinking with several friends. Wolff stated that he did not go out with Spierer or her friends that evening, texting back and forth with Spierer before he went to bed. According to witnesses, Spierer was very intoxicated. Bloomington police used video surveillance footage and witness statements to create a timeline of Spierer's whereabouts before her disappearance.

== Timeline ==
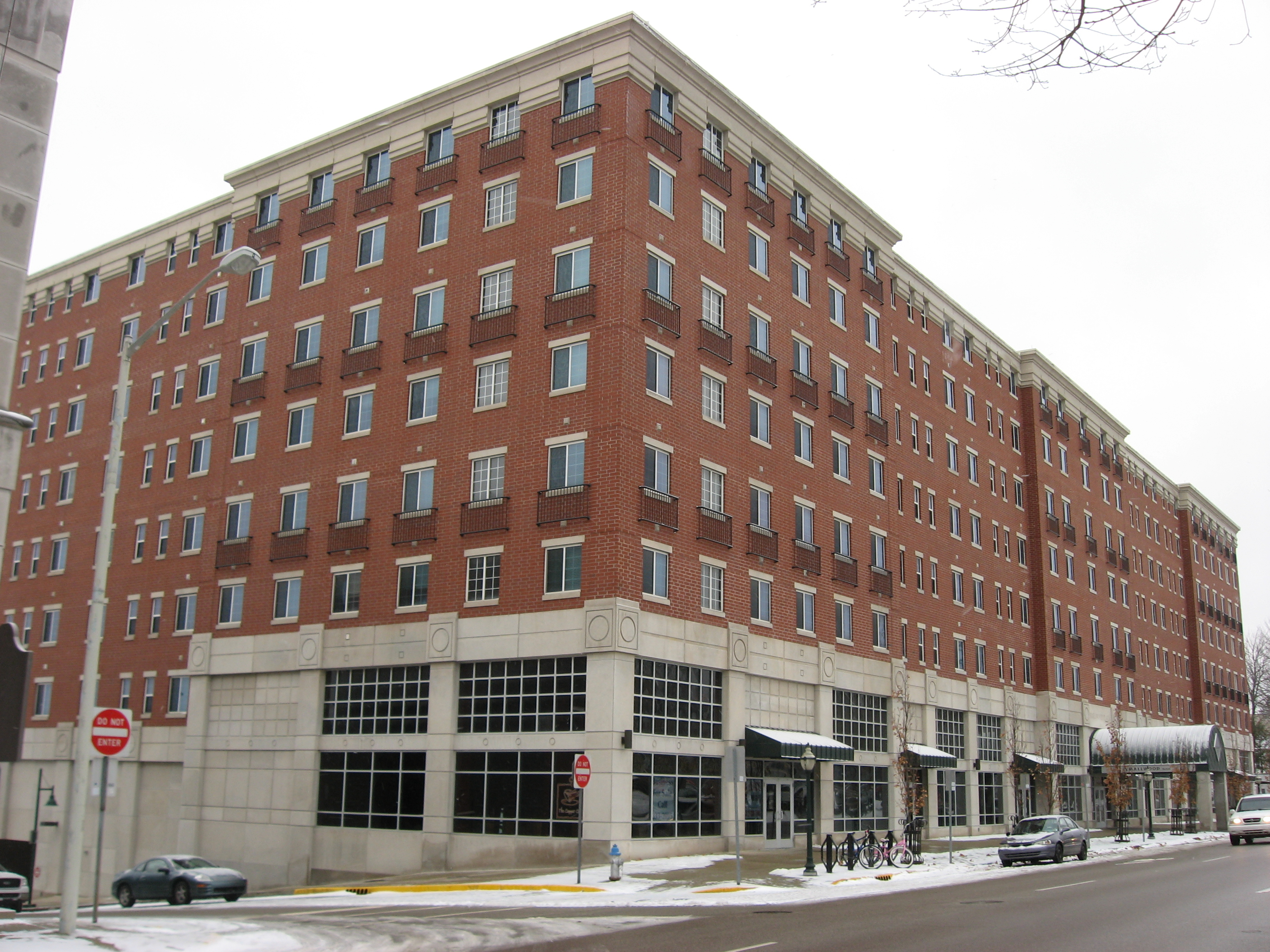
Smallwood Plaza, College Avenue North 415

The timestamps in bold indicate surveillance footage. The other times mentioned are on the basis of witness statements.

Locations in the search for Lauren Spierer
1 02:27 Kilroys
2 02:48 Smallwood Plaza.
3 04:30 Intersection of 11th and College

Friday, June 3, 2011

- 12:30 a.m. – Witnesses report that Spierer left her apartment with a friend named David Rohn. The pair went to Jay Rosenbaum's apartment, and she met up with Corey Rossman, Rosenbaum's neighbor.
- **1:46 a.m.** – Spierer is seen entering Kilroy's Sports Bar.
- **2:27 a.m.** – Spierer is seen exiting the bar with Rossman. Spierer left her cell phone and shoes at the bar. She had taken off her shoes when she walked out onto the sand-covered patio. Rossman walked with Spierer to her apartment complex.
- **2:30 a.m.** – Spierer is seen entering Smallwood Plaza apartments, where her residence is located. A passerby named Zach Oakes noticed her level of inebriation and asked if she was okay.
- **2:48 a.m.** – After she left the apartments, Spierer entered an alley that runs between College Avenue and Morton Street. Security cameras mounted on nearby apartments show her exit the alley at **2:51 a.m.** and walk toward an empty lot. Spierer's keys and purse were found along this route through the alley. Spierer and Rossman arrived at Rossman's apartment shortly afterward. Michael Beth, Rossman's roommate, was at the apartment. Rossman himself was very intoxicated and stumbling. He vomited on the carpet on the way upstairs. Beth stated that he escorted Rossman to bed. He then tried to persuade Spierer to sleep over for her own safety. He claimed Spierer said she wanted to return to her own apartment.
- 3:30 a.m. – Beth said he then phoned his neighbor, Rosenbaum, wanting him to take care of Spierer. Beth said that Spierer was attempting to get Beth to drink with her at her own apartment. She eventually went to Rosenbaum's apartment, where he observed a bruise under her eye, presumably sustained in a fall earlier that evening. She told him she didn't know how she got the bruise. Two calls were placed from Rosenbaum's phone shortly before she is reported to have left. Rosenbaum said Spierer placed both calls, one to Rohn and one to another friend. Neither picked up, and no messages were left.
- 4:30 a.m. – Rosenbaum reports that Spierer left the apartment. This is the last reported sighting of her. He reported last seeing Spierer at the intersection of 11th Street and College Avenue, headed south on College. She was last seen barefoot, wearing black leggings and a white shirt.
- Several hours later that morning, Wolff sent Spierer a text. He received a reply from an employee at the bar. Wolff reported Spierer missing.

== Investigation ==
In August 2011, police conducted a nine-day search of the Sycamore Ridge Landfill in Pimento (south of Terre Haute) for clues in the disappearance. The landfill is where trash from Bloomington is hauled after a stop at a transfer station. The Bloomington Police Department, the Indiana University Police Department, and the FBI took part in the search. As of May 24, 2013, investigators had received 3,060 tips on Spierer's disappearance, 100 of them received during the first half of 2013.

In April 2015, the Bloomington Police announced that they were investigating a possible link between Spierer's disappearance and the murder of another IU student, Hannah Wilson. Wilson went missing on April 24, 2015, after visiting Kilroy's, the same bar that Spierer visited the night she disappeared. Wilson was last seen getting into a taxi in front of the bar and driving away. Her body was found the next morning in Brown County. A local man named Daniel Messel was arrested for the murder after his cell phone was discovered near the body. In July 2015, it was concluded that the two cases are unrelated and any similarities between the two cases were coincidental.

On January 28, 2016, the FBI and other police agencies investigated a property in the 2900 block of Old Morgantown Road in Martinsville, approximately 20 miles (32 km) north of Bloomington. According to a statement released by the FBI, investigators were "following up on leads and tips in Morgan County regarding the disappearance of Lauren Spierer". The property was connected to a man, Justin Wagers, who resided there with his mother and stepfather. Wagers was suspected of exposing himself to numerous local women.

Investigators searched the property with cadaver dogs, which indicated potential evidence. Anthropologists conducted a dig and sifted dirt from the barn where the cadaver dogs hit, but found nothing. Investigators also towed from the property a white truck belonging to Wagers.

== Theories ==
A number of theories have emerged in reference to what happened to Spierer that evening. Spierer's parents have stated that they believe their daughter is dead. Based on her level of intoxication, they also felt that she may have been drugged while at the bar. "We felt somebody could have slipped something into her drink at Kilroy's," said Robert Spierer. The family has voiced suspicions about the men she was with that evening, as well as Wolff, since they refused to take police-issued polygraphs and retained lawyers soon after Spierer's disappearance. While the parents have not made any specific accusations, they do believe the two know more than they have told police so far. The men responded that they have taken privately administered polygraphs, as well as one from the FBI. Since they do not trust the Bloomington police, they say, they have retained lawyers.

=== Accidental overdose ===
Regarding Spierer's level of intoxication, her friends and Wolff told police that she used drugs in addition to alcohol on the night leading up to her disappearance. Wolff's mother alleged that Spierer was asked to leave the summer camp where she met her son and Rosenbaum years earlier because of drug use. "This poor little girl is not with us today because of her drug abuse," she said. On September 2, 2010, nine months before her disappearance, Spierer was arrested on charges of public intoxication and illegal consumption. After her disappearance, police found a "small amount of cocaine" in her room.

Rosenbaum told investigators that Spierer consumed alcohol, snorted cocaine, and crushed up Klonopin tablets that evening. Her rare heart condition—long QT syndrome—added to the danger of drug use. Police addressed rumors that implied Spierer may have overdosed and those with her may have hidden her body to avoid criminal charges. Bo Dietl, a private investigator hired by the Spierer family, doubts that a fatal drug overdose could be enough motive to hide her death; he cited the prevalence of drug abuse on the IU campus. "Every kid's buying pot, cocaine, drinking, pills," he said. "I mean, it's all over the place. So that really can't be the motive behind it."

=== Stranger abduction ===
The police have also acknowledged they have not ruled out other possibilities, such as abduction by a stranger. Spierer's parents have previously stated that they do not believe her disappearance was a random abduction.

=== Daniel Messel ===
In 2017, Brown County prosecutor Ted Adams reported he believed Daniel Messel could be connected to Spierer's disappearance. In 2016, Messel was convicted of killing another IU student, Hannah Wilson, in 2015. Wilson had only been reported missing for one day when her body was found in a desolate field; she had been bludgeoned to death. Messel's cell phone was discovered at her feet. Messel has never been charged in connection with Spierer's case.

== Civil lawsuits ==
Spierer's parents filed civil lawsuits against Rossman, Rosenbaum, and Beth for their involvement with their daughter leading up to her disappearance. The suits accused the defendants of negligence, alleging they supplied Spierer with alcohol after she was already "visibly intoxicated", then neglected to assure she returned safely to her apartment, which likely led to her death. The family stated they hoped the lawsuit would lead to the defendants admitting more information about what occurred the night of Spierer's disappearance. "I truly don't think it was a random abduction, I think that somebody that Lauren knew was responsible for the events of that evening," Spierer's mother said. As part of the suit, they subpoenaed private cell phone and academic records spanning 134 days before and after the night Spierer disappeared, a move the defendants’ lawyers labeled a "fishing expedition".

In 2013, federal judge Tanya Walton Pratt dismissed the suit against Beth after determining he had no duty of care for Spierer.

In 2014, Pratt dismissed the suit against the other two men, finding: "...there could be any number of theories as to what happened to Lauren and what, if any, injuries she may have sustained. Without evidence to prove these theories, it would be impossible for a jury to determine if whatever happened to Spierer was a natural and probable consequence of her intoxication, without any other intervening acts that would break the causal chain." Spierer's parents appealed the ruling, but the dismissal was upheld by a federal appeals court in 2015. Lawyers for the men have stated that their clients have cooperated fully with police and the private investigators hired by the Spierer family, and that all of them have passed private polygraphs. "They've been interviewed and interviewed and interviewed, and to say they've been less than forthcoming is just not accurate," said an attorney who represents Beth and Rohn. To date, none of the defendants have been named as suspects in Spierer's disappearance.

== In the media ==
The HLN show, Real Life Nightmare, detailed the Lauren Spierer case in an hour-long episode called "Night of No Return" in 2019. Spierer's case has been covered in multiple podcasts, including: Crime Junkie, True Crime Garage, Going West: True Crime, True Crime All The Time Unsolved, Trace Evidence, Not Another True Crime Podcast, and I Wish You Were Here.

The intense press coverage of the disappearance has been dubbed an example of missing white woman syndrome, a phenomenon wherein the news media disproportionately covers missing-person cases that involve young, white, upper-middle class females. The Indiana Daily Student, IU's student paper, ran a story that documented the disparity between their own coverage of Spierer's disappearance and their coverage of another local disappearance, Crystal Grubb, 29, who was also white but came from a working-class family wherein many relatives had criminal histories. Following Grubb's disappearance in 2010, the Daily Student ran a total of seven stories on the case compared to multiple front-page articles and the extensive national awareness of the Spierer case.

== See also ==
- List of people who disappeared mysteriously (2000–present)
