= Edgemont Church =

Historic church in Virginia, United States

- U.S. National Register of Historic Places
- Virginia Landmarks Register
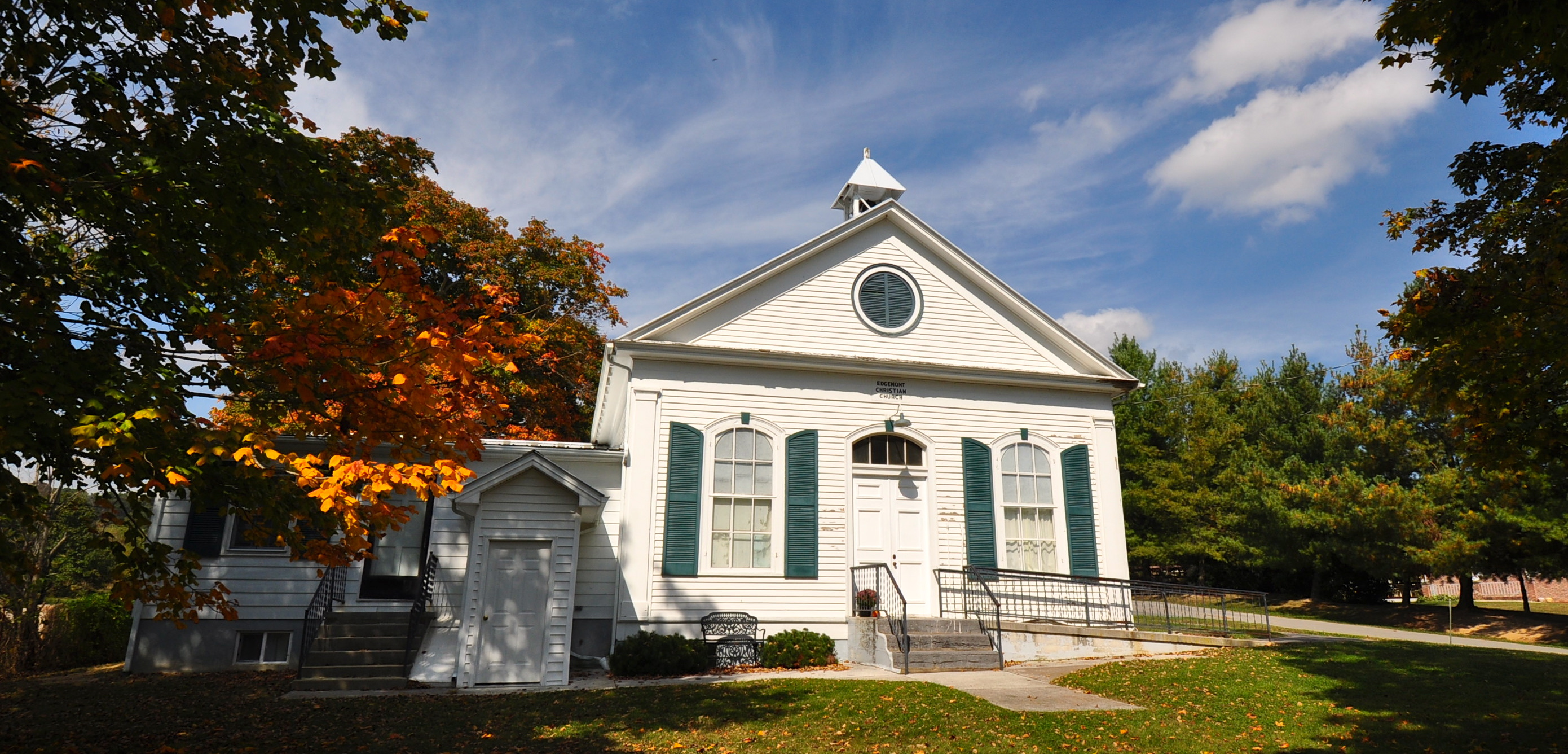
- Edgemont Church, October 2013

- Location within Virginia Location within the United States
- Location: VA 666, 1 mile (1.6 km) east of VA 645, near Christiansburg, Virginia
- Coordinates: 37°6′27″N 80°28′44″W
- Area: less than one acre
- Architectural style: Italianate, Nave plan
- MPS: Montgomery County MPS
- NRHP reference No.: 89001902
- VLR No.: 060-0139

Significant dates
- Added to NRHP: November 13, 1989
- Designated VLR: June 20, 1989

Edgemont Church is a historic Christian Church (Disciples of Christ) church building located near Christiansburg, Montgomery County, Virginia. It was built about 1860, and is a one-story, three bay by three bay, frame structure. It has a pedimented principal facade with a large circular louvered vent, paneled corner pilasters with molded capitals and segmentally arched openings. Also on the property is a contributing church cemetery.

It was listed on the National Register of Historic Places in 1989.
