= Enchanted Hills, California =

Unincorporated community in California, United States

Enchanted Hills
- unincorporated community
- Location in California Enchanted Hills (the United States)
- Coordinates: 38°22′59″N 122°25′34″W
- Country: United States
- State: California
- County: Napa
- Elevation: 1,073 ft (327 m)

Enchanted Hills is an unincorporated community in Napa County, California, United States. It lies at an elevation of 1073 feet (327 m). Enchanted Hills is located 5.25 miles (8.4 km) south of Rutherford.

Enchanted Hills is a campground and retreat center for children and adults with visual impairments. It was founded in 1950 by Rose Resnick. It is owned and operated by LightHouse for the Blind and Visually Impaired.
