= Elevational diversity gradient =

Ecological pattern in which biodiversity changes with elevation

Elevational diversity gradient (EDG) is an ecological pattern where biodiversity changes with elevation. The EDG states that species richness tends to decrease as elevation increases, up to a certain point, creating a "diversity bulge" at middle elevations. There have been multiple hypotheses proposed for explaining the EDG, none of which accurately describe the phenomenon in full.

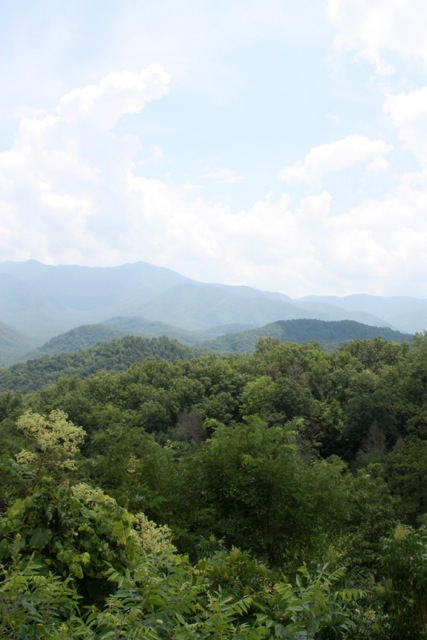
View of Mont LeConte in Great Smokey Mountains National Park, Tennessee

A similar pattern, known as the latitudinal diversity gradient, describes an increase in biodiversity from the poles to the equator. While the EDG generally follows the LDG (i.e., high elevations in tropical regions have greater biodiversity than high elevations in temperate regions), the LDG does not account for elevational changes.

== Origin ==
The first recorded observation of the elevational diversity gradient was by Carl Linnaeus in his treatise On the growth of the habitable Earth. In this document, Linnaeus based his predictions on flood geology, assuming most of the world was at one point inundated, leaving only the highest elevations available for terrestrial life. Since, by Linnaeus's hypothesis, all life was concentrated at high elevations, a higher species diversity would be observed there even as life re-populated lower elevations.

In 1799, Alexander von Humboldt and Aimé Bonpland described elevational changes along the Andean slopes, noting how climatic changes impacted plant and animal communities. These observations contributed to Leslie R. Holdridge's "life zone concept" (1947). Climatic variables shaping life zones include mean potential temperature, total annual precipitation, and the ratio of mean annual evapotranspiration to mean annual precipitation. These variables, most notably precipitation and temperature, vary along an elevational gradient, resulting in the distribution of different ecosystems.

Much of the current literature correlates elevational diversity to gradients in single climatic or biotic variables including "rainfall, temperature, productivity, competition, resource abundance, habitat complexity, or habitat diversity".

== Implications ==
=== Mid-domain effect ===
A pattern in species richness is also observed as one moves along an elevational gradient; generally, species richness is thought to decline with increasing elevation. Whether this decline is monotonic or if it assumes different shapes based on the taxa or region being studied is still a topic of debate. In a review of previous studies looking at elevational diversity gradients, Rahbek noted the importance of other factors contributing to the shape of a gradient, distinguishing elevational patterns from those described by the latitudinal diversity gradient.

For certain taxa and regions, there is a mid-elevational peak in species richness. This pattern has received empirical support for small mammals, spiders, ants and plants. Alternatively, microbes have been shown to exhibit not only monotonically decreasing diversity when moving from low to high elevations, but also increasing, hump-shaped, and U-shaped elevational patterns in diversity. One explanation for a mid-elevational peak includes mid-elevational condensation zones. Under the assumption that natural boundaries can limit species distributions in varying degrees (for example, a mountain can present absolute elevational limits), Colwell and Lees explained the mid-domain effect with geometric theory. In the context of a mountain, geometric boundary constraints will naturally result in the increasing overlap of species ranges nearing the midpoint of the mountain. Using vascular epiphytes in Costa Rica, Cardelus et al. (2008) noted that the elevational species richness pattern observed was substantially due to the mid-domain effect; there was a bulge in epiphyte species richness at 1000m (The cloud forest).

This elevational pattern, however, was less consistent for species with small ranges, suggesting that environmental factors may be more clearly accounted for when constraints on domain boundaries are loosened. In cases where geometric models fail to explain the location of the midpoint or the trend in species richness, other explanations need to be explored. An example of this can be seen with microbes, which have been shown to exhibit monotonically decreasing diversity when moving from low to high elevations.

=== Mountain-mass effect ===
The mountain-mass effect (also known as the Massenerhebung effect or mass-elevation effect) was proposed in 1904 by A. de Quarvain. This phenomenon recognizes the correlation between mountain mass and the occurrence of physiognomically similar vegetation types; similarity in vegetation type is observed at higher elevations on large mountain masses. Furthermore, under a climatically driven mountain–mass effect, there is a "positive linear trend observed in the elevation of highest diversity with mountain height". This trend is most evident on isolated mountain peaks.

== Hypotheses ==
=== Area hypothesis ===
Another hypothesis that is cited to explain the upper limit of the elevational diversity gradient is the area hypothesis, which states that larger areas can support more species. As elevation increases, total area decreases; thus, there are more species present at middle elevations than at high elevations.

However, this hypothesis does not account for differences between lowland areas and middle elevations, as lowlands tend to have more area than middle elevations and thus would be expected by this hypothesis to have higher species diversity, an assertion that runs counter to the EDG. Additionally, the area hypothesis does not take climatic conditions or resource availability into account.

=== Rainfall hypothesis ===
This hypothesis states that diversity increases with increasing rainfall, however the correlation between rainfall and plant diversity varies from region to region. The consistency of rainfall seems to correlate more with species richness than total annual rainfall. Species diversity appears to level off when annual rainfall reaches about 4,000mm, however, this could be due to sampling limitations. Rainfall and soil richness affect productivity trends which are also believed to affect diversity. A mid-elevation peak is usually seen in mean annual rainfall.

=== Resource diversity hypothesis ===
The resource diversity hypothesis states an increase in diversity can be seen when an increase in the diversity of available resources such as soil and food is present. In this hypothesis diversity increases in an area of higher resource diversity even when resource abundance is constant. However resource diversity, especially in food, could be a result of other influences, such as rainfall and productivity; as such, it may be inappropriate to consider the resource diversity hypothesis as a mechanism acting independently of other factors influencing diversity gradients.

=== Productivity hypothesis ===
The productivity hypothesis states that diversity increases with increased productivity. There is some contradiction to this as other research suggests that after a certain point increasing productivity correlates with a decrease in diversity.

It is generally thought that productivity decreases with an increase in elevation, however, some research shows a peak in productivity at mid-elevation which may be related to a peak in rainfall within the same area.

=== Temperature hypothesis ===
The temperature hypothesis correlates increasing temperature with an increase in species diversity, mainly because of temperature's effect on productivity. However increasing temperatures due to climate change have begun to be linked to the spread of chytrid among frogs in the Tropics. Another concern is that higher-elevation species will become extinct as their ranges become more and more restricted with an increase in temperature. This hypothesis is an important factor in considering the effects of global warming.

=== Competition ===
There are conflicting views on the effect of competition on species diversity. Some hold the view that an increase in interspecies competition leads to local extinction and a decrease in diversity. Others view competition as a means of species specialization and niche partitioning, resulting in increased diversity.

In other studies, the competition between plant species at high elevations has been shown to facilitate the movement of plant species into high-stress environments. The competition between plant species leads to hardier species spreading into the high-stress environment. These founder species then provide shelter and facilitate the movement of less hardy species into the area. This may result in the movement of plant species up a mountainside.

== State of research ==
Current research illuminates a variety of mechanisms that can be used to explain elevational diversity gradients. No one factor can be used to explain the presence of diversity gradients within and among taxa; in many cases, we must consider more than one hypothesis or mechanism to fully understand a pattern in elevational diversity. The emerging macroecological experiments along environmental gradients (for example, mountain elevation gradients) are an important tool in ecological research because they allow for the disentangling the effects of individual environmental drivers on biodiversity, the independent effects of which are not easily separated due to their covariance in nature. For instance, microcosm experimental setups in subtropical and subarctic regions (China and Norway, respectively) showed clear segregation of bacterial species along temperature gradients, and interactive effects of temperature and nutrients on biodiversity along mountain elevation gradients. A more expansive research program for mountain biogeography may be extremely beneficial for conservation biologists seeking to understand factors driving biodiversity in known hot spots. Further research and reviews are also needed to address contradictions in the scientific literature and to identify the extent of interactions between current explanations and hypotheses.
