= Céline Spierer =

Swiss writer

Céline Spierer is a Swiss writer. Born in Geneva, she studied film at New York University, getting a bachelor's degree in screenwriting. She has worked as a consultant and assistant in various productions in the US and Switzerland. She lives in Manhattan. Le Fil rompu, her first novel, was published in 2020.
