= Hawthorne–El Nido Line =

Pacific Electric Railway line

Hawthorne–El Nido

Overview
- Termini: Hawthorne; El Nido

Service
- System: Pacific Electric
- Operator(s): Pacific Electric

History
- Opened: 1902
- Closed: October 25, 1933

Technical
- Line length: 3.66 mi (5.89 km)
- Track gauge: 1,435 mm (4 ft 8 1/2 in) standard gauge
- Old gauge: 3 ft 6 in (1,067 mm)
- Electrification: Overhead line, 600 V DC

Hawthorne–El Nido was a line of the Pacific Electric Railway. It initially hosted local services between Hawthorne and El Nido, though services were eventually routed through to Downtown Los Angeles and as far south as Clifton and Redondo Beach.

== History ==
The route was constructed by Los Angeles and Redondo Railway in 1902. Service was operating between Los Angeles and Redondo Beach by September 22. That line was split up after the Great Merger of 1911, with the segment between Hawthorne and El Nido going to the Pacific Electric and the tracks north of Hawthorne becoming the Los Angeles Railway E Line. The PE segment was converted to standard gauge the following year. Between 1914 and 1916, some trips were through-routed to El Segundo on the north end. As that ended, the line began to see service through to the Pacific Electric Building via Watts and Delta interspersed with a complicated schedule of other routings. At that time, select trips made the full run from Los Angeles to Clifton over the Hawthorne–El Nido segment with most trips being short turns at South Los Angeles. By 1931, all trips were running the length from Los Angeles to Redondo or El Nido. Service ceased after October 25, 1933, and more service was directed to the Redondo Beach via Gardena Line to serve Delta-area passengers.
