= East Gridley, California =

Unincorporated community in California, United States

East Gridley
- Unincorporated community
- Location in California
- Coordinates: 39°21′48″N 121°39′43″W
- Country: United States
- State: California
- County: Butte
- Elevation: 98 ft (30 m)

East Gridley (formerly Gridley Station) is an unincorporated community in Butte County, California, United States. It lies at an elevation of 98 feet (30 m). The town was founded as Gridley Station on the Sacramento Northern Railroad.
