= East Blythe, California =

- Former Census-designated place (CDP)
- Location in Riverside County and the state of California
- Coordinates: 33°36′38″N 114°34′26″W
- Country: United States
- State: California
- County: Riverside

Area
  - Total: 0.50 sq mi (1.3 km^{2})
  - Land: 0.50 sq mi (1.3 km^{2})
  - Water: 0 sq mi (0 km^{2})
- Elevation: 269 ft (82 m)

Population (2000)
  - Total: 3
  - Density: 6.0/sq mi (2.3/km^{2})
- Time zone: UTC-8 (PST)
  - Summer (DST): UTC-7 (PDT)
- ZIP code: 92225
- Area codes: 442/760
- FIPS code: 06-20536
- GNIS feature ID: 1660580

East Blythe is a former census-designated place (CDP) and unincorporated community in Riverside County, California, United States. The 2000 census population was 3.

== Geography ==
According to the United States Census Bureau, the CDP had a total area of 0.5 square miles (1.3 km^{2}), all of it land.

== Demographics ==
Historical population
Census	Pop.	Note	%±
1980	1,660		—
1990	1,511		−9.0%
2000	3		−99.8%

As of the census of 2000, there were three people, two households, and one family residing in the CDP. The population density was 5.8 inhabitants per square mile (2.2/km^{2}). There were two housing units at an average density of 3.9 per square mile (1.5/km^{2}). The racial makeup of the CDP was 100.00% White.

The two households consisted of a married couple living together (one forty-six and one twenty-five to forty-four) and a woman living alone who was sixty-five years of age or older. The average household size was 1.5 and the average family size was two.

== Politics ==
In the state legislature East Blythe is located in the 40th Senate District, represented by Democrat Denise Moreno Ducheny, and in the 80th Assembly District, represented by Republican Bonnie Garcia.

In the United States House of Representatives, East Blythe is in California's 36th congressional district, represented by Democrat Ted Lieu.

== See also ==
- Blythe Intaglios
- Chuckawalla Valley State Prison
- Chuckwalla
- Chuckwalla Mountains
- Chocolate Mountains
- Desert Center
- Coachella Valley
- Big Maria Mountains
- McCoy Mountains
- Cadiz, California
- Mule Mountains (California)
- Palo Verde, California
