= Edgemont School District (South Dakota) =

School district in South Dakota, United States

Address
- 715 D St Edgemont, South Dakota, 57735; United States

District information
- Grades: K - 12
- Superintendent: Amy Ferley
- NCES District ID: 4620850

Students and staff
- Enrollment: 139
- Student–teacher ratio: 10.07
- District mascot: Edgemont Moguls

Other information
- Telephone: (605) 662-7254
- Website: www.edgemont.k12.sd.us

The Edgemont School District is a public school district in Fall River County, based in Edgemont, South Dakota.

== Schools ==
The Edgemont School District has one elementary school and one high school.

=== Elementary school ===
- Edgemont Elementary School

=== Middle school ===
- Edgemont Middle School

=== High school ===
- Edgemont High School
