= Edgemont, Riverside County, California =

Unincorporated community in California, United States

Edgemont, California
- Unincorporated community
- Location of Edgemont in California Edgemont, California (the United States)
- Coordinates: 33°55′00″N 117°16′43″W
- Country: United States
- State: California
- County: Riverside
- Elevation: 1,554 ft (474 m)
- Time zone: UTC-8 (PST)
  - Summer (DST): UTC-7 (PDT)

Edgemont was an unincorporated community in Riverside County, California, and is now part of the City of Moreno Valley.

== Geography ==
Edgemont is located in Moreno Valley, California in Riverside County, California. The coordinates are 33.510N, −117.14W, the elevation is 1,564 feet, and it is in the Pacific Time Zone (UTC-8, UTC-7 in the summer).

Edgemont lies in the coast region of California, and is about 57 miles (92 km) from Los Angeles.

It was originally named Rose Arbor, and it was subdivided for poultry ranches in 1923.
