= Edgemont, Lassen County, California =

Edgemont
- Former settlement
- Location in California
- Coordinates: 40°18′42″N 120°26′42″W
- Country: United States
- State: California
- County: Lassen
- Elevation: 4,032 ft (1,229 m)

Edgemont (also, Spoonville) is a former settlement in Lassen County, California, United States. It was located 5.5 miles (8.9 km) south-southwest of Litchfield, at an elevation of 4032 feet (1229 m).

The Spoonville post office opened in 1903, changed its name to Edgement in 1913, and closed in 1918. The name Spoonville honored Florella A. Spoon.
