= Edgemont Union Free School District =

School district in the U.S. state of New York

Edgemont School District

Location
- Westchester County New York; United States

District information
- Superintendent: Kenneth Hamilton

Other information
- Website: www.edgemont.org

The Edgemont School District or Edgemont Union Free School District is a school district in Westchester County, New York. Its superintendent is Kenneth Hamilton.

== Schools ==
=== Seely Place Elementary School ===
Seely Place Elementary School

Location
- 51 Seely Pl; Scarsdale, NY; United States

Information
- Type: Public
- Principal: Eve Feuerstein
- Grades: K–6
- Campus: Suburban
- Colors: Royal Blue and Black
- Mascot: Panther
- Website: http://sp.edgemont.org

Seely Place Elementary School is an elementary school in Edgemont Union Free School District located in The Town of Greenburgh (Scarsdale Zip Code), Westchester County, New York, serving students in grades K-6.

=== Greenville School ===
Greenville School

Location
- 100 Glendale Road; Scarsdale, NY; United States

Information
- Type: Public
- Principal: Marisa Ferrara
- Grades: K–6
- Campus: Suburban
- Colors: Royal Blue and Black
- Mascot: Panther
- Website: http://gv.edgemont.org

Greenville Elementary School is an elementary school located in The Town of Greenburgh (Scarsdale Zip Code), Westchester County, New York, serving students in grades K-6.

=== Edgemont Jr/Sr High School ===
Edgemont Junior - Senior High School

Location
- 200 White Oak Ln; Scarsdale, NY; United States

Information
- Type: Public secondary
- Established: 1955
- Principal: Kyle Hosier
- Grades: 7 – 12
- Enrollment: 922
- Campus: Suburban
- Colors: Royal Blue and Black
- Mascot: Panther
- Website: http://ehs.edgemont.org

Edgemont Junior - Senior High School is a high school in The Town of Greenburgh (Scarsdale Zip Code), Westchester County, New York, serving students in grades 7 -12. Its feeder schools are Greenville School and Seely Place School, where students graduate in the sixth grade.

== Ranking in the Mass Media ==
The Edgemont School District has consistently received high rankings in both New York State and Nationally. Edgemont School District was selected by Niche Magazine as the #1 Public School District in America in 2015.
